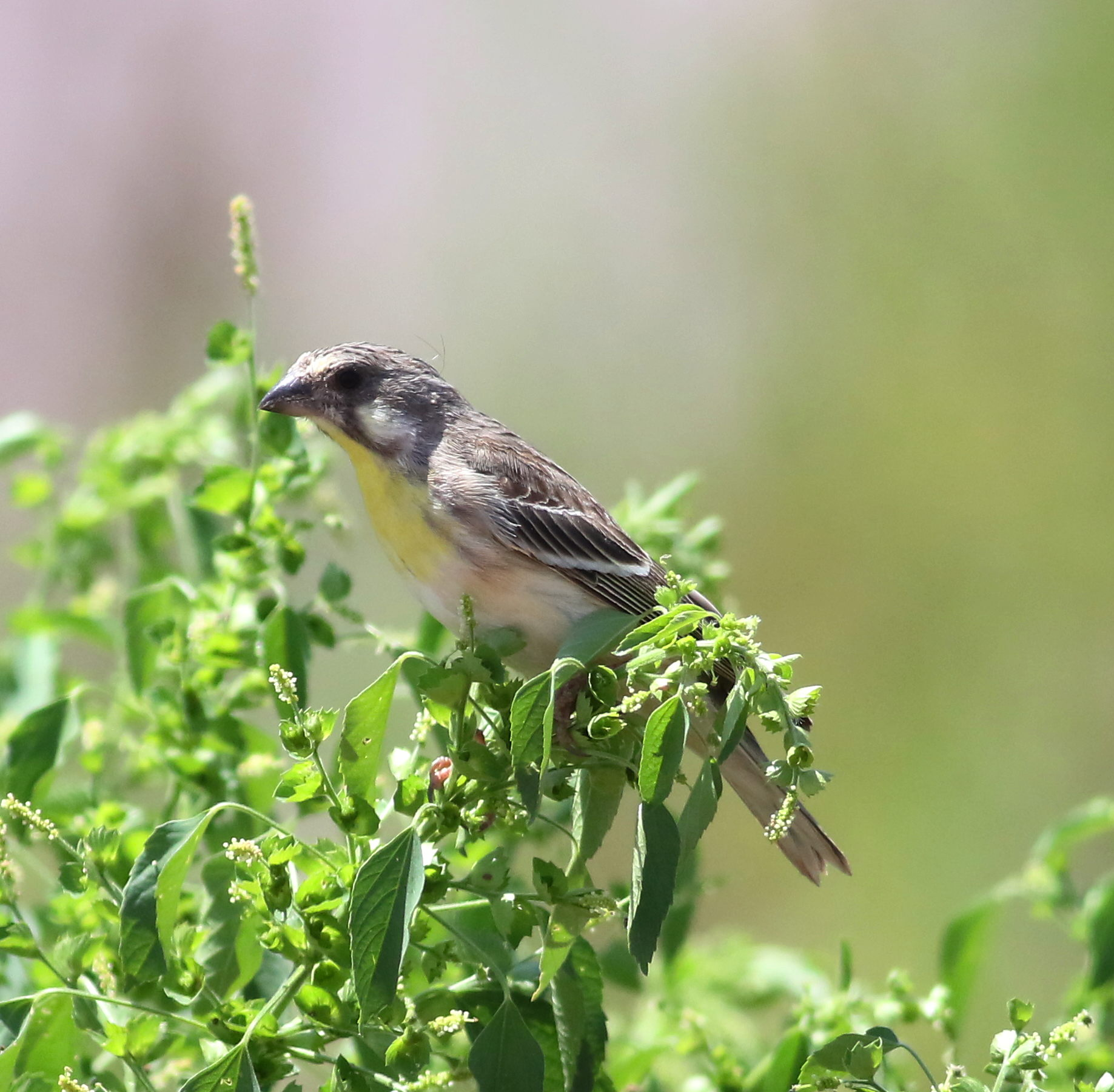

Conservation status
- Least Concern (IUCN 3.1)

Scientific classification
- Kingdom: Animalia
- Phylum: Chordata
- Class: Aves
- Order: Passeriformes
- Family: Fringillidae
- Subfamily: Carduelinae
- Genus: Crithagra
- Species: C. citrinipectus

Binomial name
- Crithagra citrinipectus (Clancey & Lawson, 1960)

Synonyms
- Serinus citrinipectus

= Lemon-breasted canary =

Species of bird

The lemon-breasted canary (Crithagra citrinipectus), also known as the lemon-breasted seedeater, is a species of finch in the family Fringillidae. It is found in Malawi, Mozambique, South Africa, Zambia, and Zimbabwe. Its natural habitats are dry savannah, subtropical or tropical dry shrubland, and rural gardens.

== Taxonomy and systematics ==
The lemon-breasted canary was identified as species in 1960 by Clancey and Lawson from a type obtained near Panda, in Inhambane Province of southern Mozambique. Research involving mitochondrial DNA analysis suggests that this species along with S. leucopygia, S. mozambicus, and S. dorsostriatus belong in a separate genus, Ochrospiza, as they have been revealed to be only distantly related to other African members of the present genus, Serinus. However, before a revision can be made, a detailed inspection of all the taxa in the current genus is necessary. Some consider this species to be a hybrid between S. atrogularis and S. mozambicus.

The lemon-breasted canary was formerly placed in the genus Serinus but phylogenetic analysis using mitochondrial and nuclear DNA sequences found that the genus was polyphyletic. The genus was therefore split and a number of species including the lemon-breasted canary were moved to the resurrected genus Crithagra.

== Description ==
Although their common name would indicate that each lemon-breasted canary indeed has a yellow throat/chest, this is not the case between males and females, making them easy to differentiate. Only the males have the signature yellow feathers in the breast region. The females have mostly cream and brown feathers, less distinct head markings. However, both sexes have noticeably yellow rumps around the tail feathers and bicolored beaks, the upper part being darker brown/black than the lower part. In addition, males also have white and yellow cheek patches and two yellow and white dots above their beaks. Nestlings of this species show yellow beak edges. There are no known subspecies, however there are small differences between canaries of different regions.

== Range and distribution ==
This species of finch is found locally in Malawi, Zimbabwe, Mozambique, Zululand, South Africa, and Zambia. Despite their restricted geographical range and declining overall population, it is still considered a species of "least concern" on the current IUCN Red List category. The total population size is unknown, but is well above the "vulnerable" range of <10,000 mature individuals. This species of bird resides and breeds over an area of 49,800 km^{2}.

== Habitat and ecology ==
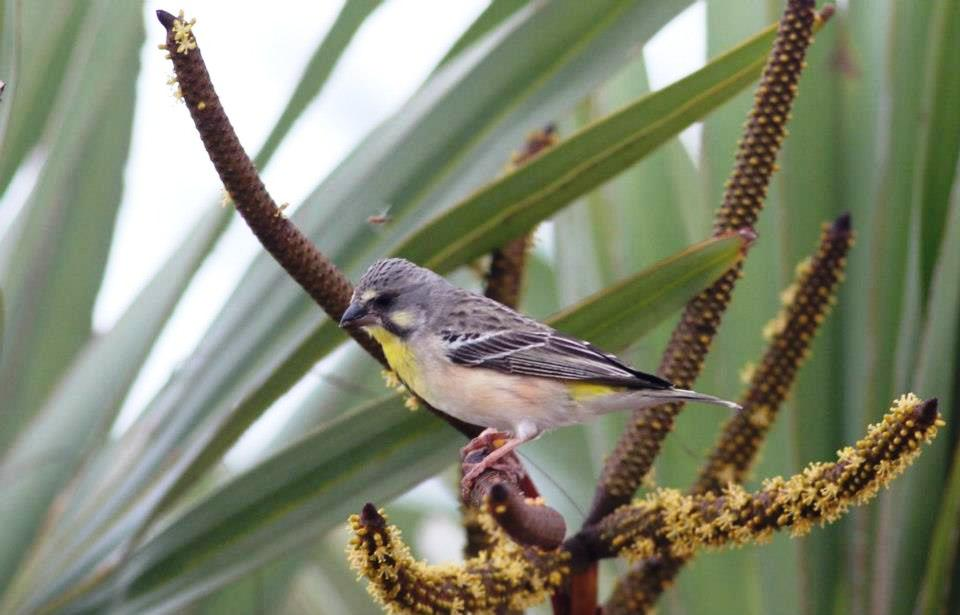
Male perched on a palm inflorescence in southern Mozambique

The lemon-breasted canary resides in southeastern Africa, far south of the equator, and sometimes in the same areas in which Serinus mozambicus — commonly known as the greensinger — is also found. They live in mostly dry areas such as grasslands with sporadic low vegetation and at the boundaries of woody areas. They build their nests mostly (and preferably) in specific species of palms, using the brown fibers of the palms to help construct the outside of the nests, though the inside is lined with softer materials.

== Behavior and social organization ==
During breeding season, males are busy singers. Their song is brief, rapid, and relatively tuneless and occurs in a series of short rising and falling twittering. Their breeding season occurs between December and May, but main activity is in January and February. These birds are monogamous and are fairly solitary and territorial. The courtship process in general is less complex than in most other finches, mostly involving singing and the raised posture of the males with slightly extended wings to attract females. Maturity of the males is measured during this time by their singing and courting. In captivity chicks are fed by females with egg food, germinated seeds, and some animal food during their first week of life. Overall the lemon-breasted canary is sedentary and partially nomadic, and during non-breeding season the flocks move about at random within their home range.

== Population trend and threats ==
The population of lemon-breasted canaries are in an overall, albeit fairly mild decline. This is mostly due to overall pressures on the palms in which they reside (which are used for furniture manufacturing) as well as capture for the cage bird trade. That said, in some locations such as the deforested Shire Valley of Malawi, the populations of lemon-breasted canaries are seemingly increasing. In the particular example of the Shire Valley, this is likely due to its adaptability to a wide variety of grassland habitats. One study has estimated that at least 2,000 individuals are exported from the population of southern Mozambique each year, leading to a decline of populations in that area.
