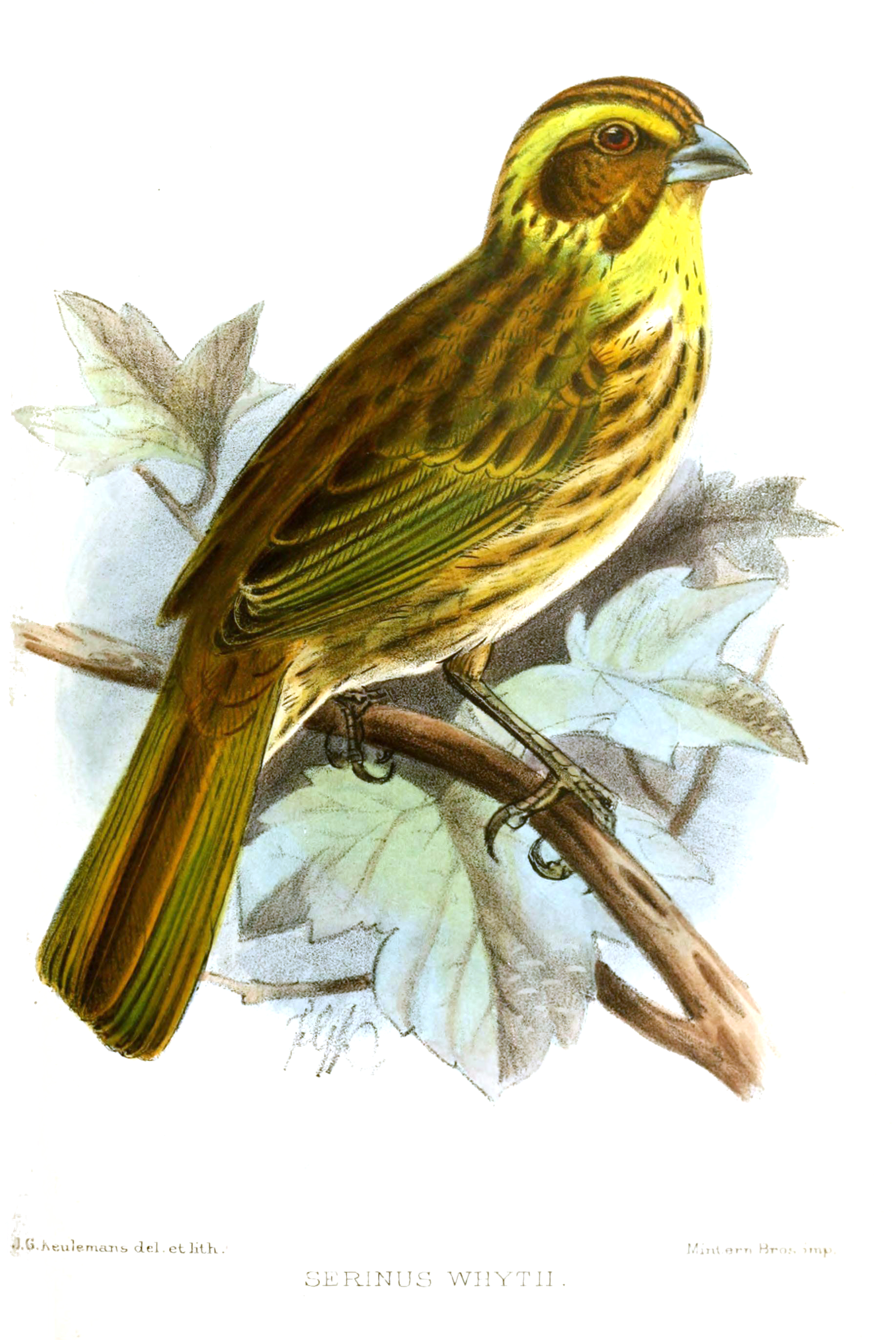

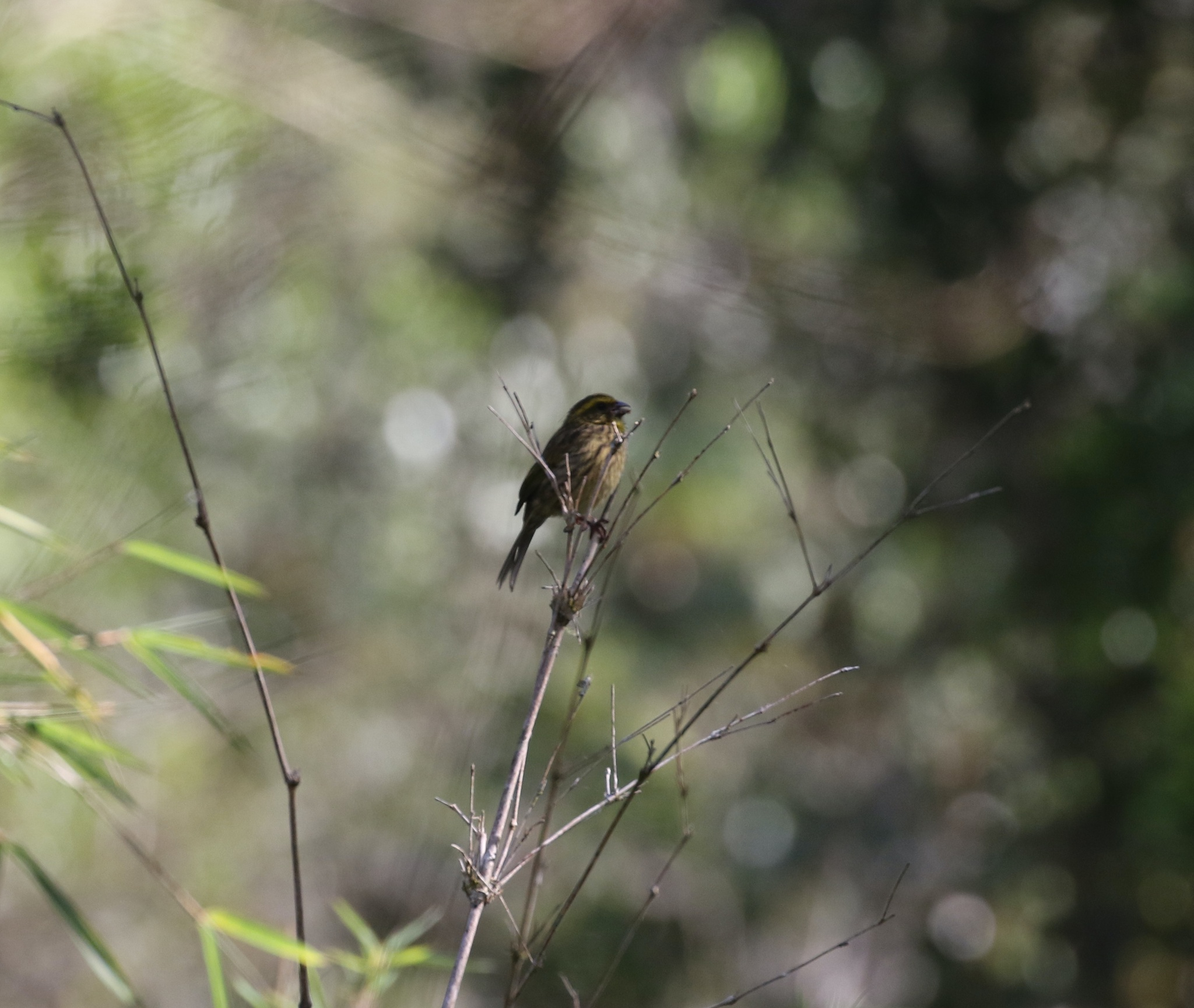

Conservation status
- Least Concern (IUCN 3.1)

Scientific classification
- Kingdom: Animalia
- Phylum: Chordata
- Class: Aves
- Order: Passeriformes
- Family: Fringillidae
- Subfamily: Carduelinae
- Genus: Crithagra
- Species: C. whytii

Binomial name
- Crithagra whytii (Shelley, 1897)

Synonyms
- Serinus whytii

= Yellow-browed seedeater =

Species of bird

The yellow-browed seedeater (Crithagra whytii) is a species of finch in the family Fringillidae. It is found in Malawi, Tanzania, and Zambia.

The yellow-browed seedeater was formerly placed in the genus Serinus but phylogenetic analysis using mitochondrial and nuclear DNA sequences found that the genus was polyphyletic. The genus was therefore split and a number of species including the yellow-browed seedeater were moved to the resurrected genus Crithagra.

Since 2012 the IUCN has treated this taxon as a subspecies of Crithagra striolata.
