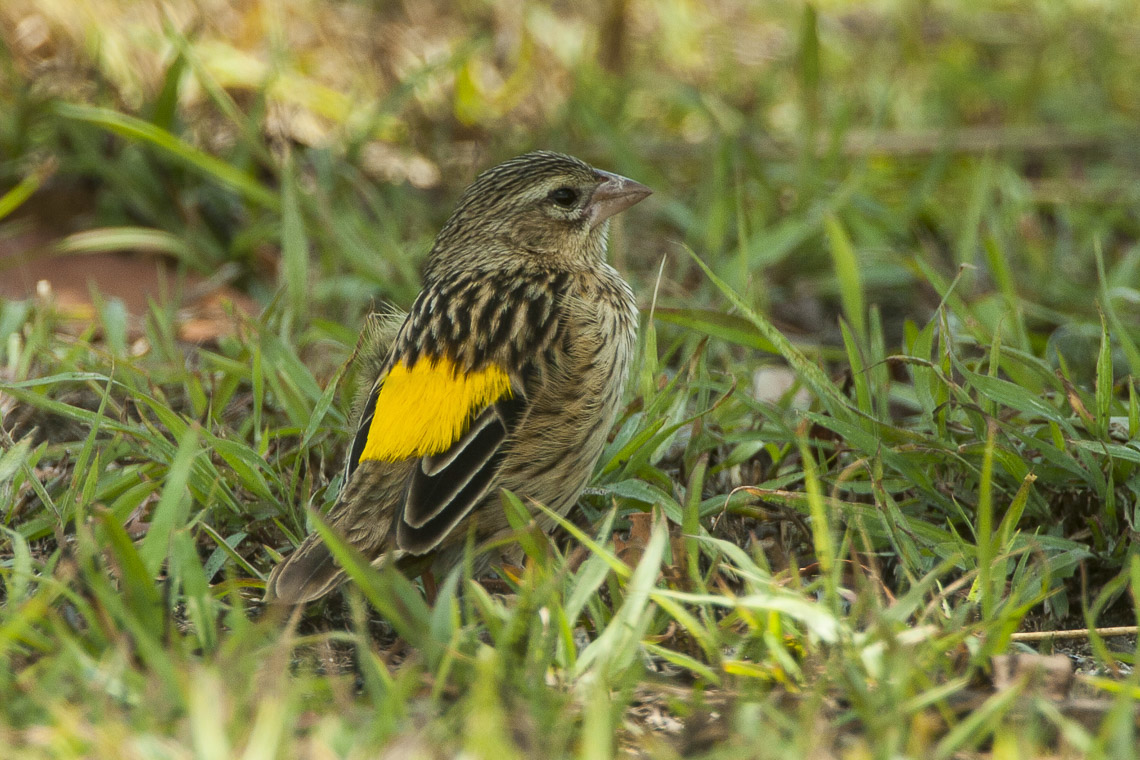

Conservation status
- Least Concern (IUCN 3.1)

Scientific classification
- Kingdom: Animalia
- Phylum: Chordata
- Class: Aves
- Order: Passeriformes
- Family: Fringillidae
- Subfamily: Carduelinae
- Genus: Crithagra
- Species: C. reichenowi

Binomial name
- Crithagra reichenowi (Salvadori, 1888)

Synonyms
- Serinus reichenowi

= Reichenow's seedeater =

Species of bird

Reichenow's seedeater (Crithagra reichenowi) is a species of finch in the family Fringillidae. It is sometimes considered conspecific with the black-throated canary.

The Reichenow's seedeater was formerly placed in the genus Serinus but phylogenetic analysis using mitochondrial and nuclear DNA sequences found that the genus was polyphyletic. The genus was therefore split and a number of species including the Reichenow's seedeater were moved to the resurrected genus Crithagra.

== Distribution ==
It is found frequently in eastern Africa. Its natural habitats are subtropical or tropical dry forest, dry savanna, and subtropical or tropical dry shrubland.
