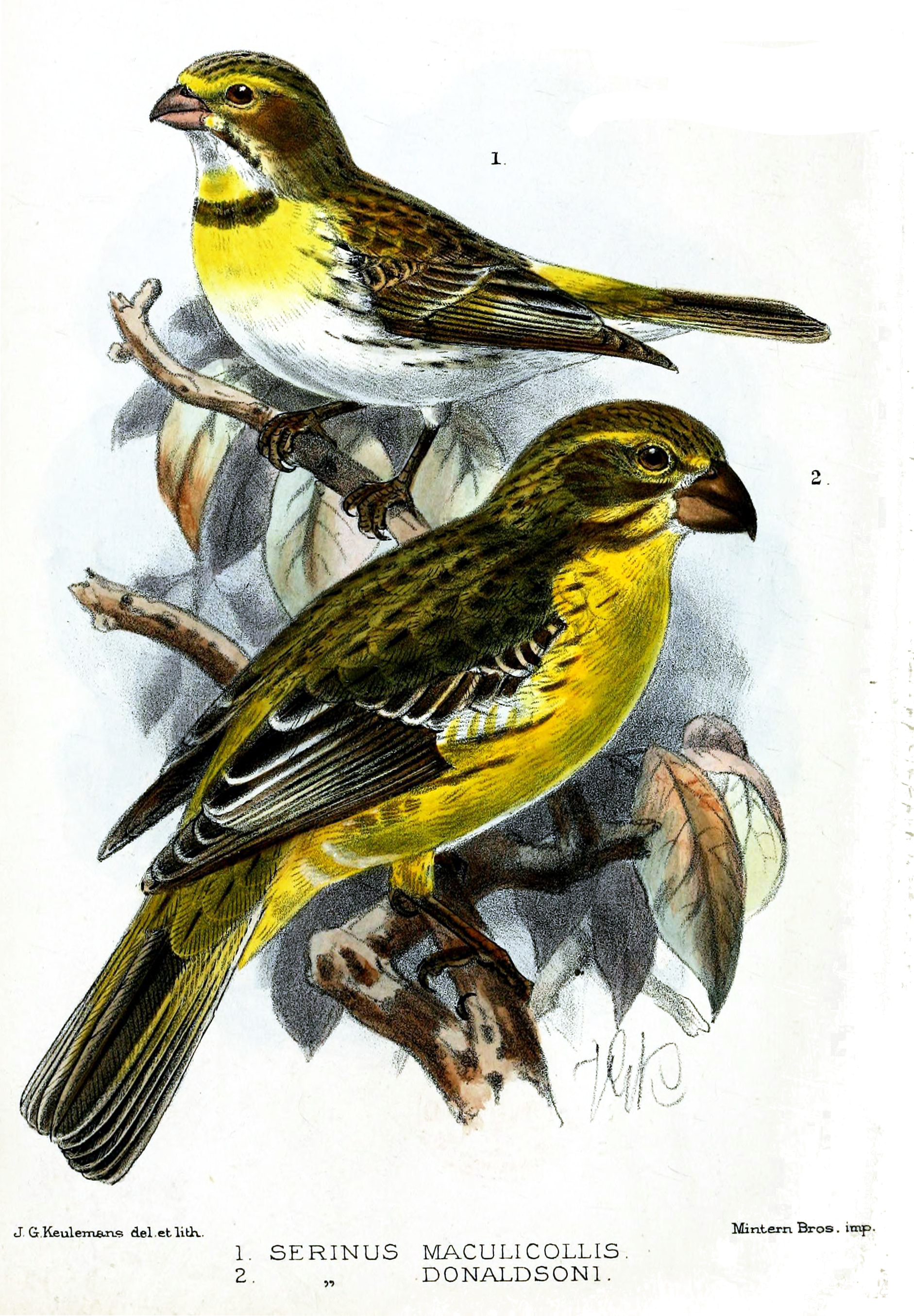
- Illustration (lower) with a white-bellied canary (above)
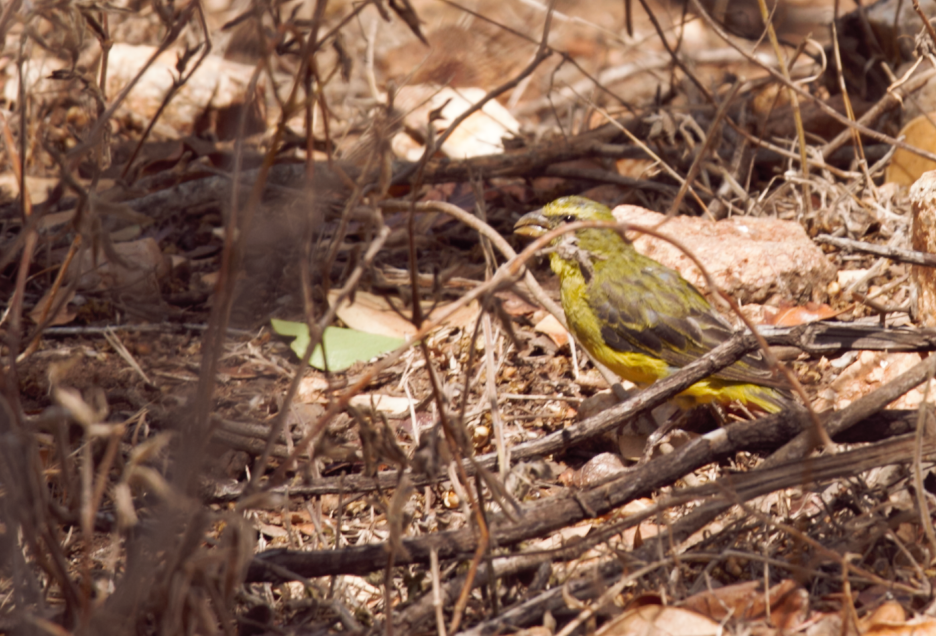

Conservation status
- Least Concern (IUCN 3.1)

Scientific classification
- Kingdom: Animalia
- Phylum: Chordata
- Class: Aves
- Order: Passeriformes
- Family: Fringillidae
- Subfamily: Carduelinae
- Genus: Crithagra
- Species: C. donaldsoni

Binomial name
- Crithagra donaldsoni (Sharpe, 1895)

Synonyms
- Serinus donaldsoni

= Northern grosbeak-canary =

Species of bird

The northern grosbeak-canary or Abyssinian grosbeak-canary (Crithagra donaldsoni) is a species of passerine bird in the finch family Fringillidae. It is found in Ethiopia, Kenya, and Somalia. Its binomial name commemorates the explorer Arthur Donaldson Smith.

The northern grosbeak-canary was formerly placed in the genus Serinus but phylogenetic analysis using mitochondrial and nuclear DNA sequences found that the genus was polyphyletic. The genus was therefore split and a number of species including the northern grosbeak-canary were moved to the resurrected genus Crithagra.
