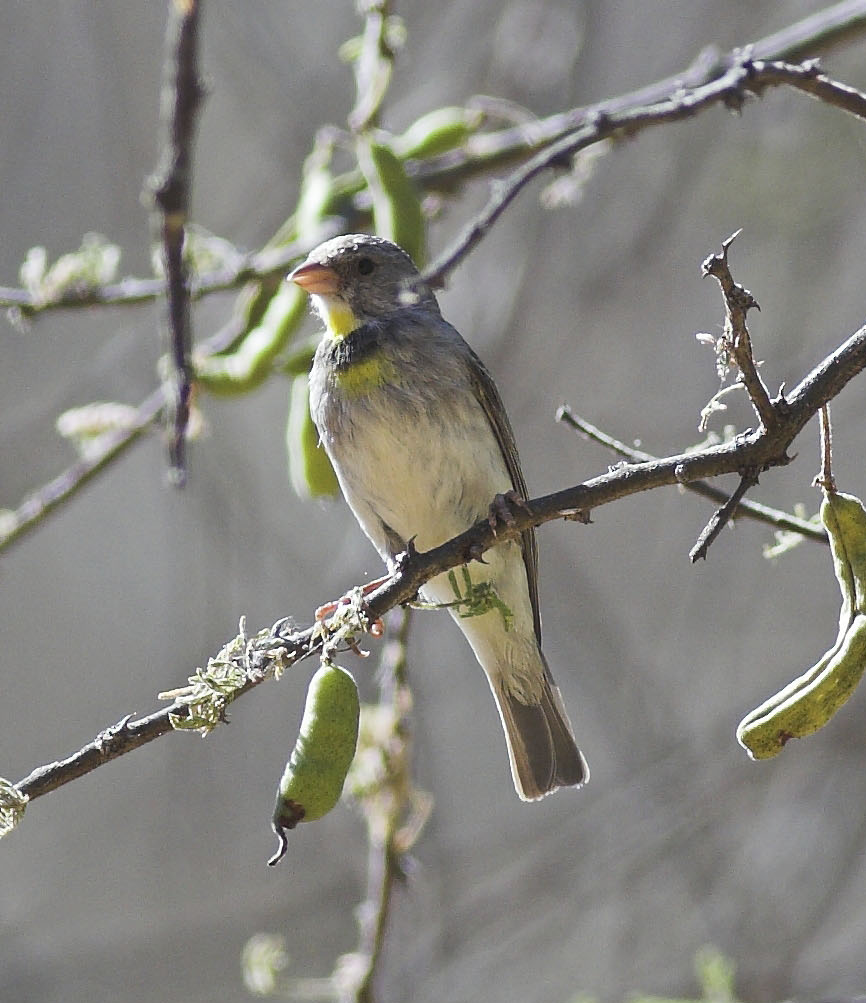

Conservation status
- Near Threatened (IUCN 3.1)

Scientific classification
- Kingdom: Animalia
- Phylum: Chordata
- Class: Aves
- Order: Passeriformes
- Family: Fringillidae
- Subfamily: Carduelinae
- Genus: Crithagra
- Species: C. xantholaema

Binomial name
- Crithagra xantholaema (Salvadori, 1896)

Synonyms
- Serinus xantholaemus

= Salvadori's seedeater =

Species of bird

Salvadori's seedeater or Salvadori's serin (Crithagra xantholaema) is a species of finch in the family Fringillidae. It is found only in Ethiopia. Its natural habitats are subtropical or tropical dry forest and subtropical or tropical high-altitude shrubland. It is threatened by habitat loss.

Salvadori's seedeater was formerly placed in the genus Serinus but phylogenetic analysis using mitochondrial and nuclear DNA sequences found that the genus was polyphyletic. The genus was therefore split and a number of species including Salvadori's seedeater were moved to the resurrected genus Crithagra.
