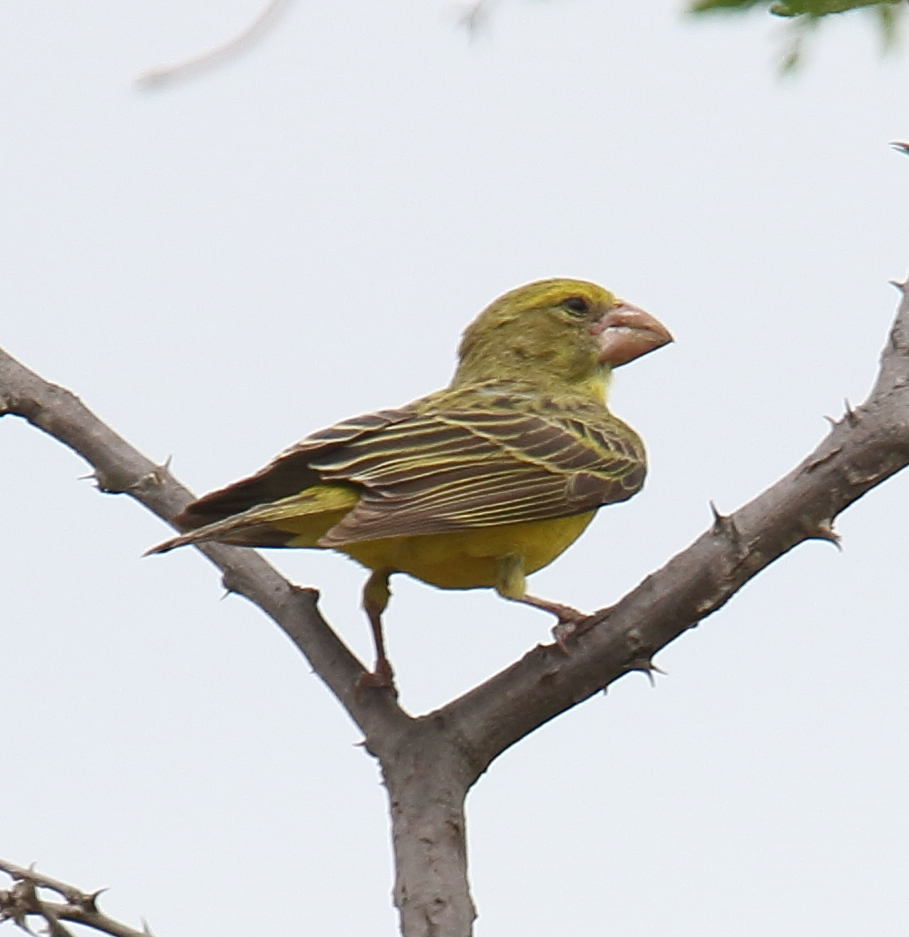

Conservation status
- Least Concern (IUCN 3.1)

Scientific classification
- Kingdom: Animalia
- Phylum: Chordata
- Class: Aves
- Order: Passeriformes
- Family: Fringillidae
- Subfamily: Carduelinae
- Genus: Crithagra
- Species: C. buchanani

Binomial name
- Crithagra buchanani (Hartert, 1919)

Synonyms
- Serinus buchanani

= Southern grosbeak-canary =

Species of bird

The southern grosbeak-canary, also known as Kenya grosbeak-canary (Crithagra buchanani) is a species of finch in the family Fringillidae. It is found in Kenya and Tanzania. Its natural habitat is subtropical or tropical dry shrubland.

The southern grosbeak-canary was formerly placed in the genus Serinus but phylogenetic analysis using mitochondrial and nuclear DNA sequences found that the genus was polyphyletic. The genus was therefore split and a number of species including the southern grosbeak-canary were moved to the resurrected genus Crithagra.
