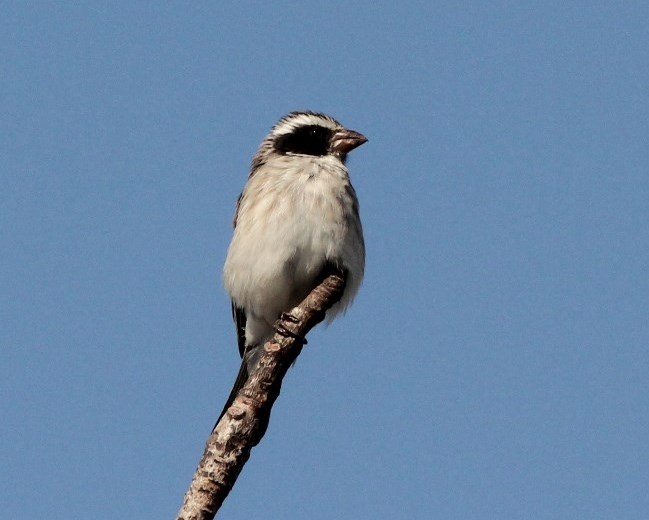
- An adult bird in central Mozambique

Conservation status
- Least Concern (IUCN 3.1)

Scientific classification
- Kingdom: Animalia
- Phylum: Chordata
- Class: Aves
- Order: Passeriformes
- Family: Fringillidae
- Subfamily: Carduelinae
- Genus: Crithagra
- Species: C. mennelli

Binomial name
- Crithagra mennelli (Chubb, 1908)

Synonyms
- Serinus mennelli

= Black-eared seedeater =

Species of bird

The black-eared seedeater or blackeared canary (Crithagra mennelli) is a species of finch in the family Fringillidae. Its native habitat is miombo woodland.

The black-eared seedeater was formerly placed in the genus Serinus but phylogenetic analysis using mitochondrial and nuclear DNA sequences found that the genus was polyphyletic. The genus was therefore split and a number of species including the black-eared seedeater were moved to the resurrected genus Crithagra.
