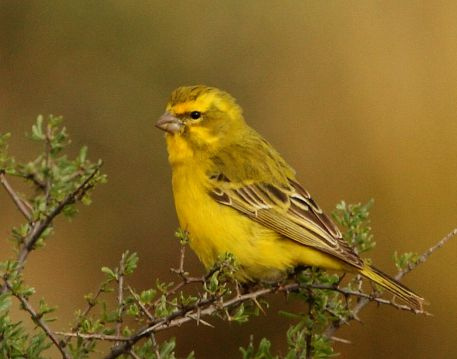
- In Northern Cape, South Africa

Conservation status
- Least Concern (IUCN 3.1)

Scientific classification
- Kingdom: Animalia
- Phylum: Chordata
- Class: Aves
- Order: Passeriformes
- Family: Fringillidae
- Subfamily: Carduelinae
- Genus: Crithagra
- Species: C. flaviventris

Binomial name
- Crithagra flaviventris (Gmelin, JF, 1789)

Synonyms
- Serinus flaviventris

= Yellow canary =

Species of bird

The yellow canary (Crithagra flaviventris) is a small passerine bird in the true finch family. It is a resident breeder in much of the western and central regions of southern Africa and has been introduced to Ascension and St Helena islands.

== Taxonomy ==
The yellow canary was formally described in 1789 by the German naturalist Johann Friedrich Gmelin in his revised and expanded edition of Carl Linnaeus's Systema Naturae. He placed it with the crossbills in the genus Loxia and coined the binomial name Loxia flaviventris. He specified the location as the Cape of Good Hope. The specific epithet flaviventris is from Latin flavus meaning "yellow" and venter (genitive ventris) meaning "belly". Gmelin based his account on the "Le Gros-bec jaune du Cap de Bonne Espérance" that had been described and illustrated in 1760 by the French zoologist Mathurin Jacques Brisson.

The yellow canary was formerly placed in the genus Serinus but a phylogenetic study published in 2012 found that the genus was polyphyletic. In the reorganisation to create monophyletic genera, Serinus was split and a number of species including the yellow canary were moved to the resurrected genus Crithagra that had originally been introduced in 1827 by the English ornithologist William Swainson.

Four subspecies are recognised:

- C. f. damarensis (Roberts, 1922) – southwest Angola, Namibia, Botswana and central north South Africa
- C. f. flaviventris (Gmelin, JF, 1789) – extreme south Namibia and west, southwest South Africa
- C. f. guillarmodi (Roberts, 1936) – highlands of Lesotho
- C. f. marshalli (Shelley, 1902) – southeast Botswana, central, northeast South Africa and lowlands of Lesotho

== Description ==
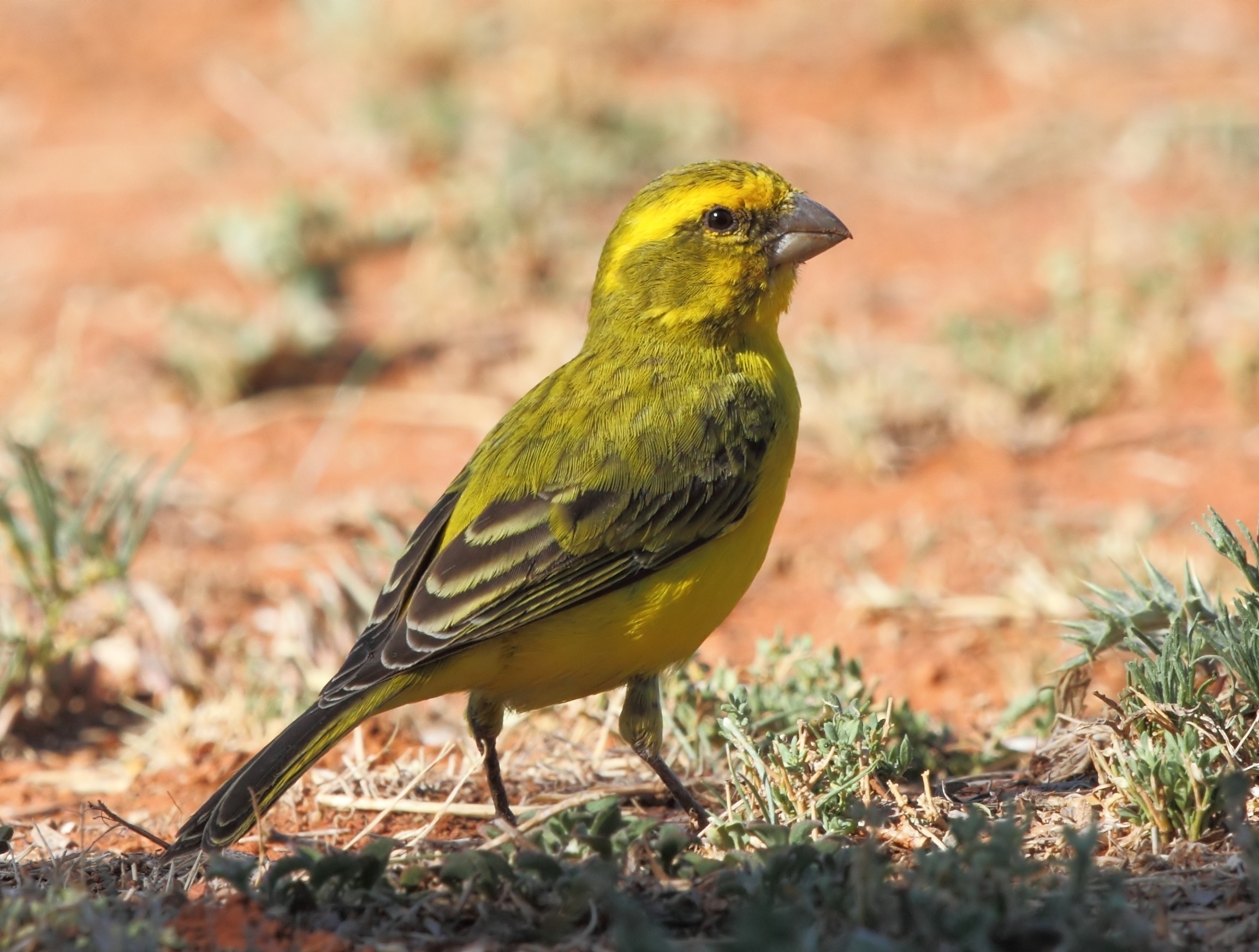
Male in Mokala National Park

The yellow canary is typically 10 cm in length. The adult male colour ranges from almost uniform yellow in the northwest of its range to streaked, olive backed birds in the southeast. The underparts, rump and tail sides are yellow. The female has grey-brown upperparts, black wings with yellow flight feathers, and a pale supercilium. The underparts are white with brown streaking. The juvenile resembles the female, but has heavier streaking.

This species is easily distinguished from the yellow-fronted canary by its lack of black facial markings, and its bill is less heavy than that of other similar African Crithagra species.

The brimstone canary, with overlapping range, is a known confusion species.

== Distribution and habitat ==
Its habitat is karoo and coastal or mountain valley scrub. It builds a compact cup nest in a scrub. The yellow canary is a common and gregarious seedeater. Its call is chissick or cheree, and the song is a warbled zee-zeree-chereeo.
