= Yellow-throated seedeater =

Conservation status
- Near Threatened (IUCN 3.1)

Scientific classification
- Kingdom: Animalia
- Phylum: Chordata
- Class: Aves
- Order: Passeriformes
- Family: Fringillidae
- Subfamily: Carduelinae
- Genus: Crithagra
- Species: C. flavigula

Binomial name
- Crithagra flavigula (Salvadori, 1888)

Synonyms
- Serinus flavigula

Species of bird

The yellow-throated seedeater (Crithagra flavigula) is a species of finch in the family Fringillidae. It is found only in Ethiopia. Its natural habitats are subtropical or tropical dry shrubland and subtropical or tropical dry lowland grassland. It is threatened by habitat loss.

The voice of the bird is a jumbled chirpy song and its call is canary like zeee-zsreee. The bird favors semi-desert areas with thick patches of scrub on rocky hill sides, scattered trees in savannah type areas. It also prefers highlands rather than low lands.

The yellow-throated seedeater was formerly placed in the genus Serinus but phylogenetic analysis using mitochondrial and nuclear DNA sequences found that the genus was polyphyletic. The genus was therefore split and a number of species including the yellow-throated seedeater were moved to the resurrected genus Crithagra.
