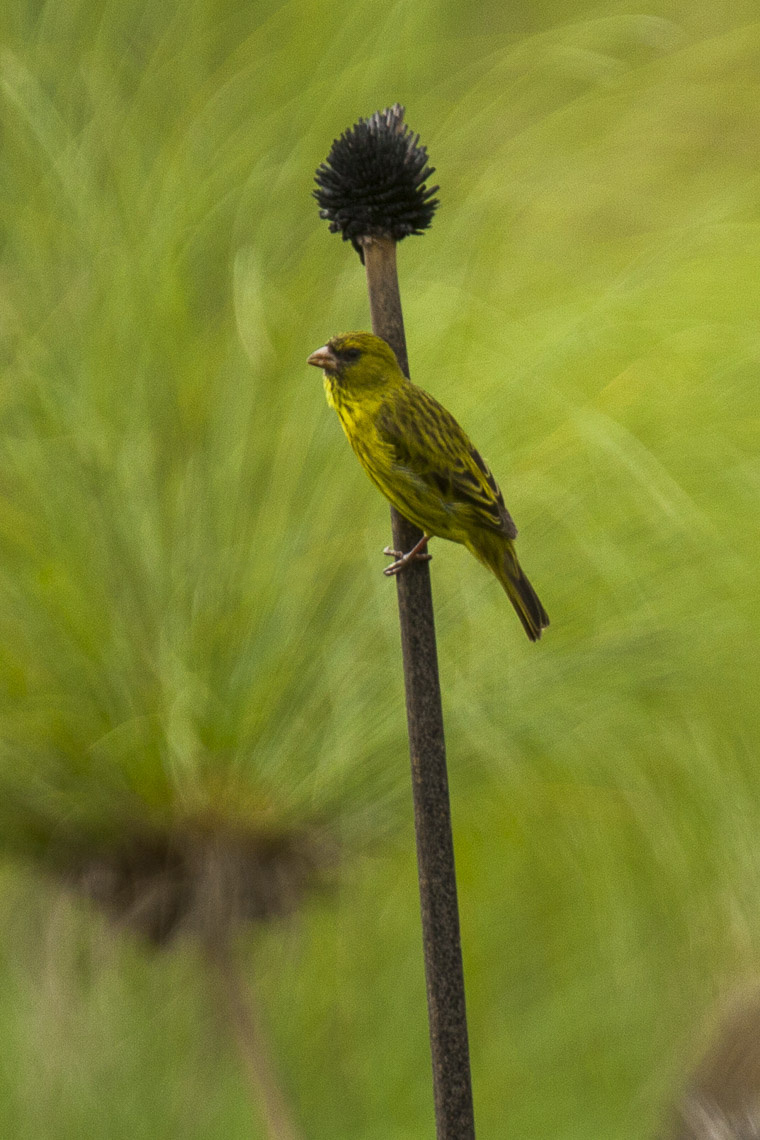

Conservation status
- Least Concern (IUCN 3.1)

Scientific classification
- Kingdom: Animalia
- Phylum: Chordata
- Class: Aves
- Order: Passeriformes
- Family: Fringillidae
- Subfamily: Carduelinae
- Genus: Crithagra
- Species: C. koliensis

Binomial name
- Crithagra koliensis (Grant & Mackworth-Praed, 1952)

Synonyms
- Serinus koliensis

= Papyrus canary =

Species of bird

The papyrus canary (Crithagra koliensis), also known as Van Someren's canary, is a species of passerine bird in the finch family Fringillidae.

It is found in Burundi, the Democratic Republic of the Congo, Kenya, Rwanda, Tanzania, and Uganda. It is found primarily in papyrus stands at altitudes of between 900 and 1,600 m (2,950 and 5,250 ft), but is also found in cultivation near highland papyrus. It always builds its nests in papyrus stands, using papyrus leaves as the main material.

The papyrus canary was formerly placed in the genus Serinus but phylogenetic analysis using mitochondrial and nuclear DNA sequences found that the genus was polyphyletic. The genus was therefore split and a number of species including the papyrus canary were moved to the resurrected genus Crithagra.
