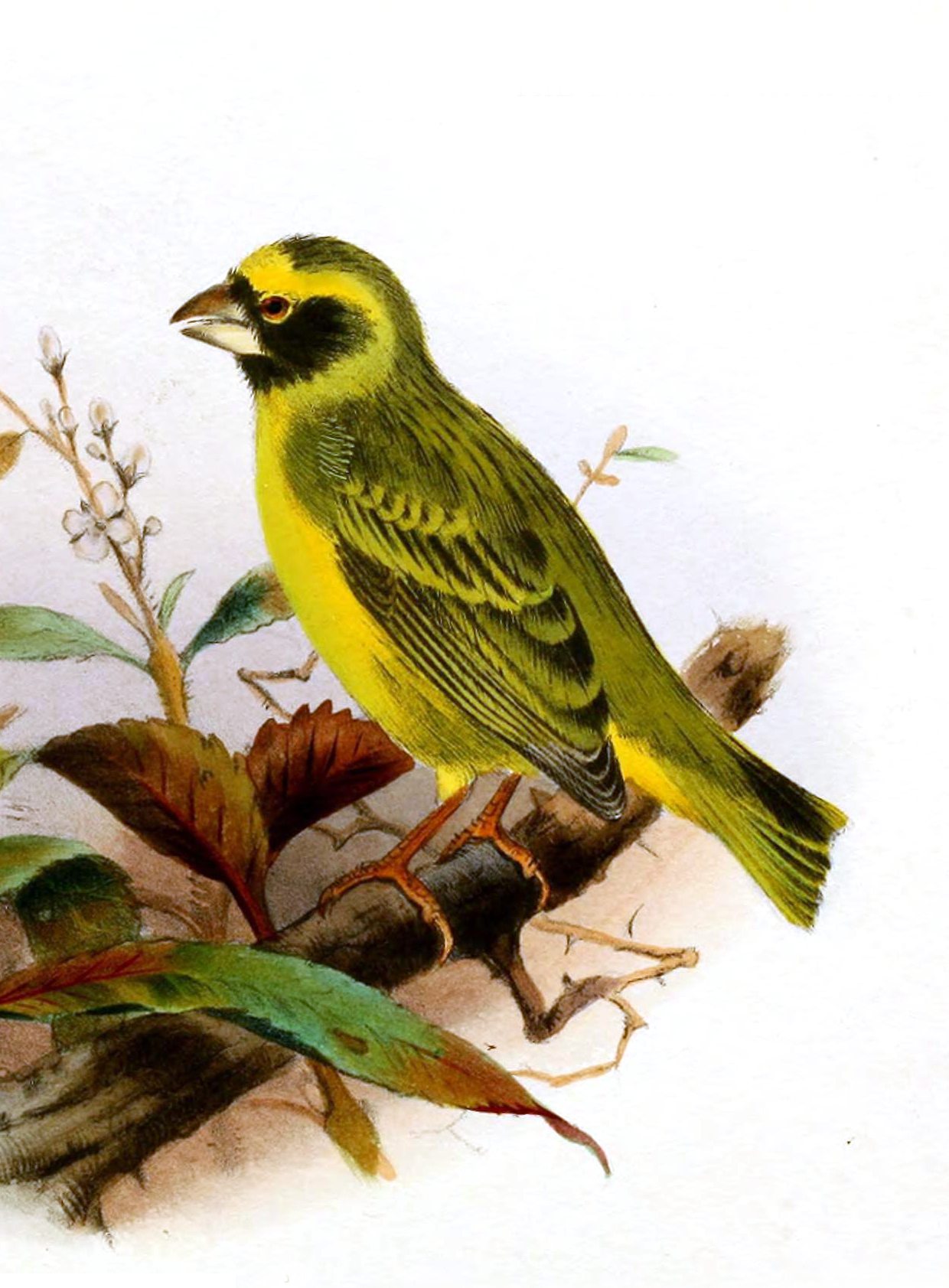
- Black-faced canary by Henrik Grönvold
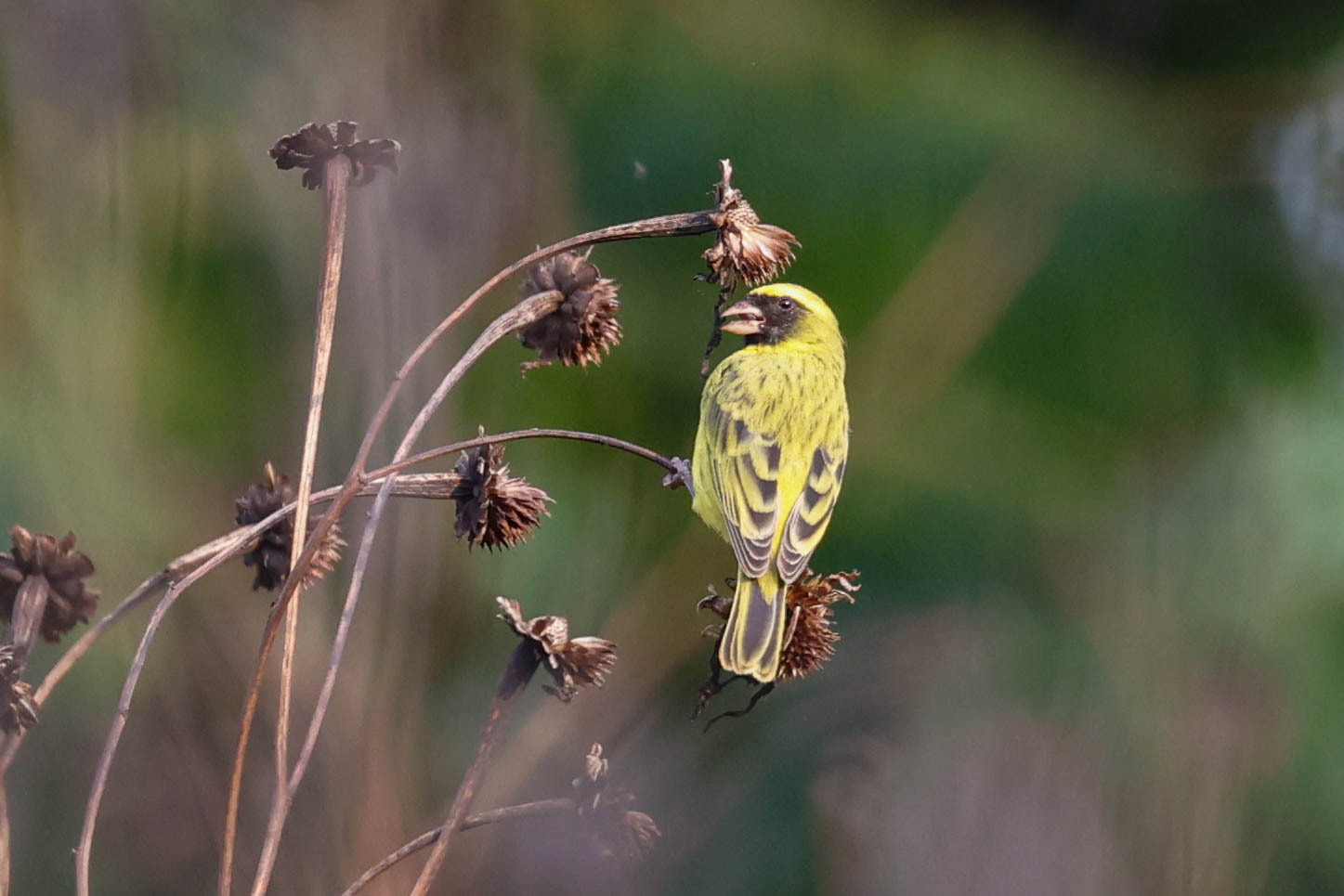

Conservation status
- Least Concern (IUCN 3.1)

Scientific classification
- Kingdom: Animalia
- Phylum: Chordata
- Class: Aves
- Order: Passeriformes
- Family: Fringillidae
- Subfamily: Carduelinae
- Genus: Crithagra
- Species: C. capistrata

Binomial name
- Crithagra capistrata Finsch, 1870

Synonyms
- Serinus capistratus

= Black-faced canary =

Species of bird

The black-faced canary (Crithagra capistrata) is a species of finch in the family Fringillidae. It is found in Angola, Burundi, the Republic of the Congo, the Democratic Republic of the Congo, Gabon, and Zambia. Its natural habitats are subtropical or tropical moist lowland forest and subtropical or tropical moist shrubland.

The black-faced canary was formerly placed in the genus Serinus but phylogenetic analysis using mitochondrial and nuclear DNA sequences found that the genus was polyphyletic. The genus was therefore split and a number of species including the black-faced canary were moved to the resurrected genus Crithagra.
