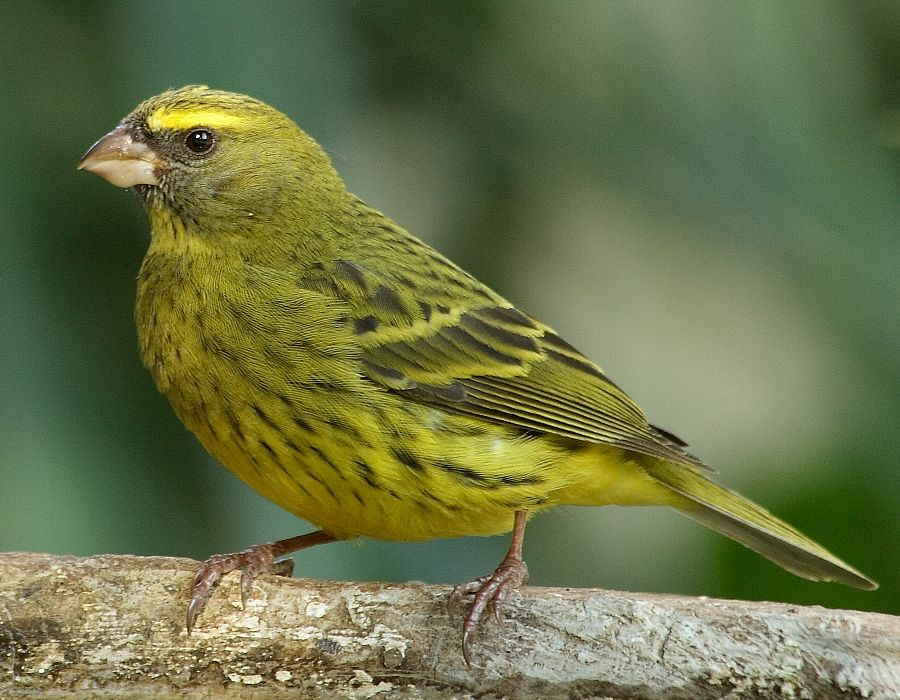

Conservation status
- Least Concern (IUCN 3.1)

Scientific classification
- Kingdom: Animalia
- Phylum: Chordata
- Class: Aves
- Order: Passeriformes
- Family: Fringillidae
- Subfamily: Carduelinae
- Genus: Crithagra
- Species: C. scotops

Binomial name
- Crithagra scotops Sundevall, 1850

Synonyms
- Serinus scotops

= Forest canary =

Species of bird

The forest canary (Crithagra scotops) is a species of finch in the family Fringillidae. It is found in South Africa and Eswatini. Its natural habitats are subtropical or tropical moist lowland forest and subtropical or tropical moist montane forest.

The forest canary was formerly placed in the genus Serinus but phylogenetic analysis using mitochondrial and nuclear DNA sequences found that the genus was polyphyletic. The genus was therefore split and a number of species including the forest canary were moved to the resurrected genus Crithagra.

== Diet and foraging ==
The forest canary's main diet consists of seeds, fruits, and figs. Seeds like Panicum (Guinea grasses), Alyssum, and Passerina corymbosa (gonna) are commonly found in their diet. Forest canaries enjoy Penaea cneorum and Penaeaceae flowers. These birds enjoy Senecio (creeping groundsel) and Ptaeroxylon obliquum (Sneezewood) leaves. In addition to these, the forest canary will also eat insects. However, insects are usually consumed during the breeding season as a source of more protein. When searching for food, they will forage in small groups or pairs. They tend to forage in low areas, such as the ground or near bushes and flowers. When eating, they will usually take cover to stay hidden.

== Breeding ==
Breeding season for the forest canary is usually from October to March, though it can vary by location or climate. The forest canary prefers a warmer climate; their primary location is in the southernmost portion of Africa. During this time, they may have up to two broods. They are known to be monogamous, having a long-term pairing with one mate. The male and female split responsibilities to make the nest. The female builds the nest while the male collects materials, such as twigs and plant fibers. The female will then hatch a brood of 2-5 eggs. In about 14 days, the eggs then hatch. Both parents proceed to feed the chicks until they fledge within the next 14–19 days.

== Appearance ==
The forest canary is a small bird with a short, thick beak, measuring 11–13 cm in length and weighing 10-14 g. The male and female are identifiable by their differences in color. The feathers on the back and wings of the male are yellow with a slight green tint, while the female has a greenish-gray color with yellow on its underparts. Both the male and female have a black mask that trails from the forehead to the eyes, as well as being marked with multiple black streaks on their upper parts. The juvenile forest canary is similar in appearance to the female, with a dull olive hue.

== Location ==
The forest canary resides in Sub-Saharan Africa, in countries such as Cameroon, Congo, and Kenya. It prefers a dry, warm climate. These birds can be found in edges and clearings in the dense bush of highland or submontane evergreen forests. This climate includes the Eastern Cape, dry Euphorbia-dominated woodlands on south-facing valley slopes, and remnant forest patches in highveld grasslands, edges of cultivation, principally maize (Zea mays), tree plantations, scrub, orchards, and gardens (Birds of World). From sea level to 1800 m. These birds can also span along the Limpopo Province south to KwaZulu-Natal and down the southern coast to the Eastern and Western Cape.

== Threats ==
These birds are known to be the prey of peregrine falcons, and are not known to be preyed upon by any other animals. They face habitat loss through deforestation and wildfires. They are not an endangered species.
