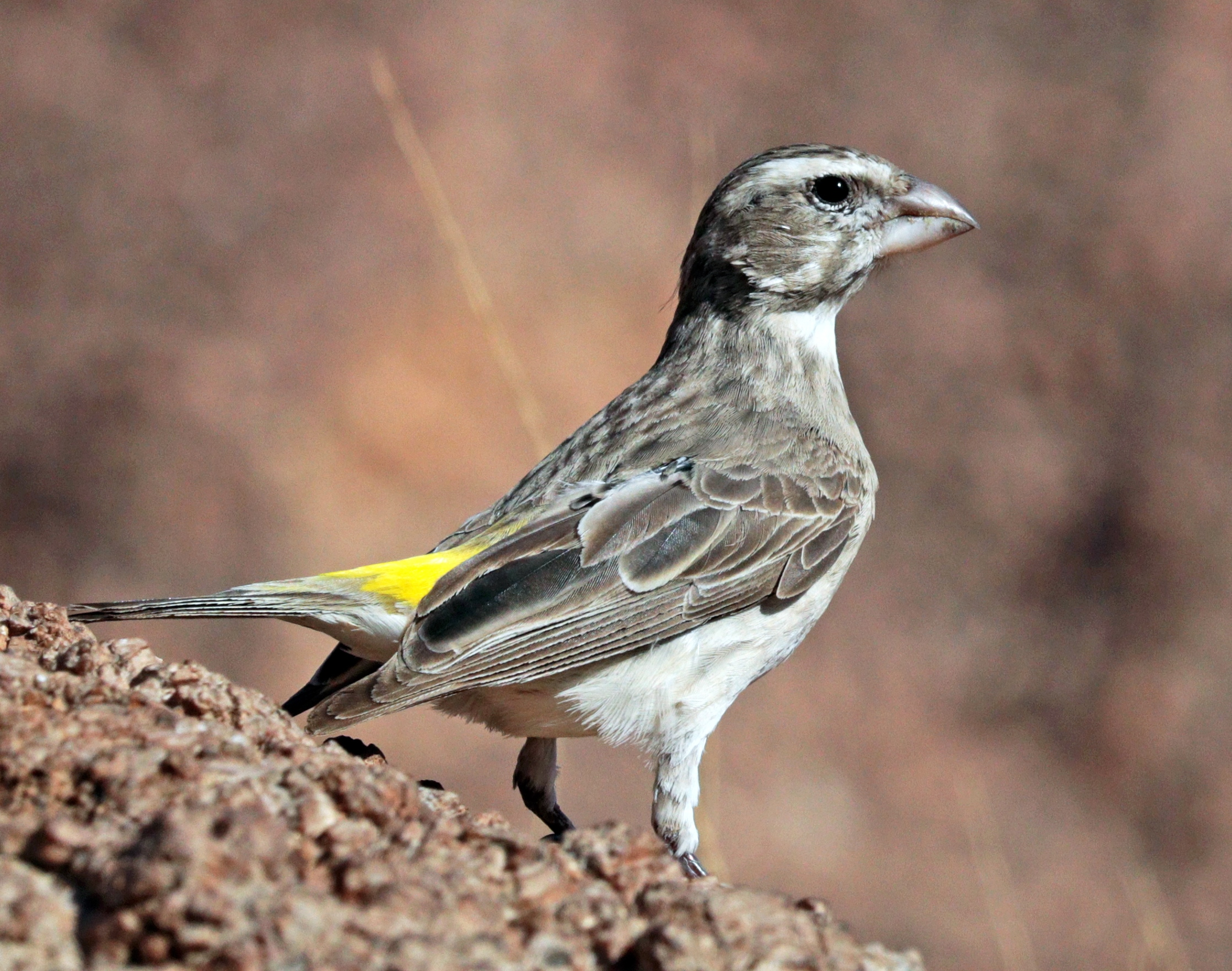
- C. a. crocopygia Damaraland, Namibia

Conservation status
- Least Concern (IUCN 3.1)

Scientific classification
- Kingdom: Animalia
- Phylum: Chordata
- Class: Aves
- Order: Passeriformes
- Family: Fringillidae
- Subfamily: Carduelinae
- Genus: Crithagra
- Species: C. albogularis

Binomial name
- Crithagra albogularis Smith, 1833

Synonyms
- Serinus albogularis

= White-throated canary =

Species of bird

The white-throated canary (Crithagra albogularis) is a species of finch in the family Fringillidae.

== Taxonomy ==
The white-throated canary was formerly placed in the genus Serinus but phylogenetic analysis using mitochondrial and nuclear DNA sequences found that the genus was polyphyletic. The genus was therefore split and a number of species including the white-throated canary were moved to the resurrected genus Crithagra.

== Description ==
The white-throated canary is a small bird about 15 cm long with generally dull-coloured plumage and a yellow or yellow-green rump. It has a heavy horn-coloured beak and brown irises. Its legs are brown. The male and female have similar external appearances, and juveniles resemble adults.

== Distribution and habitat ==
It is found in Angola, Botswana, Lesotho, Namibia, and South Africa. Its natural habitats are subtropical or tropical dry shrubland and subtropical or tropical high-altitude grassland.
