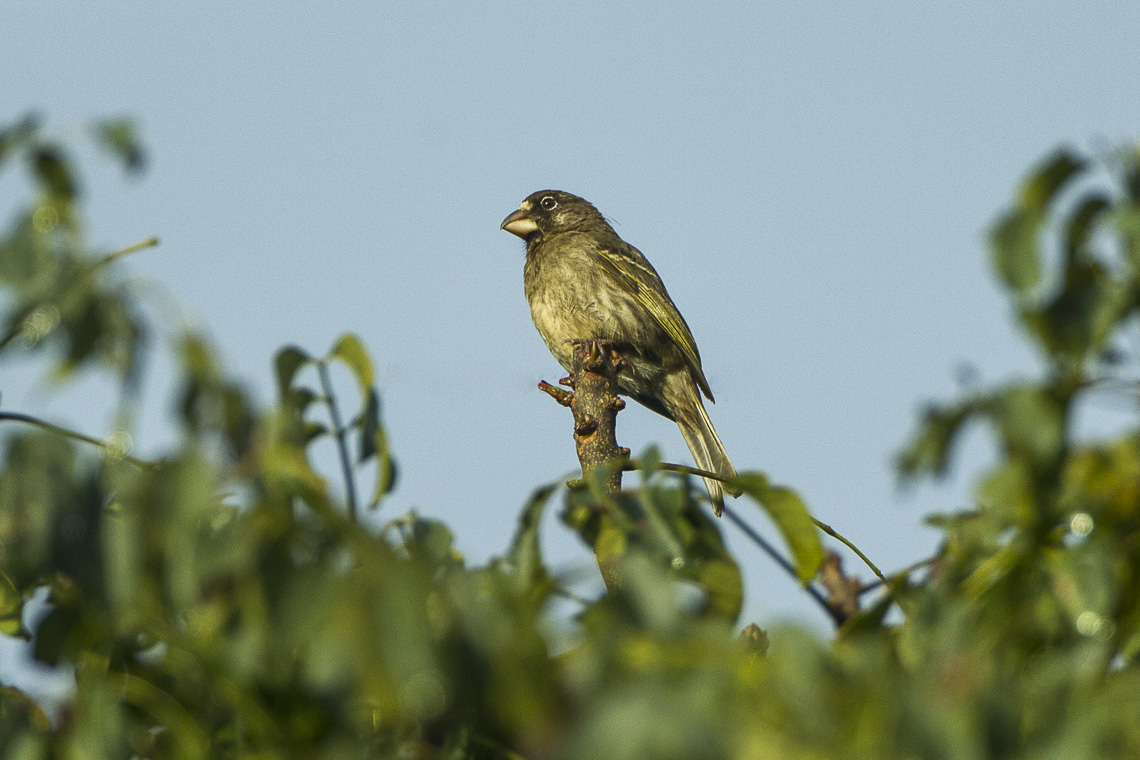

Conservation status
- Least Concern (IUCN 3.1)

Scientific classification
- Kingdom: Animalia
- Phylum: Chordata
- Class: Aves
- Order: Passeriformes
- Family: Fringillidae
- Subfamily: Carduelinae
- Genus: Crithagra
- Species: C. burtoni

Binomial name
- Crithagra burtoni (G.R. Gray, 1862)

Synonyms
- Serinus burtoni

= Thick-billed seedeater =

Species of bird

The thick-billed seedeater (Crithagra burtoni) is a species of finch in the family Fringillidae. It is native to the Western High Plateau and Bioko, the Albertine rift montane forests and the East African montane forests.

The thick-billed seedeater was formerly placed in the genus Serinus but phylogenetic analysis using mitochondrial and nuclear DNA sequences found that the genus was polyphyletic. The genus was therefore split and a number of species including the thick-billed seedeater were moved to the resurrected genus Crithagra.
