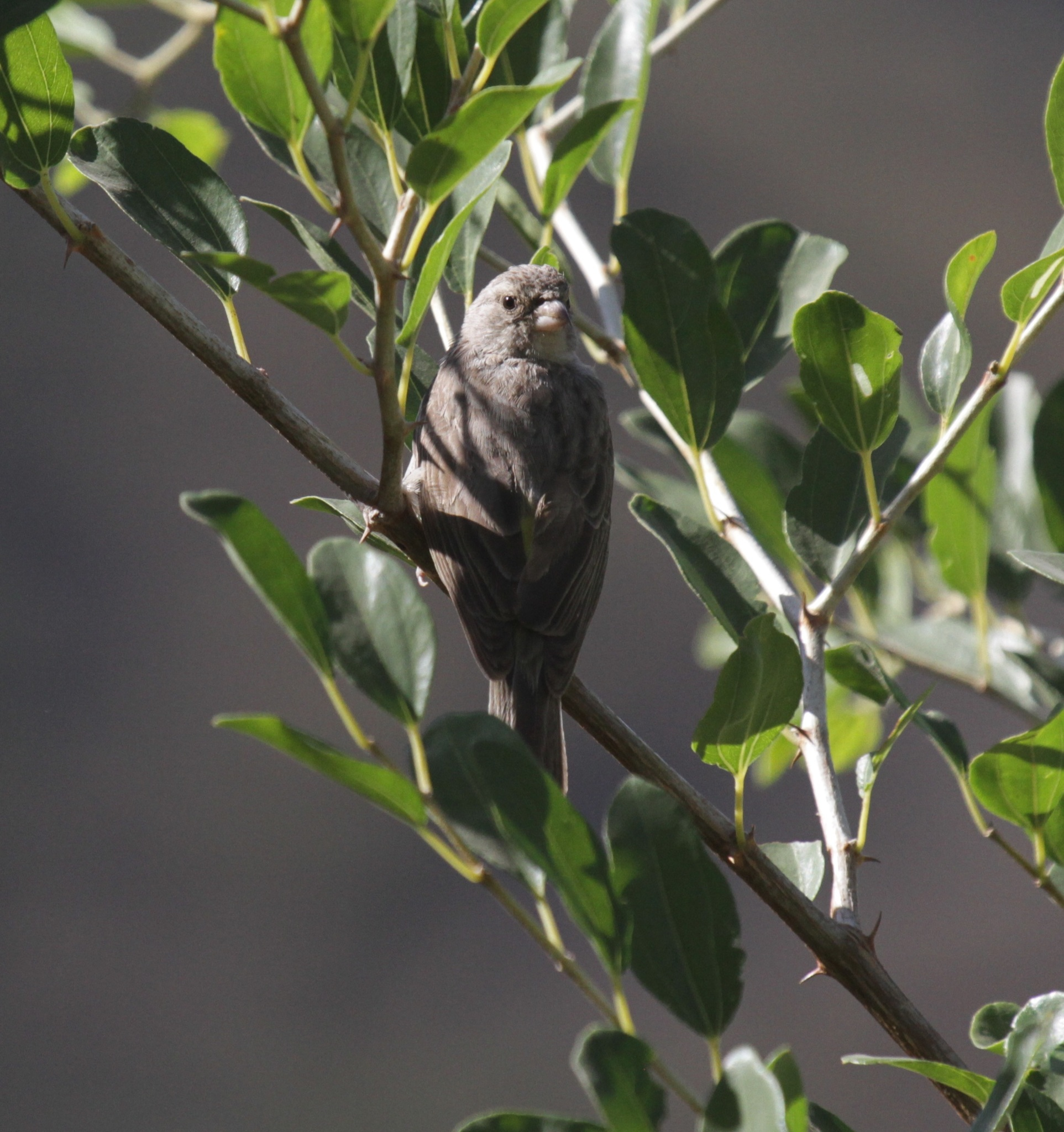

Conservation status
- Least Concern (IUCN 3.1)

Scientific classification
- Kingdom: Animalia
- Phylum: Chordata
- Class: Aves
- Order: Passeriformes
- Family: Fringillidae
- Subfamily: Carduelinae
- Genus: Crithagra
- Species: C. xanthopygia

Binomial name
- Crithagra xanthopygia (Rüppell, 1840)

Synonyms
- Serinus xanthopygius

= Yellow-rumped seedeater =

Species of bird

The yellow-rumped seedeater, yellow-rumped serin or Abyssinian yellow-rumped seedeater (Crithagra xanthopygia) is a species of finch in the family Fringillidae. It is native to the Ethiopian Highlands. Its natural habitat is subtropical or tropical dry shrubland.

The yellow-rumped seedeater was formerly placed in the genus Serinus but phylogenetic analysis using mitochondrial and nuclear DNA sequences found that the genus was polyphyletic. The genus was therefore split and a number of species including the yellow-rumped seedeater were moved to the resurrected genus Crithagra.
