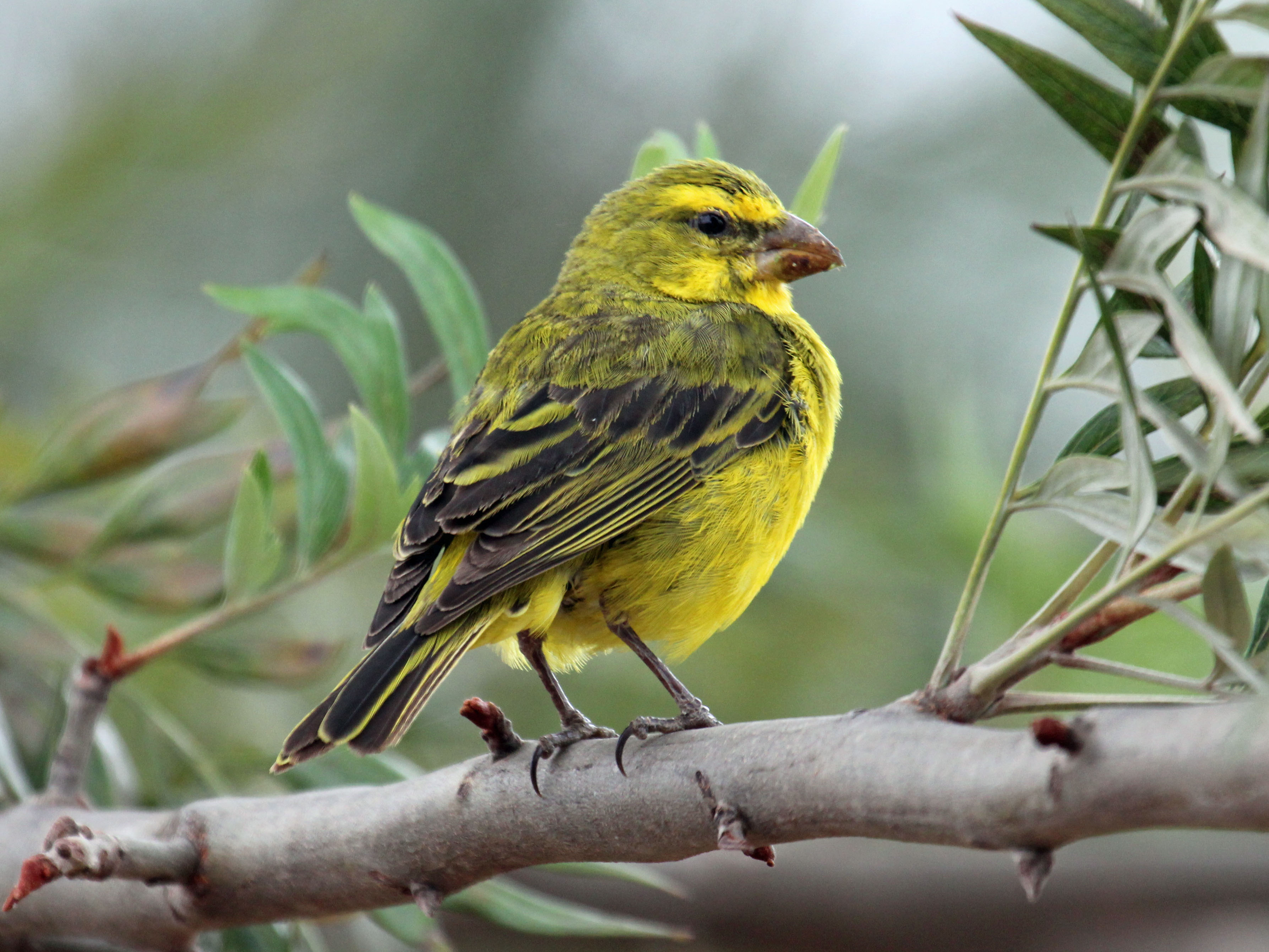
- Male brimstone canary (Crithagra sulphurata sharpii)

Scientific classification
- Kingdom: Animalia
- Phylum: Chordata
- Class: Aves
- Order: Passeriformes
- Family: Fringillidae
- Subfamily: Carduelinae
- Genus: Crithagra; Swainson, 1827

Type species
- Loxia sulphurata Linnaeus, 1766

Species
- See text

= Crithagra =

Genus of birds

Crithagra is a genus of small passerine birds in the finch family (Fringillidae). They live in Africa and Arabia.

The species in this genus were formerly assigned to the genus Serinus, but phylogenetic analysis of mitochondrial and nuclear DNA sequences found that the genus was polyphyletic. It was therefore split into two monophyletic genera. Eight species, including the European serin (Serinus serinus), were retained in Serinus, while the other species were assigned to the resurrected genus Crithagra.

== Species ==
The genus was introduced in 1827 by the English ornithologist William Swainson. The type species was subsequently designated as the brimstone canary. The name comes from the classical Greek krithē for "barley" and agra for "hunting".

The genus contains the following 38 species:

Image	Common name	Scientific name	Distribution
	Príncipe seedeater	Crithagra rufobrunnea	São Tomé and Príncipe
	São Tomé grosbeak	Crithagra concolor	São Tomé
	African citril	Crithagra citrinelloides	Ethiopia, Eritrea to western Kenya.
	Western citril	Crithagra frontalis	central Africa
	Southern citril	Crithagra hyposticta	South Sudan, Kenya, Tanzania, Zambia and Malawi.
	Black-faced canary	Crithagra capistrata	Angola, Burundi, Republic of the Congo, Democratic Republic of the Congo, Gabon, and Zambia.
	Papyrus canary	Crithagra koliensis	Burundi, Democratic Republic of the Congo, Kenya, Rwanda, Tanzania, and Uganda
	Forest canary	Crithagra scotops	Cameroon, Congo, and Kenya.
	White-rumped seedeater	Crithagra leucopygia	Sudan
	Black-throated canary	Crithagra atrogularis	Angola, Botswana, Burundi, Republic of the Congo, Democratic Republic of the Congo, Gabon, Kenya, Lesotho, Namibia, Rwanda, South Africa, Tanzania, Uganda, Zambia, and Zimbabwe.
	Yellow-rumped seedeater	Crithagra xanthopygia	Eritrea, Kenya and Ethiopia.
	Reichenow's seedeater	Crithagra reichenowi	eastern Africa
	Arabian serin	Crithagra rothschildi	Southwestern Arabian foothills savanna
	Yellow-throated seedeater	Crithagra flavigula	Ethiopia.
	Salvadori's seedeater	Crithagra xantholaema	Ethiopia.
	Lemon-breasted canary	Crithagra citrinipectus	Malawi, Mozambique, South Africa, Zambia, and Zimbabwe.
	Yellow-fronted canary	Crithagra mozambica	Africa south of the Sahara Desert.
	White-bellied canary	Crithagra dorsostriata	Ethiopia, Kenya, Somalia, South Sudan, Tanzania, and Uganda.
	Ankober serin	Crithagra ankoberensis	Ethiopia
	Yemen serin	Crithagra menachensis	Southwestern Arabian foothills savanna
	Cape siskin	Crithagra totta	South Africa.
	Drakensberg siskin	Crithagra symonsi	South Africa,
	Northern grosbeak-canary	Crithagra donaldsoni	Ethiopia, Kenya, and Somalia.
	Southern grosbeak-canary	Crithagra buchanani	Kenya and Tanzania.
	Yellow canary	Crithagra flaviventris	southern Africa
	Brimstone canary	Crithagra sulphurata	central and southern Africa.
	Stripe-breasted seedeater	Crithagra striatipectus	Sudan, Ethiopia, and Kenya.
	Reichard's seedeater	Crithagra reichardi	Zambia, Malawi and Tanzania
	Streaky-headed seedeater	Crithagra gularis	southern Africa.
	West African seedeater	Crithagra canicapilla	Guinea, Sierra Leone, southern Mali and northern Ivory Coast across to southern Niger and northern Cameroon
	Black-eared seedeater	Crithagra mennelli	Angola, Botswana, Democratic Republic of the Congo, Malawi, Mozambique, Namibia, South Africa, Tanzania, Zambia, and Zimbabwe.
	Brown-rumped seedeater	Crithagra tristriata	Ethiopia, Eritrea and Somalia.
	White-throated canary	Crithagra albogularis	Angola, Botswana, Lesotho, Namibia, and South Africa.
	Thick-billed seedeater	Crithagra burtoni	Angola, Burundi, Cameroon, Democratic Republic of the Congo, Kenya, Nigeria, Rwanda, Tanzania, and Uganda.
	Streaky seedeater	Crithagra striolata	Burundi, Democratic Republic of the Congo, Eritrea, Ethiopia, Kenya, Rwanda, South Sudan, Tanzania, Uganda, and Zambia.
	Yellow-browed seedeater	Crithagra whytii	Malawi, Tanzania, and Zambia.
	Kipengere seedeater	Crithagra melanochroa	Tanzania
	Protea canary	Crithagra leucoptera	South Africa.
