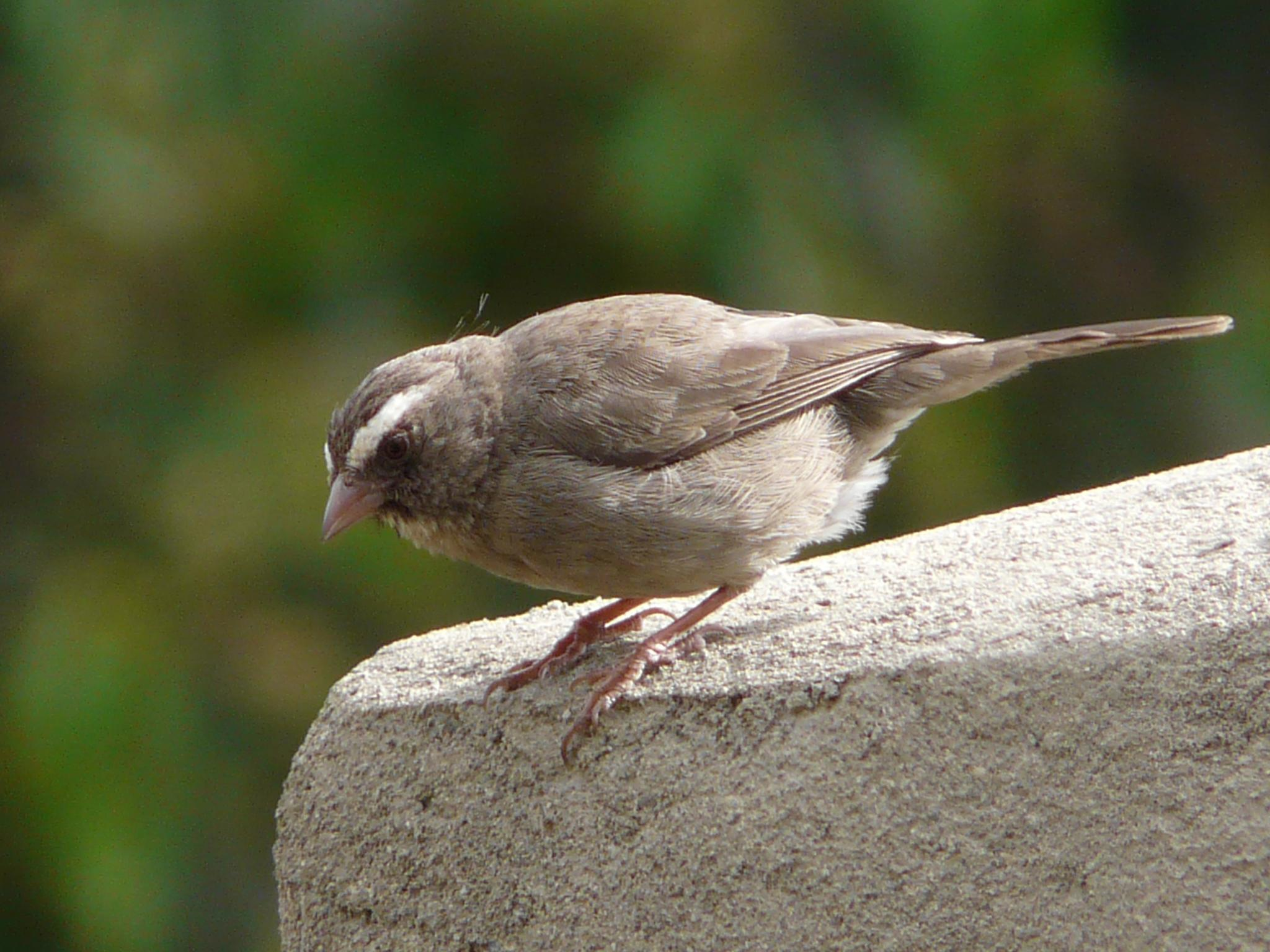
- In Ethiopia

Conservation status
- Least Concern (IUCN 3.1)

Scientific classification
- Kingdom: Animalia
- Phylum: Chordata
- Class: Aves
- Order: Passeriformes
- Family: Fringillidae
- Subfamily: Carduelinae
- Genus: Crithagra
- Species: C. tristriata

Binomial name
- Crithagra tristriata (Rüppell, 1840)

Synonyms
- Serinus tristriatus

= Brown-rumped seedeater =

Species of bird

The brown-rumped seedeater (Crithagra tristriata) is a species of finch in the family Fringillidae. It is native to the Ethiopian Highlands and Karkaar (Somaliland). It is widespread in towns, villages, gardens, plantations and upland heath.

The brown-rumped seedeater was formerly placed in the genus Serinus, but phylogenetic analysis using mitochondrial and nuclear DNA sequences found that the genus was polyphyletic. The genus was therefore split and a number of species including the brown-rumped seedeater were moved to the resurrected genus Crithagra.

== Description ==
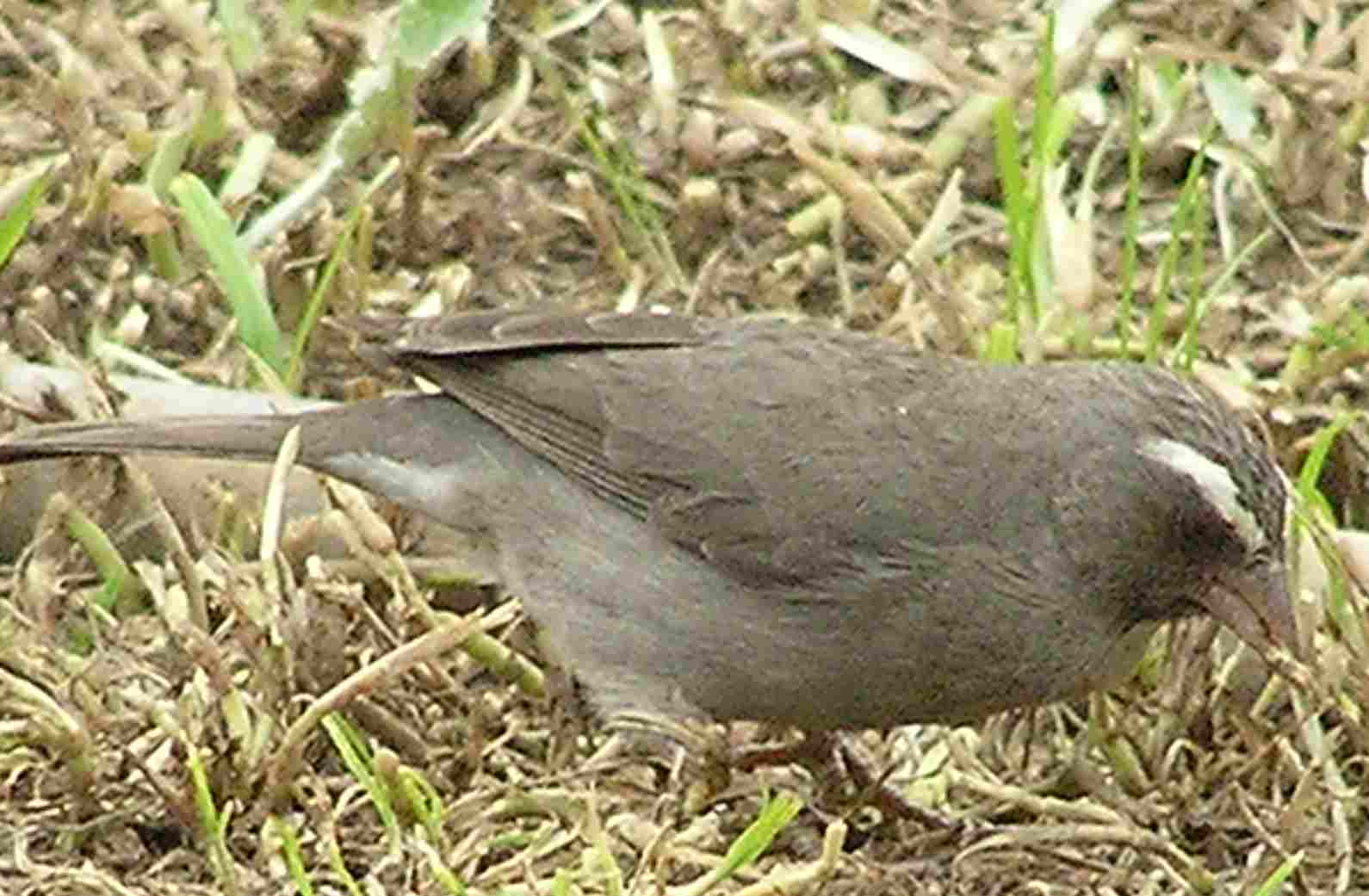
Foraging brown-rumped seedeater in Debre Berhan, Ethiopia

The brown-rumped seedeater is typically 13 cm long. It is a uniform grey-brown with a small white supercilium, and has a plain (not streaked or spotted) breast with white under the chin. Its uniformity means its eponymous 'brown rump' is often not apparent. It feeds on some small seeds and grains in plants and other small shrubs.
