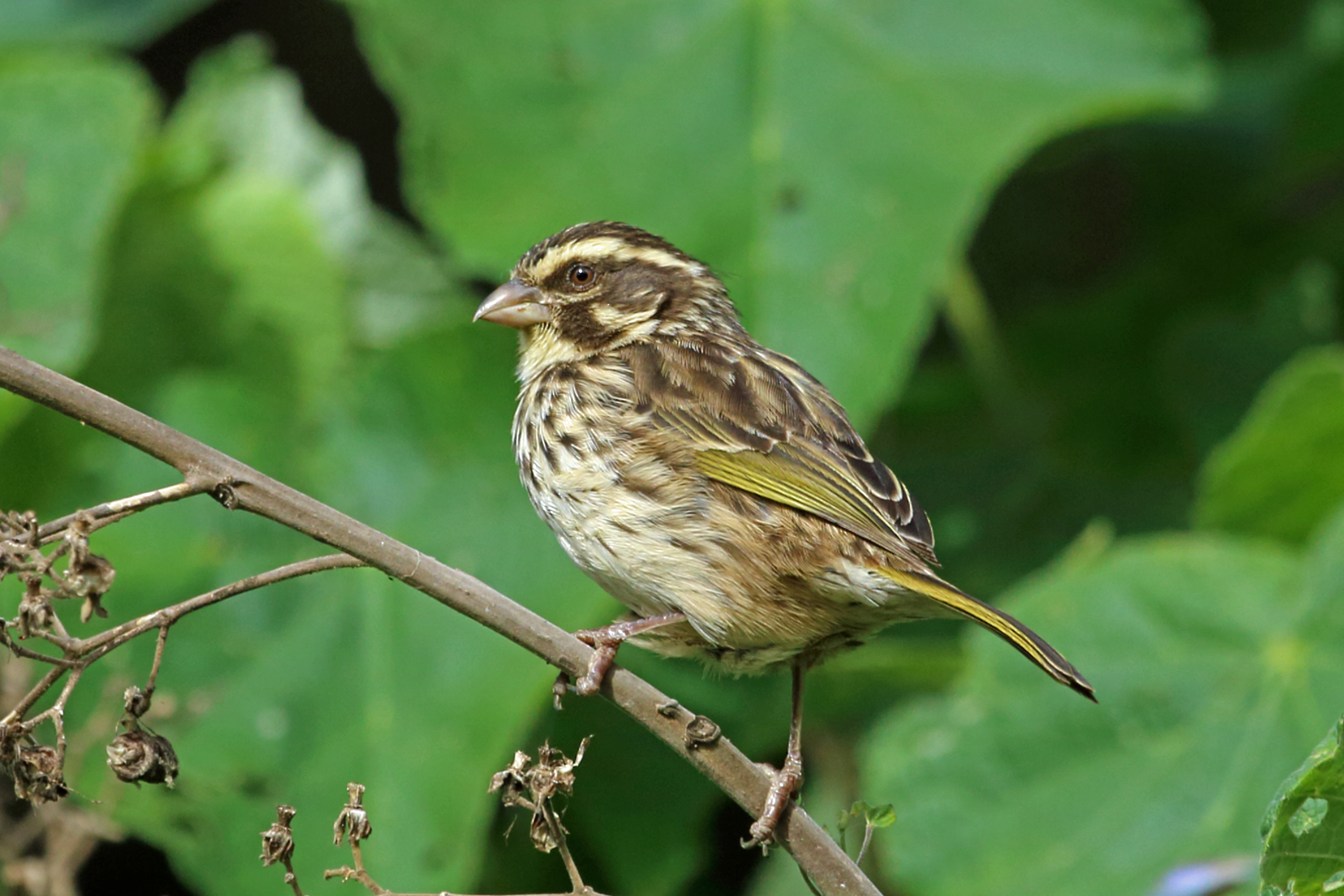

Conservation status
- Least Concern (IUCN 3.1)

Scientific classification
- Kingdom: Animalia
- Phylum: Chordata
- Class: Aves
- Order: Passeriformes
- Family: Fringillidae
- Subfamily: Carduelinae
- Genus: Crithagra
- Species: C. striolata

Binomial name
- Crithagra striolata (Rüppell, 1840)

Synonyms
- Serinus striolatus

= Streaky seedeater =

Species of bird

The streaky seedeater (Crithagra striolata) is a species of finch in the family Fringillidae. It is native to the eastern Afromontane.

== Phylogeny ==
The streaky seedeater was formerly placed in the genus Serinus but phylogenetic analysis using mitochondrial and nuclear DNA sequences found that the genus was polyphyletic. The genus was therefore split and a number of species including the streaky seedeater were moved to the resurrected genus Crithagra.

== Habitat ==
In the Degua Tembien mountains, the bird was found to be a breeding resident of woodland edges, scrubland and forest edges.

== Gallery ==
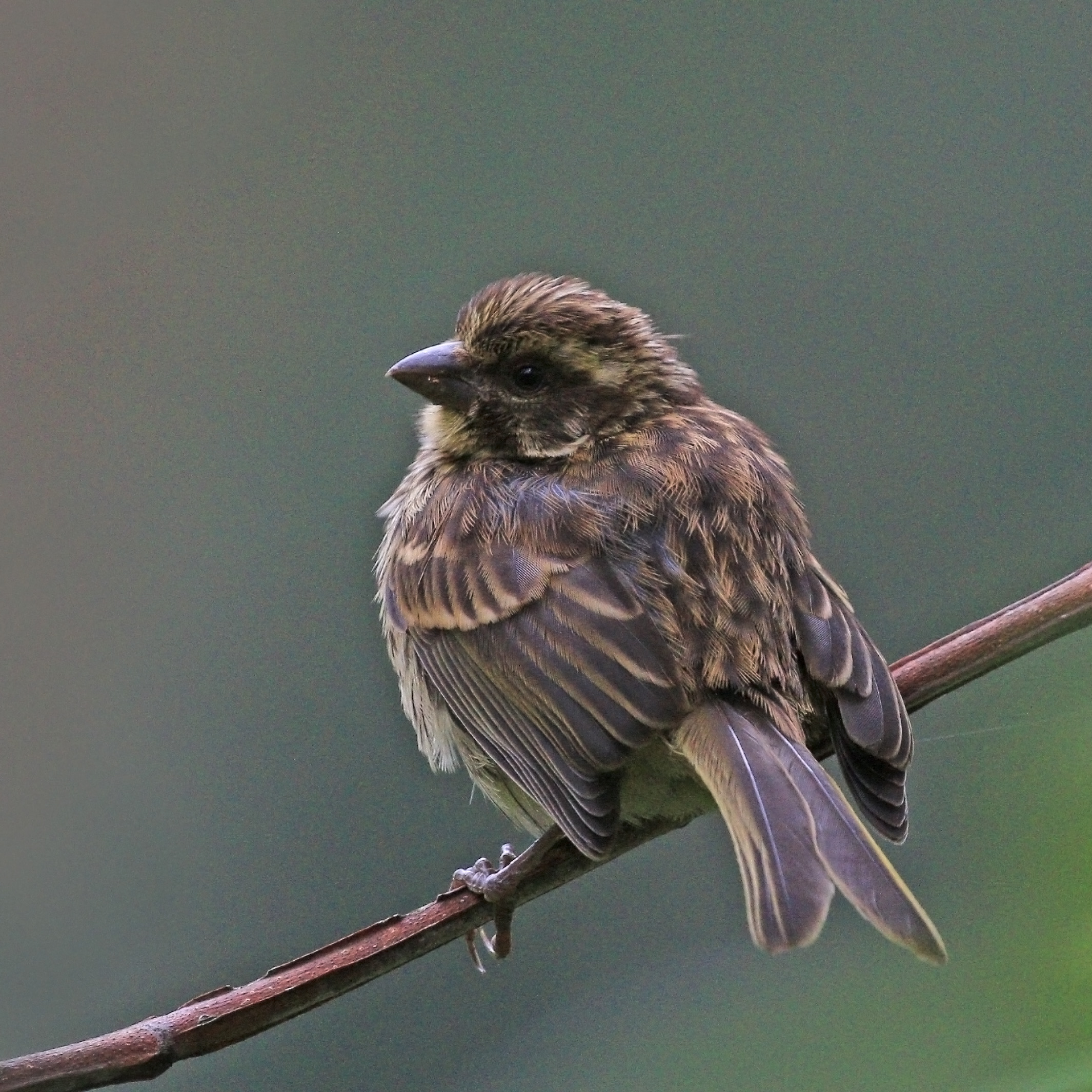
juvenile C. s. graueri
Sabyinyo Silverback Lodge, Rwanda

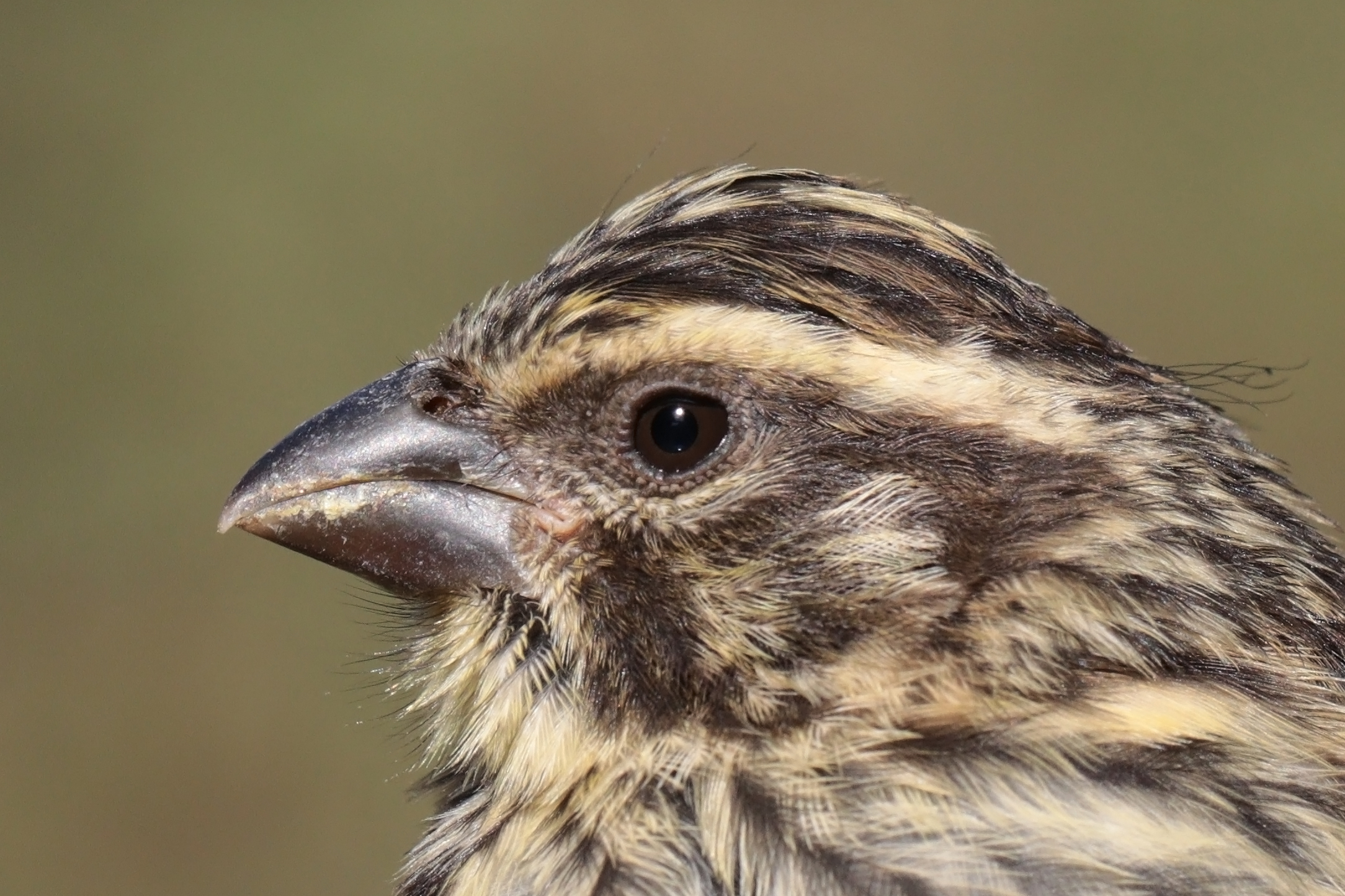
C. s. striolata
Bale Mountains, Ethiopia
