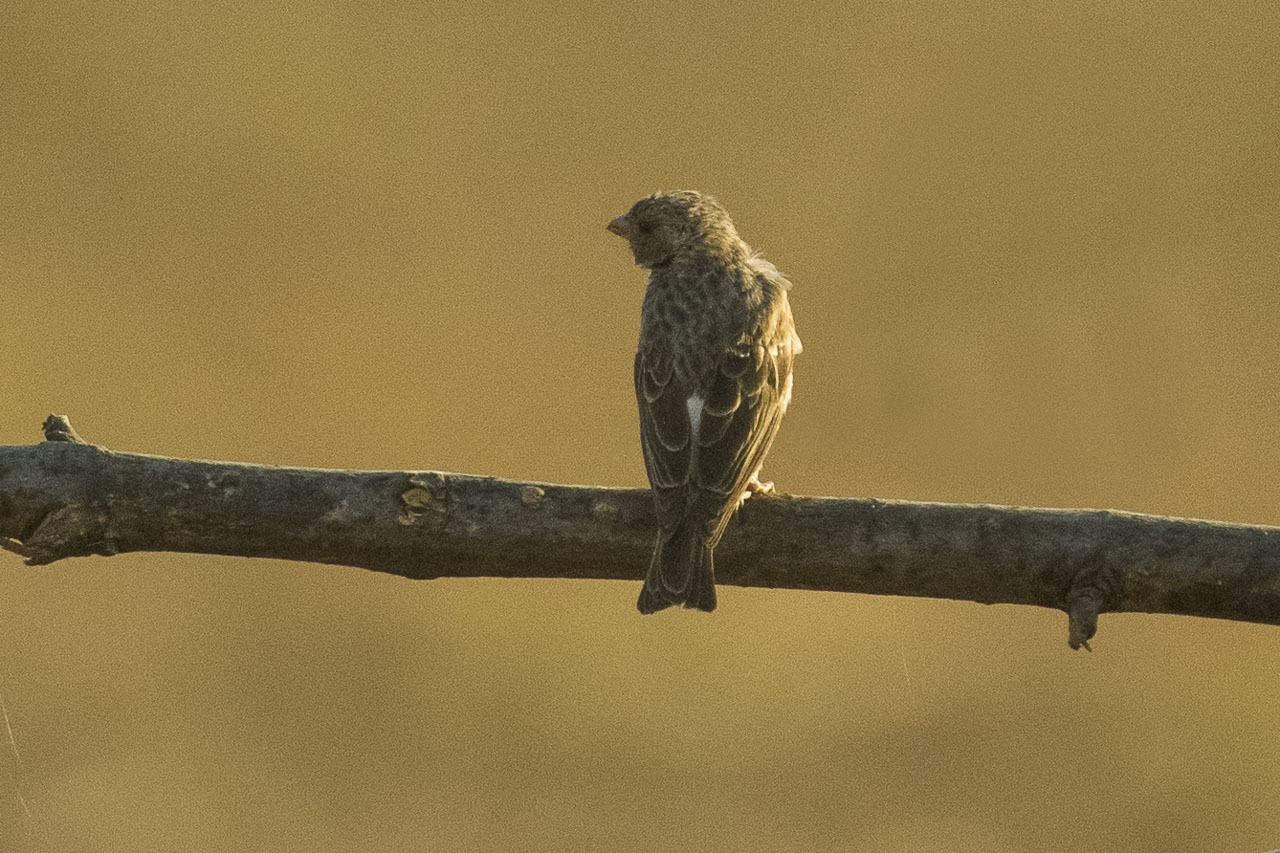

Conservation status
- Least Concern (IUCN 3.1)

Scientific classification
- Kingdom: Animalia
- Phylum: Chordata
- Class: Aves
- Order: Passeriformes
- Family: Fringillidae
- Subfamily: Carduelinae
- Genus: Crithagra
- Species: C. leucopygia

Binomial name
- Crithagra leucopygia Sundevall, 1850

Synonyms
- Serinus leucopygius

= White-rumped seedeater =

Species of bird

The white-rumped seedeater (Crithagra leucopygia) is a species of finch in the family Fringillidae. It is found throughout the Sahel and the eastern part of the Sudan region. Its natural habitat is dry savanna. It is known elsewhere and in aviculture as the grey singing finch.

The white-rumped seedeater was formerly placed in the genus Serinus but phylogenetic analysis using mitochondrial and nuclear DNA sequences found that the genus was polyphyletic. The genus was therefore split and a number of species including the white-rumped seedeater were moved to the resurrected genus Crithagra Swainson 1827.
