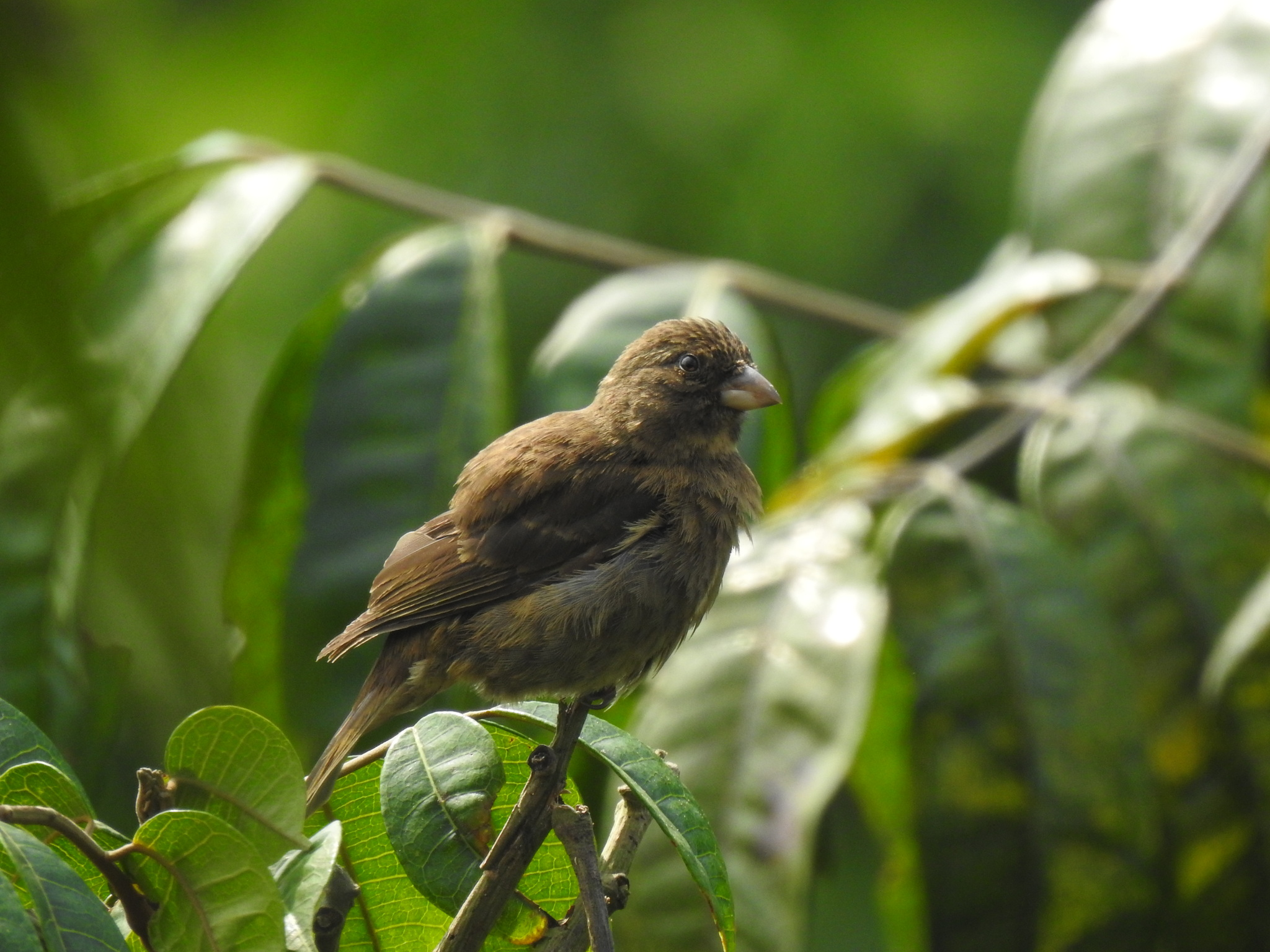
- Crithagra rufobrunnea thomensis in São Tomé

Conservation status
- Least Concern (IUCN 3.1)

Scientific classification
- Kingdom: Animalia
- Phylum: Chordata
- Class: Aves
- Order: Passeriformes
- Family: Fringillidae
- Subfamily: Carduelinae
- Genus: Crithagra
- Species: C. rufobrunnea

Binomial name
- Crithagra rufobrunnea (G.R. Gray, 1862)

Synonyms
- Serinus rufobrunneus (Gray, 1862)

= Príncipe seedeater =

Species of bird

The Príncipe seedeater (Crithagra rufobrunnea) is a species of finch in the family Fringillidae. It is found only on the islands of São Tomé and Príncipe off the west coast of Africa. Its natural habitats are subtropical or tropical dry forest and subtropical or tropical moist lowland forest.

The Príncipe seedeater was formerly placed in the genus Serinus but phylogenetic analysis using mitochondrial and nuclear DNA sequences found that the genus was polyphyletic. The genus was therefore split and a number of species including the Príncipe seedeater were moved to the resurrected genus Crithagra.

== Subspecies ==
Three subspecies are currently recognised:

- Crithagra rufobrunnea rufobrunnea, the nominate subspecies, endemic to Príncipe. Colour cinnamon-brown.
- Crithagra rufobrunnea thomensis, endemic to São Tomé. More greenish than the other subspecies, with a dull olive-brown colouration and a off-white patch on the throat.
- Crithagra rufobrunnea fradei, endemic to the Jockey's Bonnet islet off the southern coast of Príncipe. Larger than the nominate subspecies, with somewhat more reddish coloration and a darker bill.
