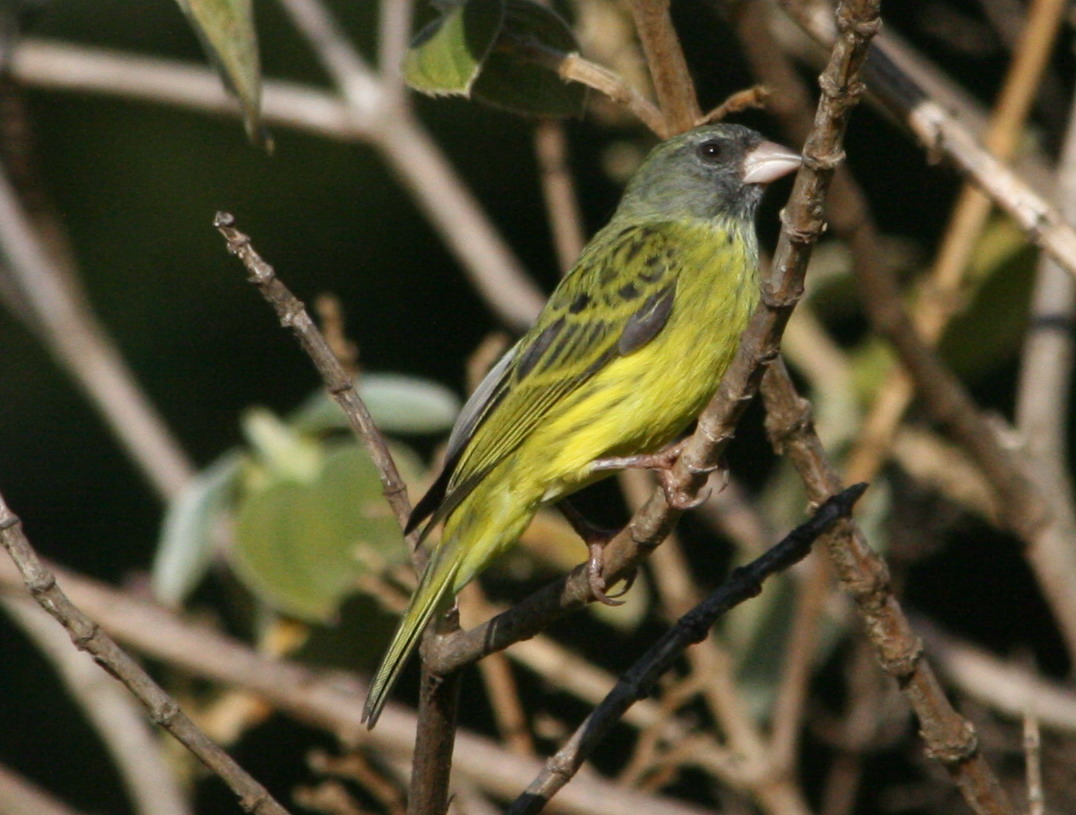

Conservation status
- Least Concern (IUCN 3.1)

Scientific classification
- Kingdom: Animalia
- Phylum: Chordata
- Class: Aves
- Order: Passeriformes
- Family: Fringillidae
- Subfamily: Carduelinae
- Genus: Crithagra
- Species: C. hyposticta

Binomial name
- Crithagra hyposticta (Reichenow, 1904)

Synonyms
- Serinus hypostictus

= Southern citril =

Species of bird

The southern citril (Crithagra hyposticta or Serinus hyposticus) is a species of finch in the Fringillidae family. It is endemic to the eastern Afromontane.

The southern citril was formerly placed in the genus Serinus but phylogenetic analysis using mitochondrial and nuclear DNA sequences found that the genus was polyphyletic. The genus was therefore split and a number of species including the southern citril were moved to the resurrected genus Crithagra.
