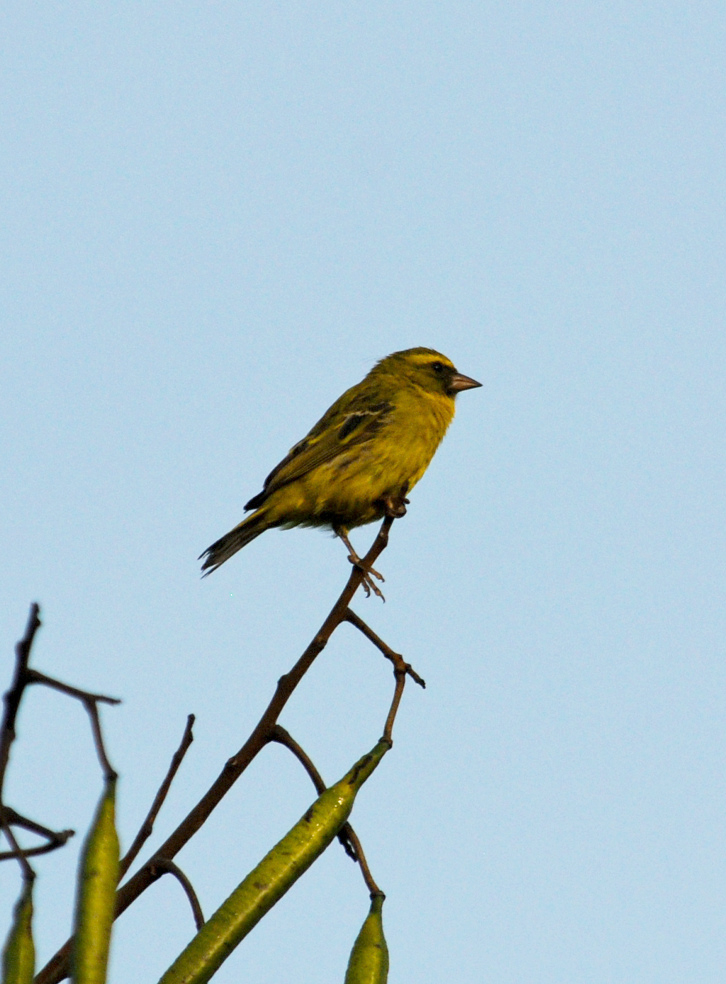

Conservation status
- Least Concern (IUCN 3.1)

Scientific classification
- Kingdom: Animalia
- Phylum: Chordata
- Class: Aves
- Order: Passeriformes
- Family: Fringillidae
- Subfamily: Carduelinae
- Genus: Crithagra
- Species: C. frontalis

Binomial name
- Crithagra frontalis (Reichenow, 1904)

Synonyms
- Serinus frontalis

= Western citril =

Species of bird

The western citril (Crithagra frontalis), also known as the yellow-browed citril, is a species of finch in the family Fringillidae. It is found in central Africa.

The western citril was formerly placed in the genus Serinus but phylogenetic analysis using mitochondrial and nuclear DNA sequences found that the genus was polyphyletic. The genus was therefore split and a number of species including the western citril were moved to the resurrected genus Crithagra.
