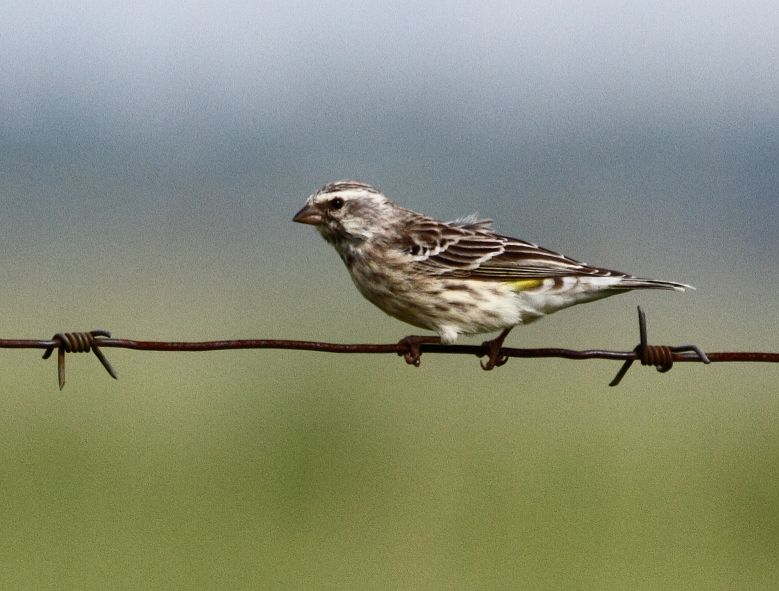

Conservation status
- Least Concern (IUCN 3.1)

Scientific classification
- Kingdom: Animalia
- Phylum: Chordata
- Class: Aves
- Order: Passeriformes
- Family: Fringillidae
- Subfamily: Carduelinae
- Genus: Crithagra
- Species: C. atrogularis

Binomial name
- Crithagra atrogularis (Smith, 1836)

Synonyms
- Serinus atrogularis

= Black-throated canary =

Species of bird

The black-throated canary (Crithagra atrogularis), also known as the black-throated seedeater, is a species of finch in the family Fringillidae.

== Distribution ==
It is found frequently in Angola, Botswana, Burundi, the Republic of the Congo, the Democratic Republic of the Congo, Gabon, Kenya, Lesotho, Namibia, Rwanda, South Africa, Tanzania, Uganda, Zambia, and Zimbabwe. Its natural habitats are subtropical or tropical dry forest, dry savanna, and subtropical or tropical dry shrubland.

== Taxonomy ==
The black-throated canary was formerly placed in the genus Serinus but phylogenetic analysis using mitochondrial and nuclear DNA sequences found that the genus was polyphyletic. The genus was therefore split and a number of species including the black-throated canary were moved to the resurrected genus Crithagra.
