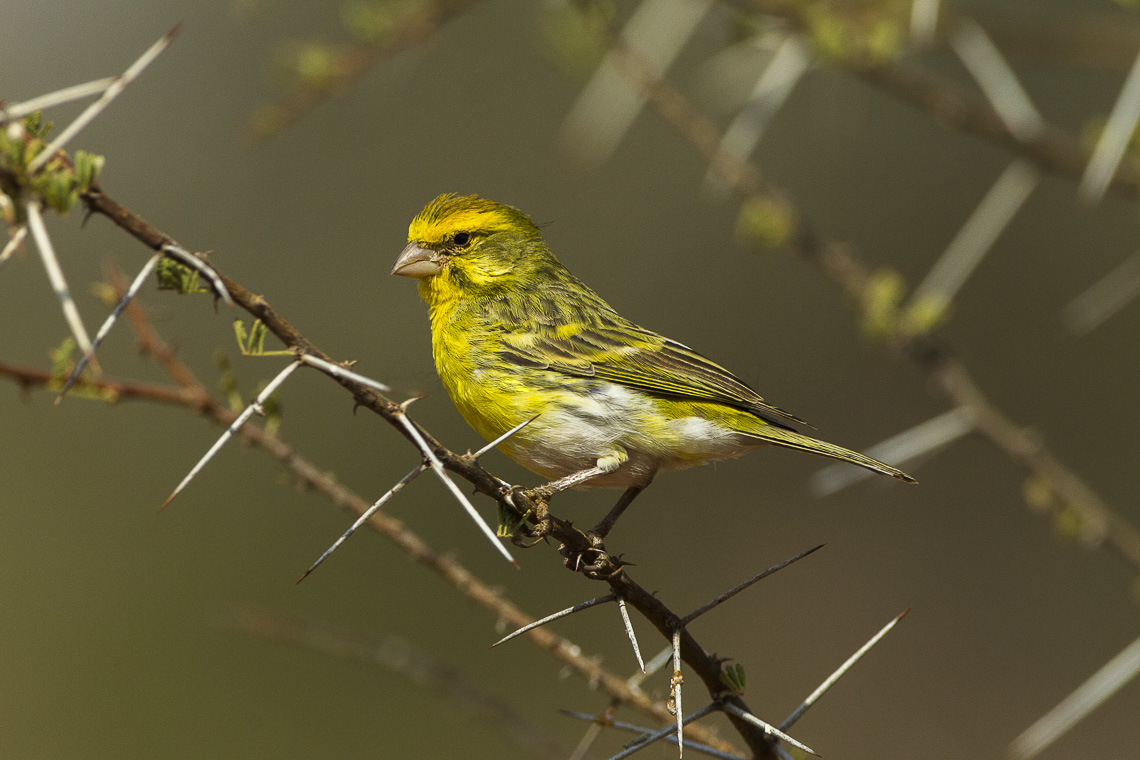

Conservation status
- Least Concern (IUCN 3.1)

Scientific classification
- Kingdom: Animalia
- Phylum: Chordata
- Class: Aves
- Order: Passeriformes
- Family: Fringillidae
- Subfamily: Carduelinae
- Genus: Crithagra
- Species: C. dorsostriata

Binomial name
- Crithagra dorsostriata Reichenow, 1887

Synonyms
- Serinus dorsostriatus

= White-bellied canary =

Species of bird

The white-bellied canary (Crithagra dorsostriata) is a species of finch in the family Fringillidae. It is found in Ethiopia, Kenya, Somalia, South Sudan, Tanzania, and Uganda. Its natural habitat is dry savanna.

The white-bellied canary was formerly placed in the genus Serinus but phylogenetic analysis using mitochondrial and nuclear DNA sequences found that the genus was polyphyletic. The genus was therefore split and a number of species including the white-bellied canary were moved to the resurrected genus Crithagra.
