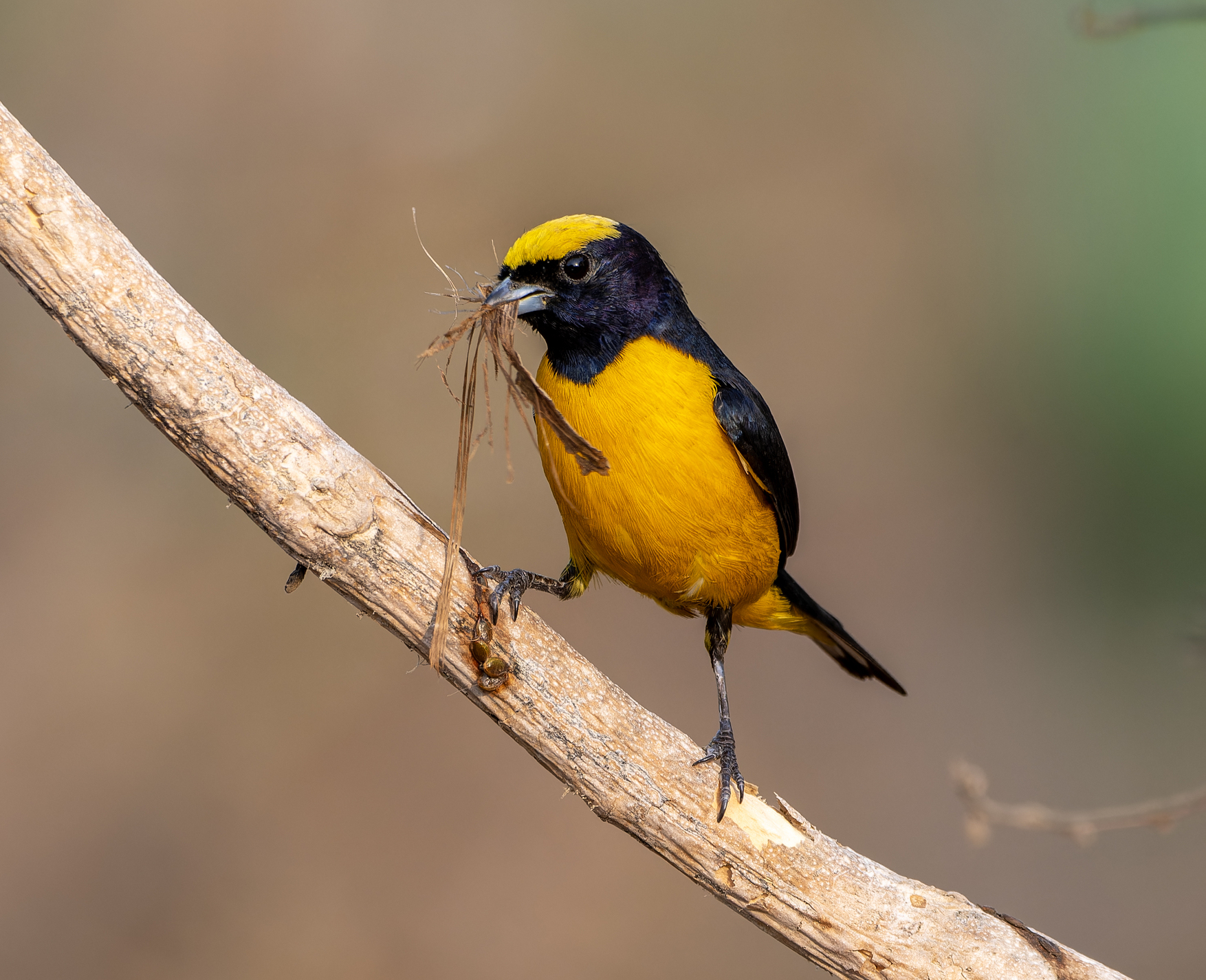

Conservation status
- Least Concern (IUCN 3.1)

Scientific classification
- Kingdom: Animalia
- Phylum: Chordata
- Class: Aves
- Order: Passeriformes
- Family: Fringillidae
- Subfamily: Euphoniinae
- Genus: Euphonia
- Species: E. trinitatis

Binomial name
- Euphonia trinitatis Strickland, 1851

Synonyms
- Euphonia chlorotica trinitatis

= Trinidad euphonia =

Species of bird

The Trinidad euphonia (Euphonia trinitatis) is a species of bird in the family Fringillidae. It is common in northern Colombia and northern Venezuela and uncommon to rare on the Caribbean island of Trinidad. Like all euphonias, it is small, stocky, and short-tailed; unlike some, it is sexually dimorphic. The male is glossy blue-black on the head, back, throat, and upper breast, with a bright yellow forehead and crown, and bright yellow underparts. The female is olive-green above and yellow-olive below, with a grayer patch running down the center of her breast and abdomen, and bright yellow undertail coverts. Its calls are high-pitched, plaintive whistles: the two most common are a single-pitched, double-noted "pee pee" or "tee dee", or a rising, double-noted "puwee", "cooleee" or "duu dee". Its song is a short, jumbled mix of musical and nonmusical notes.

It is primarily a fruit-eater, specializing on mistletoe berries, but also eating other fruits, as well as occasional seeds and invertebrates. Pairs are monogamous, and stay together year round. Both parents build a globular nest of dried grass and stems, lined with finer material and with a side entrance. The female lays three to four cream-colored, brown-splotched eggs, which she alone incubates. Both parents feed the hatched chicks. English ornithologist Hugh Edwin Strickland first described the Trinidad euphonia in 1851. It has no subspecies. Across its range, it is considered a species of least concern, though it is rare on Trinidad due to overtrapping for the caged bird trade.

== Taxonomy and systematics ==
English ornithologist Hugh Edwin Strickland first described the Trinidad euphonia in 1851, using a specimen collected on the island of Trinidad; he named it Euphonia trinitatis. It has sometimes been considered to be a superspecies with the scrub, yellow-crowned and purple-throated euphonias. This designation indicates that these species evolved from a common ancestor relatively recently and are thought to be closely related, but not closely enough to be considered subspecies. On the other hand, the Trinidad euphonia is sometimes thought to be a subspecies of the very similar purple-throated euphonia. Its range is largely distinct, or allopatric, from that of the latter species, overlapping only in a narrow zone in eastern Venezuela. However, genetic studies reported in 2020 indicate that its closest relatives are the scrub and yellow-crowned euphonias, and that it is more distantly related to the purple-throated euphonia. It is monotypic across its range.

When Anselme Gaëtan Desmarest created the genus Euphonia in 1806, he assigned it to the tanager family Thraupidae. There it remained for nearly 200 years, until molecular DNA studies done in the late 20th and early 21st century revealed that euphonias were more closely related to the finches than the tanagers. The genus was moved to the family Fringillidae as a result of these studies.

The genus name Euphonia is Ancient Greek for "euphony" or "excellence of tone". The species name trinitatis commemorates the bird's type locality—the island of Trinidad.

== Description ==
The Trinidad euphonia is a small, stout, short-tailed passerine, measuring 9.7–11 cm (3.8–4.3 in) in length (Note: By convention, length is measured from the tip of the bill to the tip of the tail on a dead bird (or skin) laid on its back.) and weighing 8.8–14 g (0.31–0.49 oz). It is sexually dimorphic in plumage. The male is glossy blue-black on the head, back, chin, and throat, with a bright yellow forehead and crown, and bright yellow underparts. The basal half of his rectrices are white, as are his underwing coverts; the latter results in a white stripe on his underwing when he flies. He also has white on the inner webs of the outer two to three tail feathers; this appears as two large white ovals on the undertail. The yellow on his crown extends well behind his eyes. The female is olive-green above and yellow-olive below, with a grayer patch running down the center of her breast and abdomen, and bright yellow undertail coverts. Both sexes have dark brown irises, and gray legs and feet. The bill is black with a white base to the lower mandible.

=== Vocalizations ===
A "notably vocal" species, the Trinidad euphonia has whistled calls that are high-pitched, plaintive, and hard to locate. The male typically sits at or near the top of a tree to call, often sitting on a semi-exposed or bare branch. One regular call, variously transcribed as "pee", "tee", or "dee", is typically doubled, though sometimes it is repeated 3–5 times, and exceptionally up to 20. The notes of this call are always on the same pitch, and can be heard from a considerable distance. Another regular call, transcribed as "duu dee", "puwee", or "cooleee", is sung rapidly on two pitches, with the second note higher. A third call is a mournful "siu". The song is a short, jumbled mix of musical and nonmusical notes, which it often alternates with its calls. The female's responding calls are shorter and "less penetrating" than the male's.

=== Similar species ===
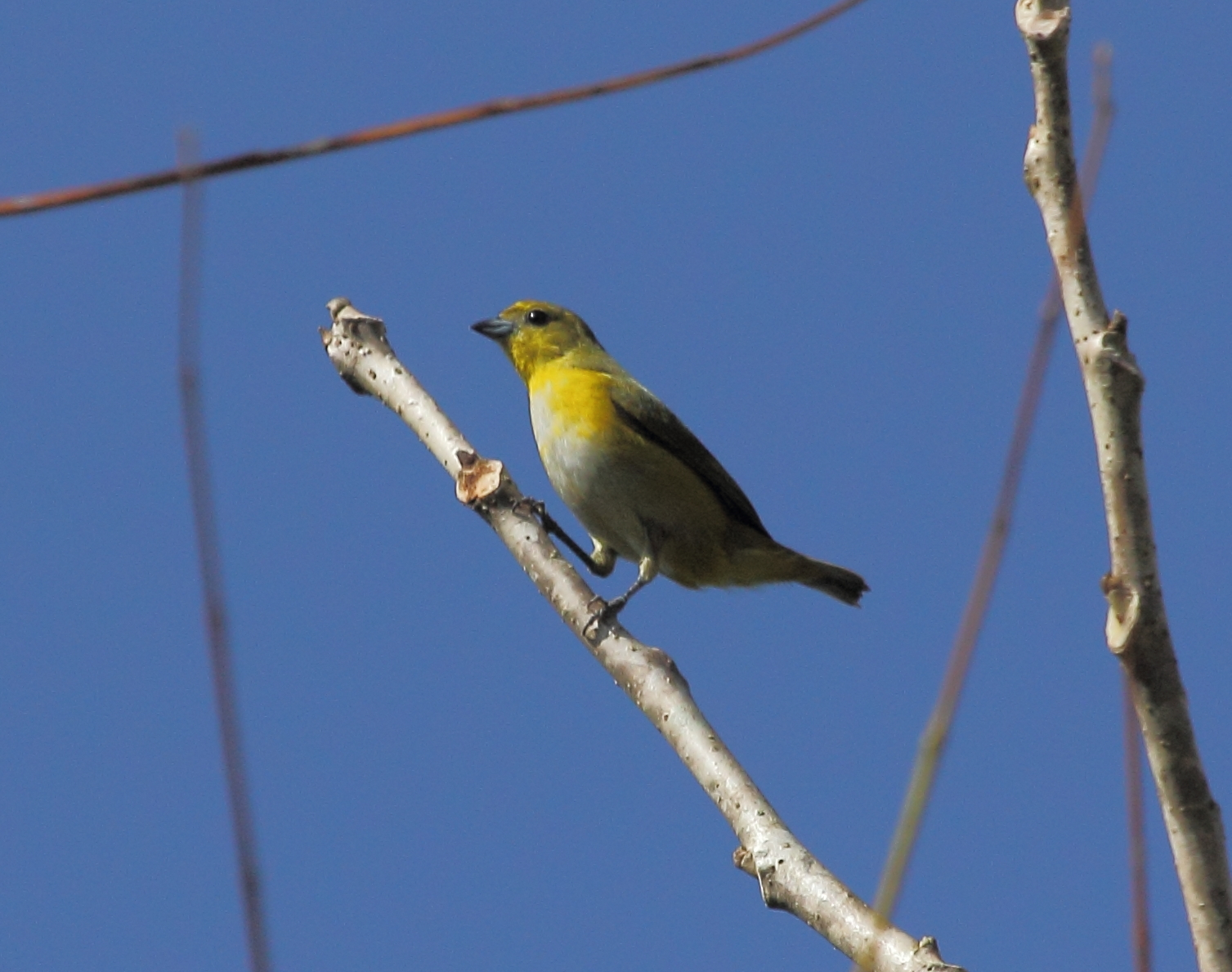
Females show a grayish patch in the center of their belly and abdomen.

The Trinidad euphonia is similar in appearance to a number of other euphonia species. The male's dark throat distinguishes it from male thick-billed and violaceous euphonias, both of which have yellow throats. The female can be told from female thick-billed and violaceous euphonias by her smaller size and smaller, finer bill; the gray on her breast and belly is also distinctive. The male orange-bellied euphonia has a rufous rather than yellow forehead, and darker underparts, while the female sports a grayish nape. The most likely confusion species is the marginally larger purple-throated euphonia. Male purple-throated euphonias tend to be glossed with a purplish rather than bluish sheen; their yellow crown extends to just behind their eyes. Females are virtually indistinguishable from female purple-throated euphonias (which have a slight grayish tinge to the upperparts) and both they and immature birds are not thought to be separable in the field.

== Distribution and habitat ==
The Trinidad euphonia is found in northern Colombia, northern Venezuela, and Trinidad. A single Tobago record is regarded as a probable escaped cage bird. On Trinidad, it is found primarily in second growth and hill forest near mistletoe and in cultivated areas with large trees, though on the west coast it is also found in mangroves. On the mainland, it occurs in the tropical zone at elevations up to 1,100 m (3,600 ft), and is especially common in arid regions. Habitats include dry forest, the edges of moist forest, light woodland, scrub, and cultivated areas. In moister forest, it is replaced by the purple-throated euphonia. There have been several exceptionally high sight-only (i.e. undocumented) records in Venezuela: one at 1,200 m (3,900 ft) and another at 1,450 m (4,760 ft).

== Behavior and ecology ==
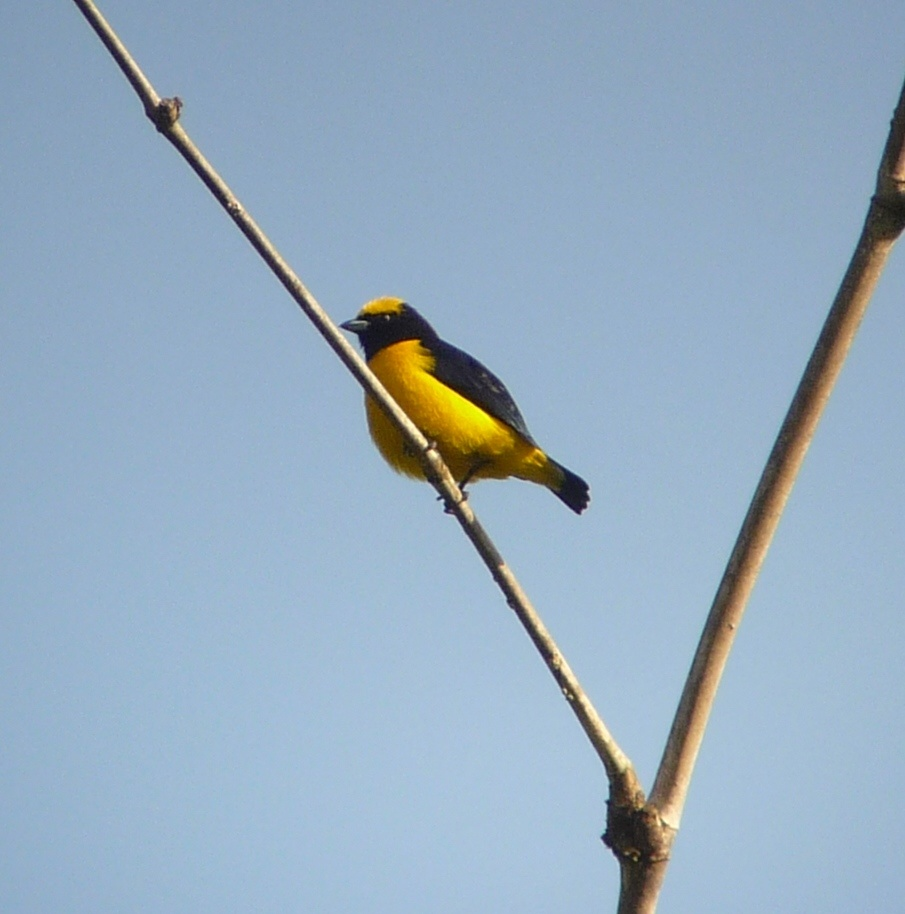
The male's yellow crown extends back behind his eyes.

The Trinidad euphonia spends much of its time in the treetops. It is typically found in pairs or groups of up to eight. Although it seldom joins mixed-species flocks, it readily joins mobs that are harassing snakes, owls, or other predators. It is known to wander widely.

=== Breeding and nesting ===
The Trinidad euphonia is monogamous, with pairs remaining together year-round. The breeding season runs from January to April in Trinidad, but is generally restricted to April in Colombia and Venezuela. The pair court by flicking their wings and twitching from side to side, bowing low, with the male displaying his bright crown. Both sexes build the nest, which is a round ball of dried grass and stems. It has a circular entrance in the side and is lined with finer material. This can be located from 1.4 to 12 m (4 ft 7 in to 39 ft 4 in) off the ground, and may be built in a variety of locations. Sometimes they are tucked into large bromeliads and occasionally they are hung from the end of a branch. One has been found in a hollow stump. The female lays 3–4 eggs, which are white or cream with irregular dark brown splotches and measure 17.7 mm × 12.9 mm (0.70 in × 0.51 in). Only she incubates them, but both parents feed the hatched youngsters. The generation length is estimated to be 3.5 years.

=== Feeding ===
Like all euphonias, the Trinidad euphonia is primarily a frugivore, feeding mostly on small berries—particularly mistletoes in the genera Loranthus and Phthirusa. Unlike some euphonias, it eats insects, which it collects from spiderwebs and the underside of small twigs. It also takes various other invertebrates and seeds. It has an abnormal stomach, lacking the muscular gizzard of most birds. This may be an adaptation to deal with mistletoe berries, as this stomach modification is shared with other Euphonia species that have similarly specialized diets. It forages noisily and actively, either alone or in small groups, and only occasionally with mixed species flocks. It generally forages from the mid-canopy upwards, though it moves lower at forest edges and in scrub.

== Conservation status and threats ==
The International Union for Conservation of Nature rates the Trinidad euphonia as being a species of least concern, due to its very large range and apparently stable population. Although its numbers have not been quantified, it is considered to be common across much of its range. However, it is rare and local on Trinidad, where trapping for the caged bird trade has greatly reduced its numbers. Captured birds seldom live long, as most owners do not have sufficient knowledge of the birds' dietary and hygiene needs to keep them successfully.
