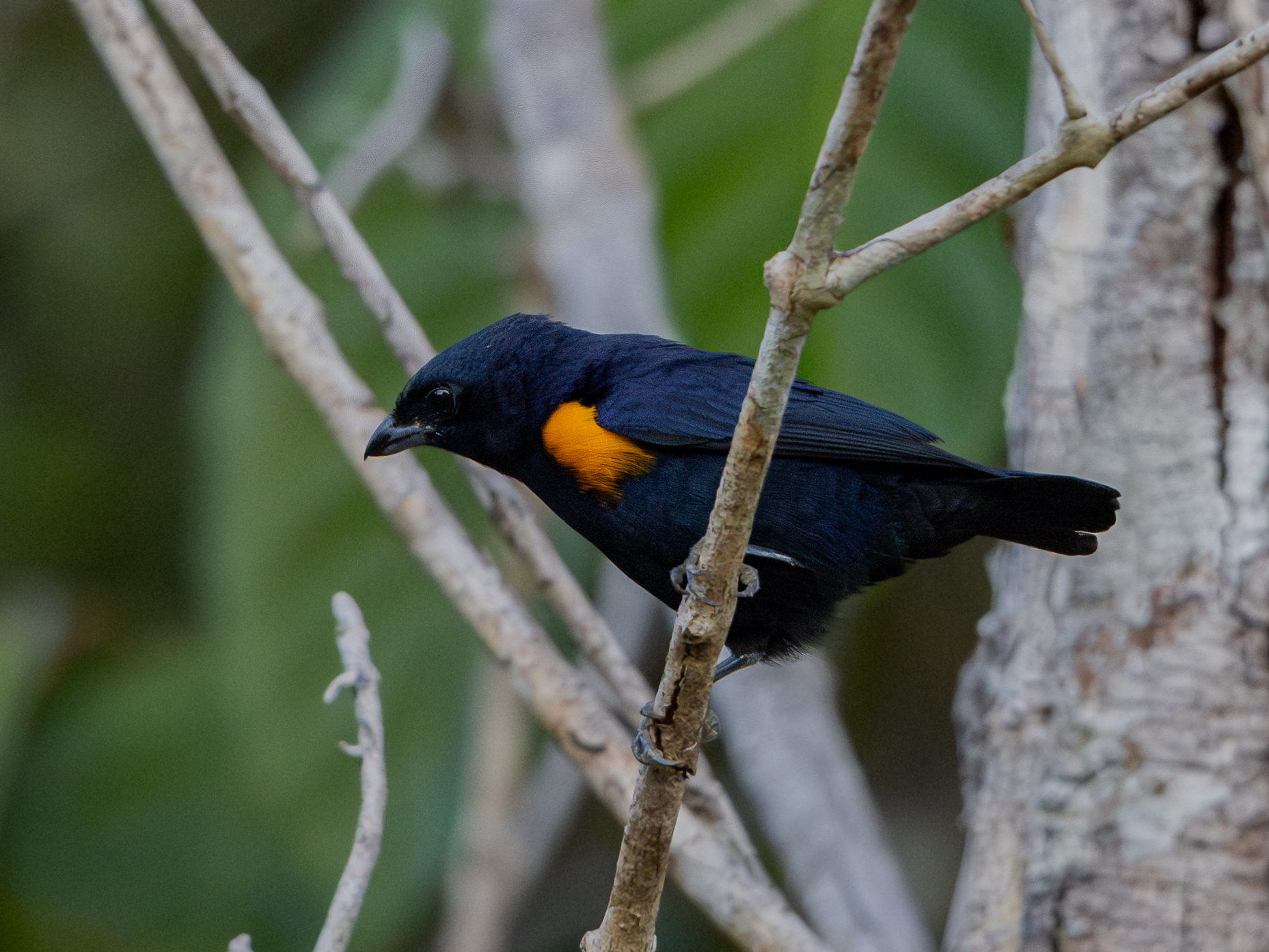
- Male
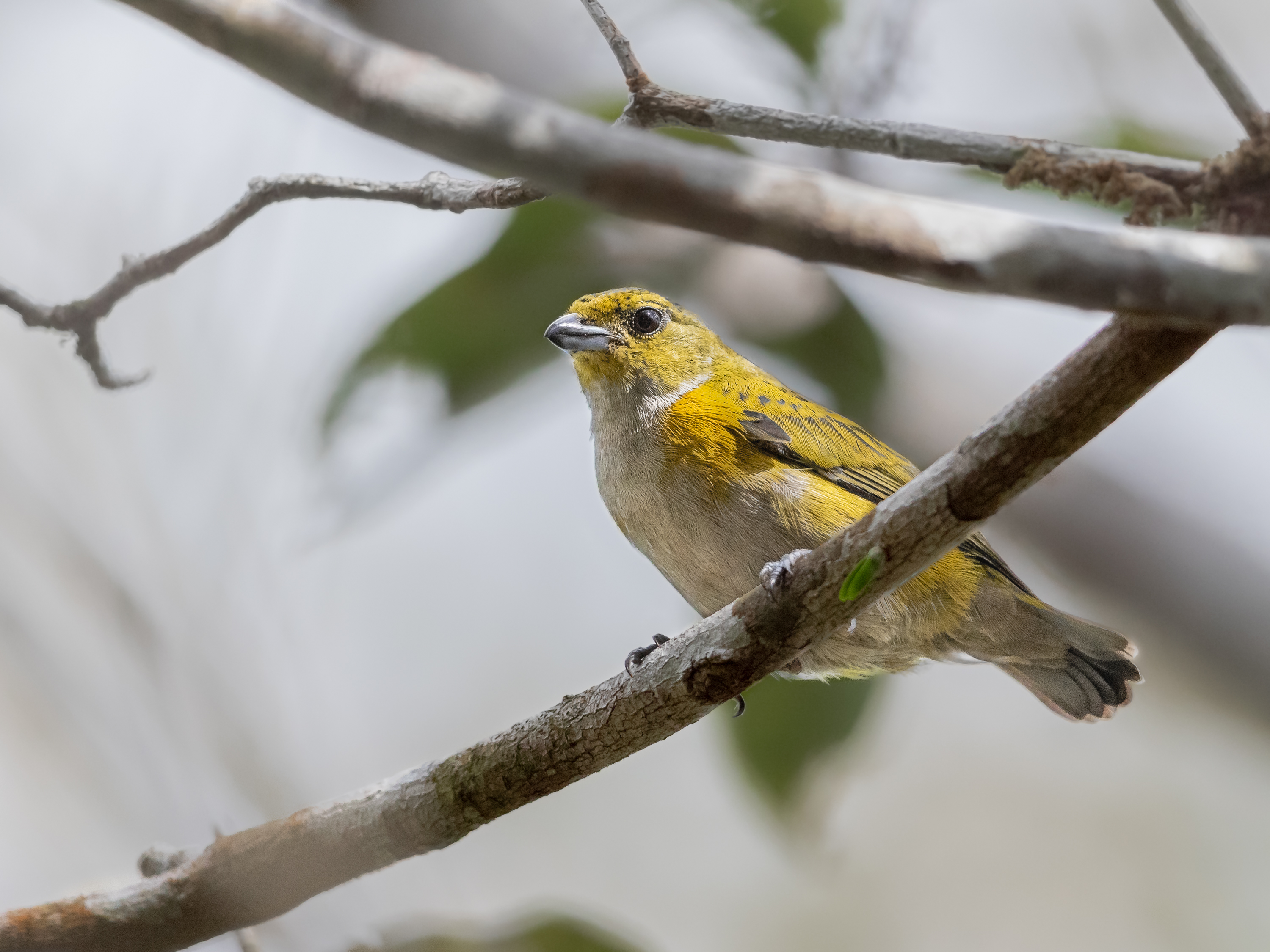
- Female

Conservation status
- Least Concern (IUCN 3.1)

Scientific classification
- Kingdom: Animalia
- Phylum: Chordata
- Class: Aves
- Order: Passeriformes
- Family: Fringillidae
- Subfamily: Euphoniinae
- Genus: Euphonia
- Species: E. cayennensis

Binomial name
- Euphonia cayennensis (Gmelin, JF, 1789)

= Golden-sided euphonia =

Species of bird

The golden-sided euphonia (Euphonia cayennensis) is a species of bird in the family Fringillidae, the finches and euphonias. It is found in northern Brazil, French Guiana, Guyana, Suriname and eastern Venezuela.

== Taxonomy and systematics ==
The golden-sided euphonia was formally described in 1789 by the German naturalist Johann Friedrich Gmelin in his revised and expanded edition of Carl Linnaeus's Systema Naturae. He placed it in the genus Tanagra and coined the binomial name Tanagra cayennensis. (Note: Tanagra is Carl Linnaeus's amended name for Mathurin Brisson's genus Tangara.) Gmelin's account was based on "Le tangara noir de Cayenne" that had been described in 1760 by the French ornithologist Mathurin Brisson from a specimen that had been collected in French Guiana. The golden-sided euphonia is now placed in the genus Euphonia that was introduced in 1806 by the French zoologist Anselme Desmarest. At the time, the genus Euphonia was a member of the family Thraupidae, the "true" tanagers. Multiple studies in the late twentieth and early twenty-first centuries resulted in Euphonia being reassigned to its present place in the family Fringillidae.

The golden-sided euphonia is monotypic.

== Description ==
The golden-sided euphonia is about 11 cm (4.3 in) long and weighs about 12 to 16 g (0.42 to 0.56 oz). It is a smallish euphonia with a stout bill. The species is sexually dimorphic. Adult males are almost entirely dark glossy steel-blue. Their flight feathers and tail are dusky with a steel-blue tinge and steel-blue feather edges. A patch of elongated golden-yellow pectoral feathers that protrude in front of the wing give the species its English name. Adult females have a yellowish forehead and face, an olive crown and nape, and olive upperparts, wings, and tail. Their sides and flanks are olive-yellow and the rest of their underparts are gray. Both sexes have a dark brown iris, a blackish maxilla with a blue-gray base, a blue-gray mandible with a blackish tip, and dark gray legs and feet.

== Distribution and habitat ==
The golden-sided euphonia is found from northeastern Bolívar state in eastern Venezuela east across the Guianas to the Atlantic and across northern Brazil from the Negro River east along both sides of the Amazon to the Atlantic in Pará and northern Maranhão. It inhabits the canopy and edges of humid evergreen forest, secondary forest, and also drier patches of scrub and woodlands in savanna. In elevation it reaches 1,100 m (3,600 ft) in Venezuela and 600 m (2,000 ft) in Brazil.

== Behavior ==
=== Movement ===
The golden-sided euphonia is a year-round resident.

=== Feeding ===
The golden-sided euphonia feeds primarily on small fruits, and also includes smaller amounts of insects in its diet. It mostly forages singly and in pairs, less frequently in small groups, and sometimes joins mixed-species feeding flocks. It twitches or wags its tail while foraging. In the forest it forages primarily in the canopy but often down to the shrub layer in clearings and on edges.

=== Breeding ===
The golden-sided euphonia's breeding season has not been defined but includes November in Brazil. Its nest is a ball with a side entrance made from moss and root fibers lined with finer plant fibers. The clutch is three to five eggs that are whitish with sparse red spots; only the female has been observed incubating. The incubation period, time to fledging, and other details of parental care are not known.

=== Vocalization ===
The golden-sided euphonia's call is "a low, harsh, and gravelly j’a’a’a’a repeated 2–6 times, sometimes quickly. [It also] gives [a] longer, faster, and buzzy rattle, bjjjjjjjjjjjjjjjjjjj, c. 2 seconds, and [a] nasal ruee-e-et". Observers have also reported a duet of short flat whistles and other notes.

== Status ==
The IUCN has assessed the golden-sided euphonia as being of Least Concern. It has a large range; its population size is not known and is believed to be decreasing. No immediate threats have been identified. However, it has been reported in the pet trade at a low level. Its distribution in Venezuela is spotty and there are few records there. It is considered "frequent to uncommon" in Brazil. It occurs in several large protected areas and "the species’ range includes large amounts of intact unprotected forest that is at little immediate risk".
