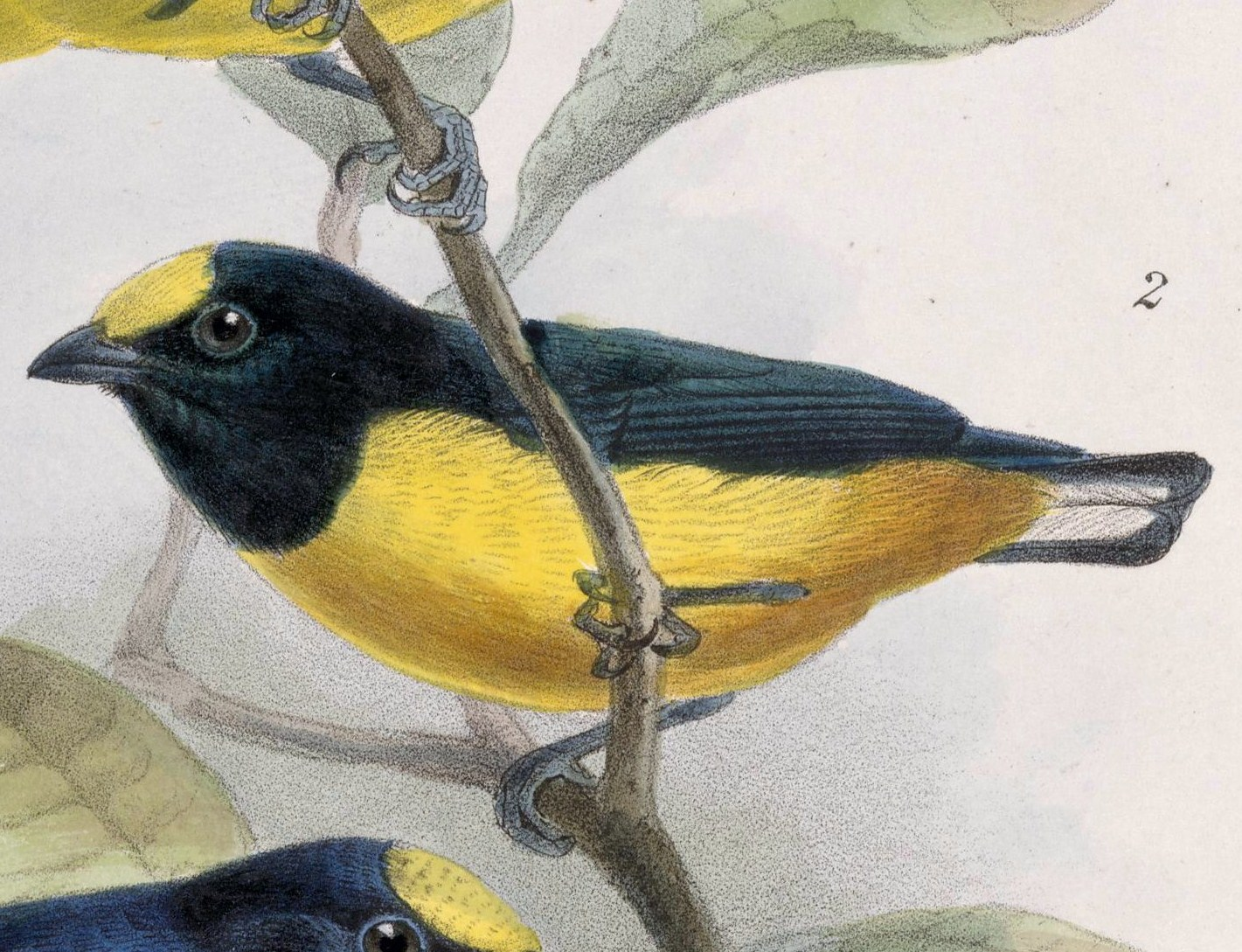

Conservation status
- Least Concern (IUCN 3.1)

Scientific classification
- Kingdom: Animalia
- Phylum: Chordata
- Class: Aves
- Order: Passeriformes
- Family: Fringillidae
- Subfamily: Euphoniinae
- Genus: Euphonia
- Species: E. fulvicrissa

Binomial name
- Euphonia fulvicrissa P.L. Sclater, 1857

= Fulvous-vented euphonia =

Species of bird

The fulvous-vented euphonia (Euphonia fulvicrissa) is a species of bird in the family Fringillidae, the finches and euphonias. It is found in Colombia, Ecuador, and Panama.

== Taxonomy and systematics ==
The fulvous-vented euphonia was originally described in 1857 with its current binomial Euphonia fulvicrissa. At the time, the genus Euphonia was a member of the family Thraupidae, the "true" tanagers. Multiple studies in the late twentieth and early twenty-first centuries resulted in Euphonia being reassigned to its present place in the family Fringillidae.

The fulvous-vented euphonia has three subspecies, the nominate E. f. fulvicrissa (P.L. Sclater, 1857), E. f. omissa (Hartert, EJO, 1913), and E. f. purpurascens (Hartert, 1901).

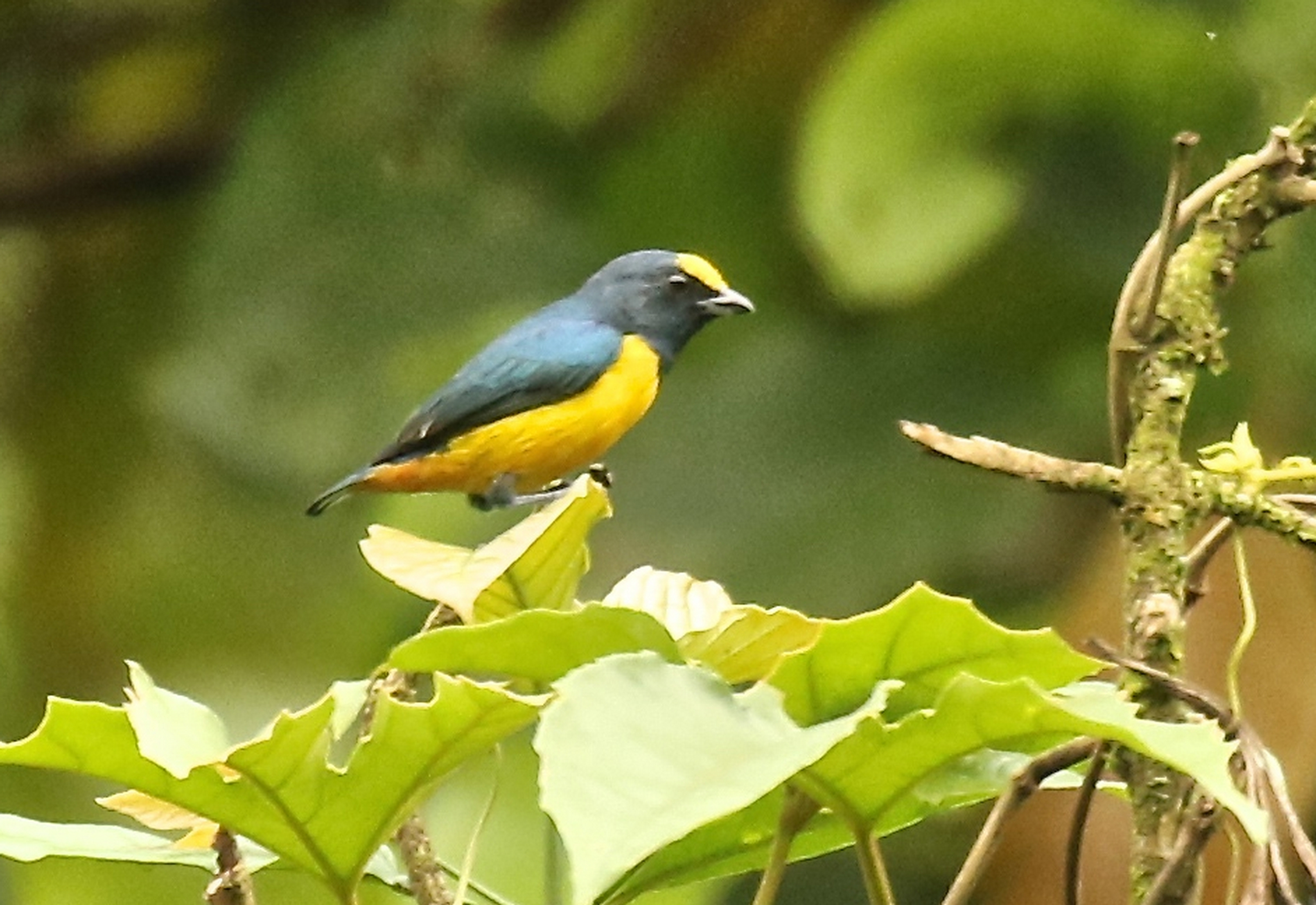
Jordanal - El Valle, Panama

== Description ==
The fulvous-vented euphonia is 9 to 10 cm (3.5 to 3.9 in) long and weighs about 10 to 13 g (0.35 to 0.46 oz). It is a small euphonia. The species is sexually dimorphic. Adult males of the nominate subspecies have a small lemon-yellow forehead; the patch extends to just above the eye. The rest of their crown and their face, nape, throat, chest, and upperparts are glossy blue-black. Their flight feathers are dusky with a blue-black tinge. The upper side of their tail is blue-black and the underside dark gray with white inner webs on the outer two pairs of feathers. Their breast, sides, and flanks are golden-yellow, their belly cinnamon-yellow, and their vent and undertail coverts yellowish cinnamon. Adult females have a small rufous forehead. Their crown, nape, and upper back are bronzy olive-green with a faint grayish gloss. Their lower back, rump, uppertail coverts, and tail are yellowish olive. Their flight feathers are dusky with olive-yellow edges. The center of their belly and undertail coverts are tawny-rufous and the rest of their underparts are olive-yellow that is brightest on the sides. Males of subspecies E. f. omissa have less white on the underside of their tail than the nominate. E. f. purpurascens males have a purplish gloss on their upperparts and upper side of the tail, and no white on the undertail. Both sexes of all subspecies have a dark brown iris, a dusky blackish bill with a blue-gray base to the mandible, and dark gray legs and feet.

== Distribution and habitat ==
The nominate subspecies of the fulvous-vented euphonia is the northernmost of the three. It is found in Panama on the Caribbean slope from Colón Province and the Pacific slope from Panamá Province and from there south into western Colombia's Chocó Department. Subspecies E. f. omissa is found in Colombia at the northern end of the Andes, in the valleys of the Sinú, Cauca, and Magdalena rivers, and south on the Pacific slope of the Andes to Cauca Department. E. f. purpurascens has the smallest range; it is found from southwestern Colombia's Nariño Department south into northwestern Ecuador through Esmeraldas and western Pichincha provinces into northern Manabí Province.

The fulvous-vented euphonia primarily inhabits the interior, edges, and clearings of tropical evergreen forest and secondary forest. In elevation it ranges from sea level to about 900 m (3,000 ft) in Panama, to 900 m (3,000 ft) in Coloimbia, and to 500 m (1,600 ft) in Ecuador.

== Behavior ==
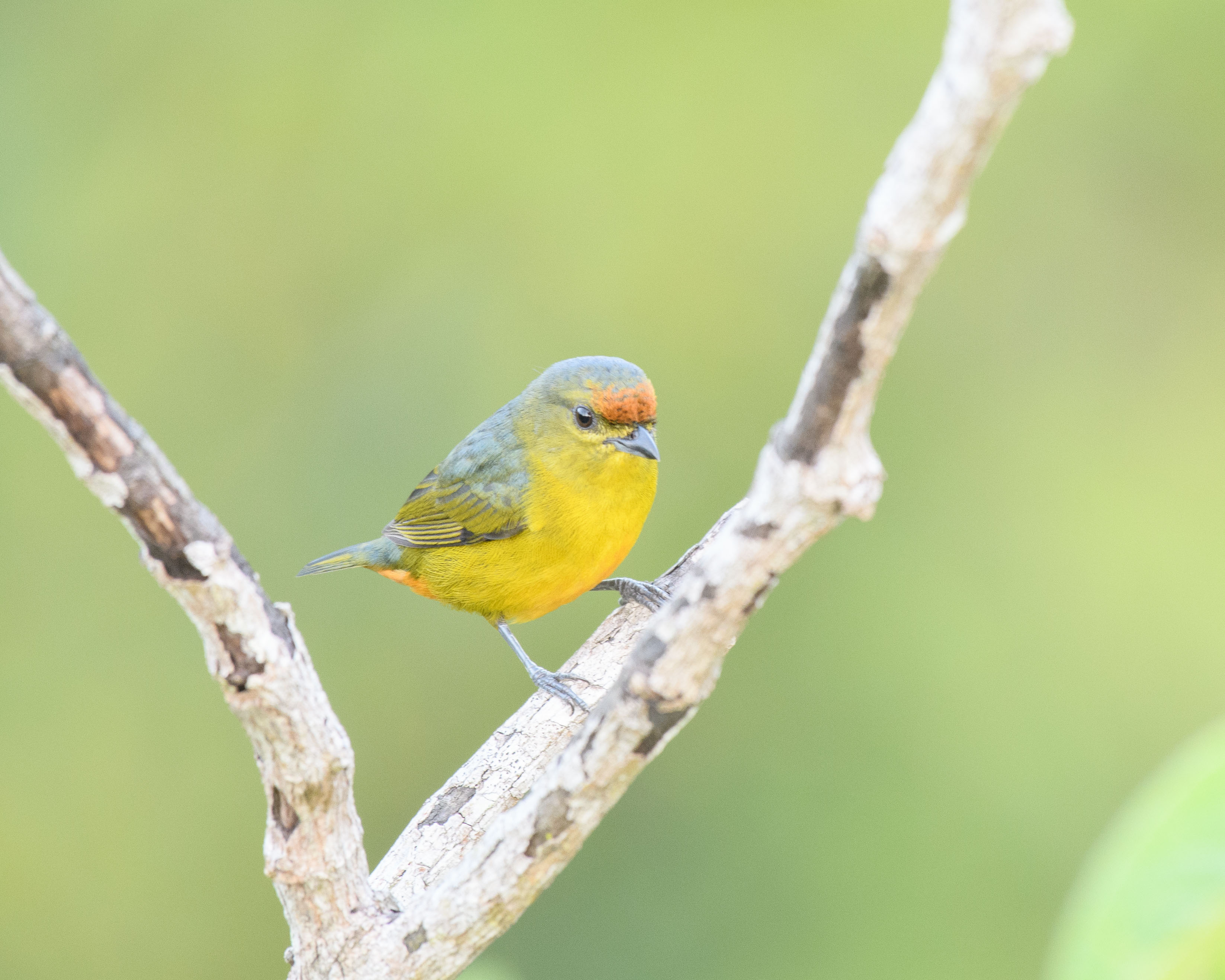
Female fulvous-vented euphonia

=== Movement ===
The fulvous-vented euphonia is a year-round resident, though some elevational movements are suspected.

=== Feeding ===
The fulvous-vented euphonia feeds primarily on small fruits, and also includes smaller amounts of arthropods in its diet. It mostly forages singly, in pairs, and in small groups, and regularly associates with mixed-species feeding flocks. In the forest it forages primarily from the mid-level to the canopy but often down to the shrub layer in clearings and on edges.

=== Breeding ===
The fulvous-vented euphonia breeds between January and July in Colombia; its breeding season elsewhere is not known. Both sexes build the nest, a ball with a side entrance made from plant fibers. One was found in a thick mass of moss hanging in a tree about 12 m (40 ft) above the ground. The clutch size, incubation period, time to fledging, and details of parental care are not known.

=== Vocalization ===
The fulvous-vented euphonia's song is "1–3 soft, chattery rattles followed by 1–2 short, complex and squeaky phrases that rise in pitch, e.g. du, d’u’u’u-d’u’u’u spze’e’t’tic, spze’e’t’tic...du’u, d’u’u’u-d’u’u’u’ spze’e’t’tic... and so on". Its calls include "a chattery rattle, d’e’e’e’h, d’e’e’e’h occasionally a single d’e’e’e’h or up to three rattles in a row", "a rising whistle, wheet", and a "doubled wheet-wheet".

== Status ==
The IUCN has assessed the fulvous-vented euphonia as being of Least Concern. It has a large range; its estimated population of at least 500,000 mature individuals is believed to be decreasing. No immediate threats have been identified. It is considered fairly common in Colombia. It occurs in many protected areas and also "in a variety of second-growth and forest-edge habitats, much of which, though unprotected, is likely to persist at least for the short term, despite ongoing forest clearance".
