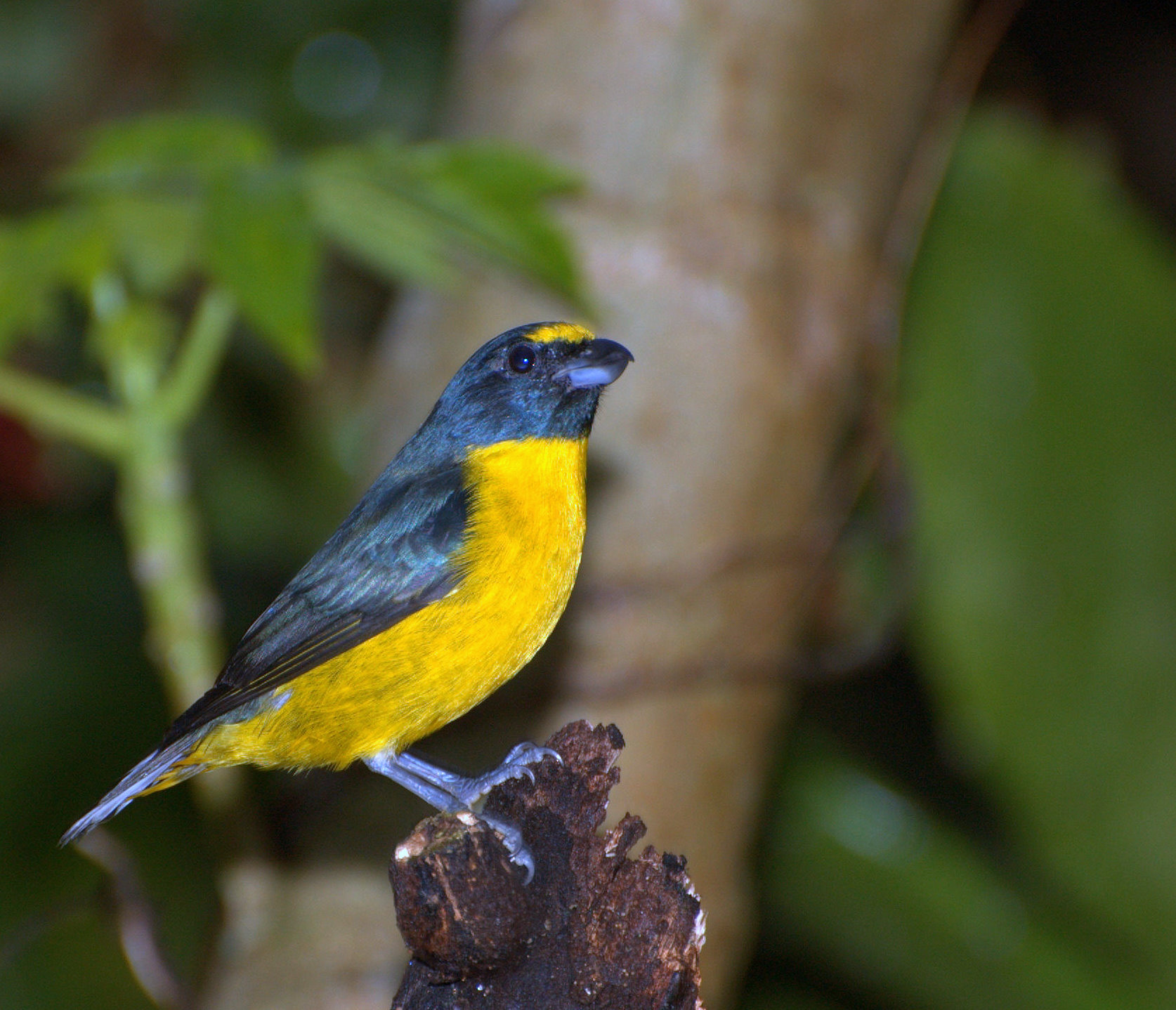
- Male in São Paulo, Brazil
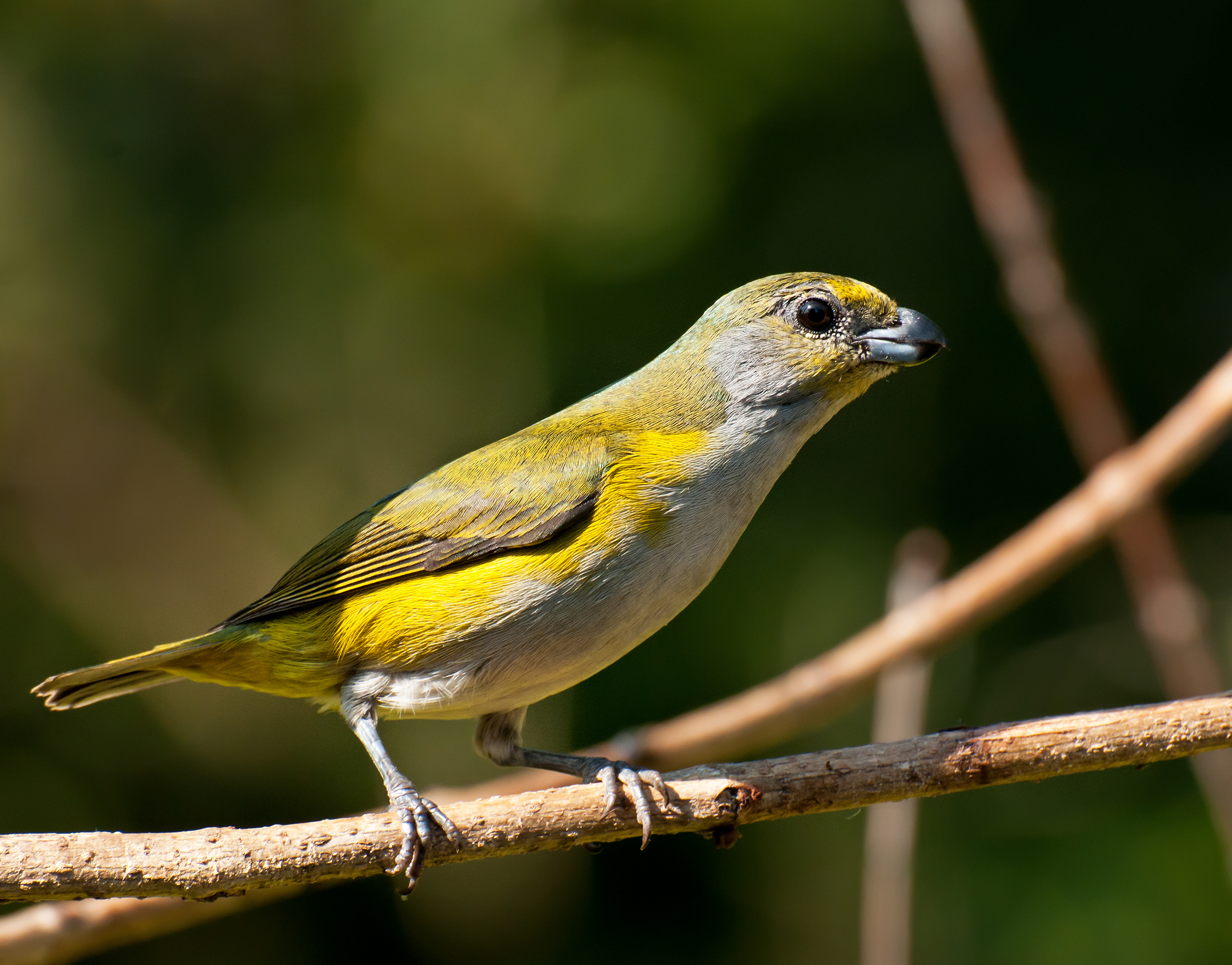
- Female in São Paulo, Brazil

Conservation status
- Least Concern (IUCN 3.1)

Scientific classification
- Kingdom: Animalia
- Phylum: Chordata
- Class: Aves
- Order: Passeriformes
- Family: Fringillidae
- Subfamily: Euphoniinae
- Genus: Euphonia
- Species: E. chalybea

Binomial name
- Euphonia chalybea (Mikan, 1825)

= Green-chinned euphonia =

Species of bird

The green-chinned euphonia or green-throated euphonia (Euphonia chalybea) is a species of bird in the family Fringillidae, the finches and euphonias. It is found in Argentina, Brazil, and Paraguay.

== Taxonomy and systematics ==
The green-chinned euphonia was originally described in 1825 with the binomial Tanagra chalybea. The genus Tanagra (Tangara) is a member of the family Thraupidae, the "true" tanagers, where the species remained after being reassigned to genus Euphonia. Multiple studies in the late twentieth and early twenty-first centuries resulted in Euphonia being reassigned to its present place in the family Fringillidae.

The green-chinned euphonia is also known as the green-throated euphonia. It is monotypic.

== Description ==
The green-chinned euphonia is about 10 cm (3.9 in) long and weighs 18 to 20 g (0.63 to 0.71 oz). It is a large euphonia with a short thick bill. The species is sexually dimorphic. Adult males have a small bright yellow forehead patch and blackish lores. The rest of their head, their neck, and their upperparts are glossy dark greenish blue. Their flight feathers are mostly dusky with dark greenish blue edges on the secondaries and tertials. Their tail's upper side is dark greenish blue and its underside is dark dusky gray. Their chin and upper throat are glossy dark greenish blue and their lower throat to their undertail coverts are bright yellow. Adult females have an olive crown, nape, upperparts, wings, and tail. Their face, sides of their neck, and most of their underparts are pale gray. Their chin, sides, flanks, and undertail coverts are olive-yellow. Both sexes have a dark brown iris, a bluish gray bill with a blackish tip, and dark gray legs and feet.

== Distribution and habitat ==
The green-chinned euphonia is found from Rio de Janeiro and far southern Minas Gerais states in southeastern Brazil south to central Rio Grande do Sul. From there its range extends west into eastern Paraguay between Canindeyú and Itapúa departments and into northeastern Argentina's Misiones and Corrientes provinces. The species is a bird of the Atlantic Forest. It inhabits humid forest where it favors the edges and clearings with trees and also mature secondary forest. Overall in elevation it ranges from sea level to 900 m (3,000 ft) but reaches only 500 m (1,600 ft) in Brazil.

== Behavior ==
=== Movement ===
The green-chinned euphonia is a year-round resident.

=== Feeding ===
The green-chinned euphonia feeds primarily on fruits but also includes spiders and adult and larval insects in its diet. It appears to favor the fruits of epiphytes including those of arboreal cacti. It typically forages in pairs or in small flocks of the same species, and usually high in trees. It also shares fruiting trees with other birds and regularly joins mixed-species feeding flocks.

=== Breeding ===
The green-chinned euphonia's breeding season includes October but is otherwise not defined. Its nest is a ball of plant stems and leaves with a side entrance. Two nests were placed in clusters of epiphytes, one of them about 15 m (50 ft) up in a tree and the other in a tree near a house. Specimens thought to be its eggs were yellowish with red-brown spots. The clutch size, incubation period, time to fledging, and details of parental care are not known.

=== Vocalization ===
The green-chinned euphonia's song is a "short, simple warble with partly inhaled tif notes" and its call a "mid-high, dry, rapid ditditditdit".

== Status ==
The IUCN originally in 1988 assessed the green-chinned euphonia as Threatened, then in 1994 as Near Threatened, and since February 2024 as being of Least Concern. Its population size is not known and is believed to be decreasing. "The major threat to this species is the loss and degradation of Atlantic forest, driven by urbanisation, industrialisation, agricultural expansion and road-building. However, the species also occupies forest edges and secondary growth and can tolerate a certain level of disturbance." It is considered "frequent to uncommon" in Brazil. It occurs in protected areas in Brazil and Argentina.
