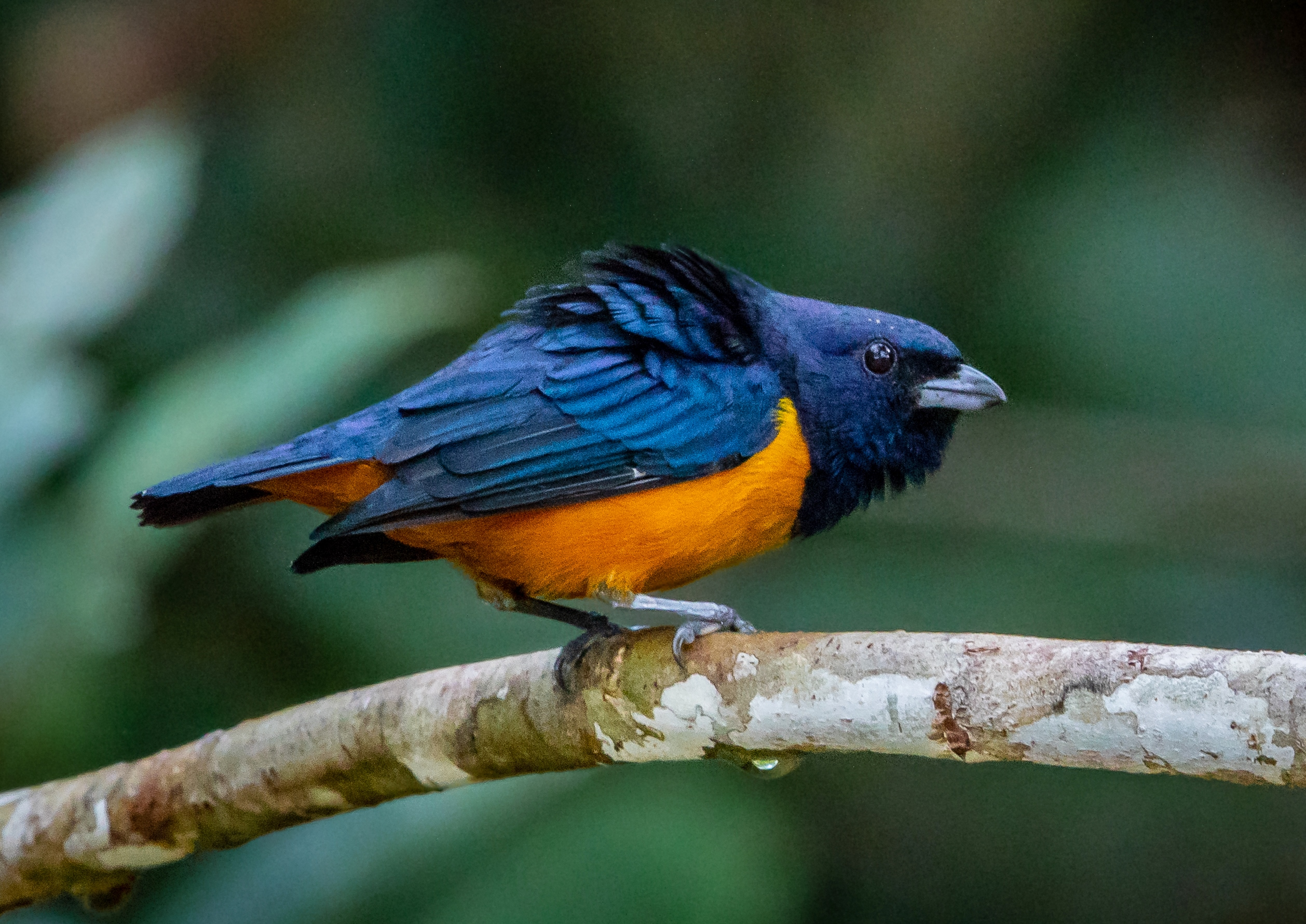
- Male, Amazonas state, Brazil
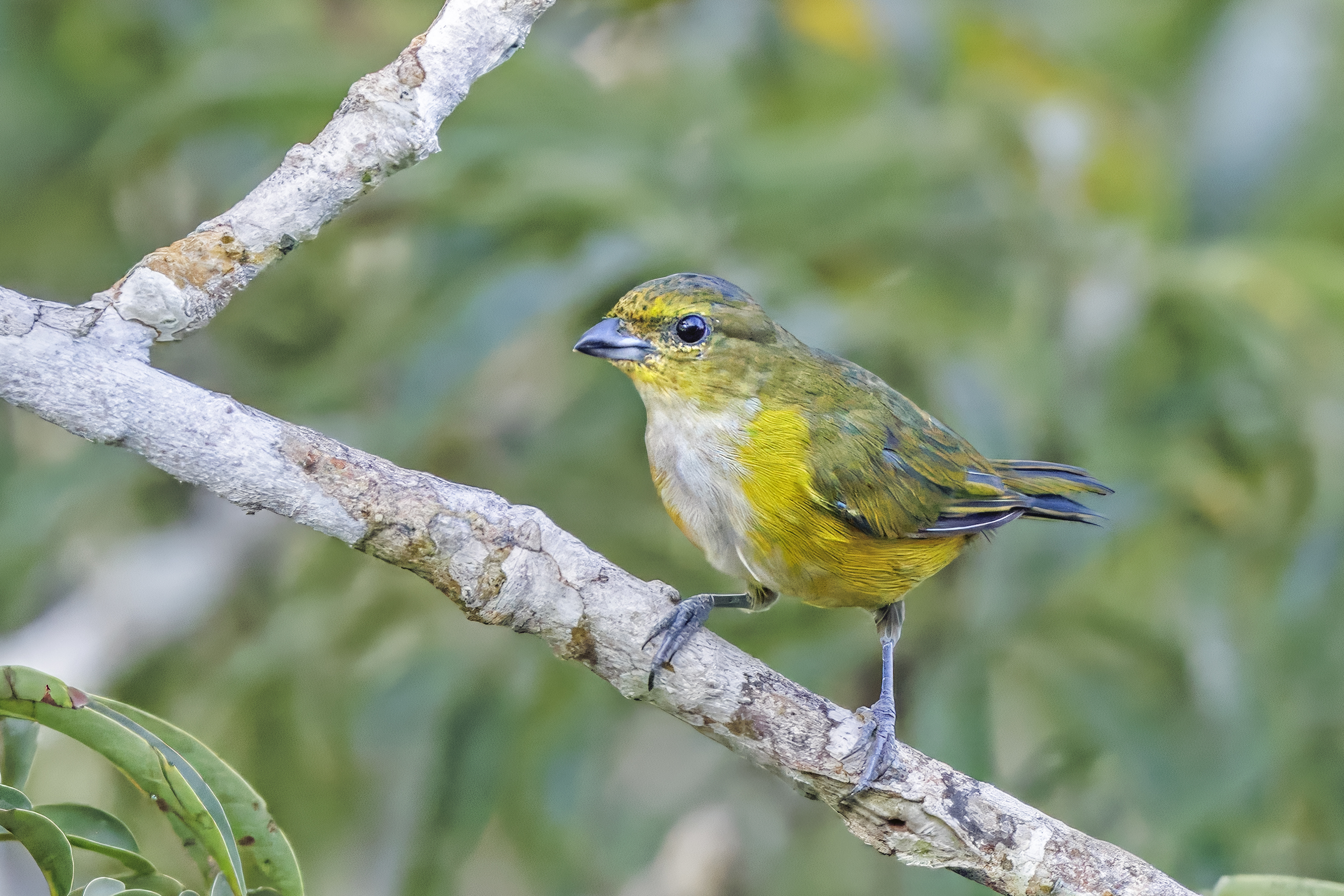
- Female, Ecuador

Conservation status
- Least Concern (IUCN 3.1)

Scientific classification
- Kingdom: Animalia
- Phylum: Chordata
- Class: Aves
- Order: Passeriformes
- Family: Fringillidae
- Subfamily: Euphoniinae
- Genus: Euphonia
- Species: E. rufiventris

Binomial name
- Euphonia rufiventris (Vieillot, 1819)

= Rufous-bellied euphonia =

Species of bird

The rufous-bellied euphonia (Euphonia rufiventris) is a species of bird in the family Fringillidae, the finches and euphonias. It is found in Bolivia, Brazil, Colombia, Ecuador, Peru, and Venezuela.

== Taxonomy and systematics ==
The rufous-bellied euphonia was formally described in 1819 with the binomial Tanagra rufiventris. (Note: Tanagra is Carl Linnaeus's amended name for Mathurin Brisson's genus Tangara.) The species was eventually reassigned to genus Euphonia. At the time, the genus Euphonia was a member of the family Thraupidae, the "true" tanagers. Multiple studies in the late twentieth and early twenty-first centuries resulted in Euphonia being reassigned to its present place in the family Fringillidae.

The rufous-bellied euphonia's further taxonomy is unsettled. The IOC, AviList, and BirdLife International's Handbook of the Birds of the World assign it two subspecies, the nominate E. r. rufiventris (Vieillot, 1819) and E. r. carnegiei (Dickerman, 1988). However, as of late 2025, the Clements taxonomy does not recognize E. r. carnegiei and so treats the species as monotypic.

This article follows the two-subspecies model.

== Description ==
The rufous-bellied euphonia is about 10 cm (3.9 in) long and weighs 13 to 18 g (0.46 to 0.63 oz). It is a smallish euphonia with a stout bill. The species is sexually dimorphic. Adult males of the nominate subspecies have a dark steel-blue head, throat, chest, and upperparts. Their flight feathers and tail are dusky with a steel-blue tinge and steel-blue feather edges. They have a patch of golden-yellow pectoral feathers that is usually hidden under the wing. Their underparts below the chest are mostly orange that is somewhat golden-yellow on the sides. Adult females have a mostly darkish olive head with a yellowish tinge on the forehead, a grayish tinge on the nape, a yellowish chin, and a gray throat. Their upperparts, wings, and tail are darkish olive. Their underparts are mostly gray with olive-yellow sides and flanks and tawny undertail coverts. Males of subspecies E. r. carnegiei have darker blue upperparts and darker tawny lower underparts than the nominate. Females are overall darker than the nominate with more olive sides and flanks. They also often have a weak metallic blue gloss on the upperparts. Both sexes of both subspecies have a dark brown iris, a pale blue-gray bill with a black tip to the mandible, and dark gray legs and feet.

== Distribution and habitat ==
The rufous-bellied euphonia is a bird of the western and central Amazon Basin. Subspecies E. r. carnegiei is the more northerly of the two and has the smaller range. It is found from most of Amazonas and Bolívar states in Venezuela south into northern Brazil in the watersheds of the Vaupés and Negro rivers. The nominate subspecies is found from the southeastern third of Colombia south through eastern Ecuador and eastern Peru into northern Bolivia and from there east across much of Amazonian Brazil south of the Amazon River. In Brazil its eastern boundary is roughly a line from east-central Pará southwest to southern Mato Grosso.

The rufous-bellied euphonia primarily inhabits humid to wet várzea and terra firme forest. It regularly occurs at the forest's edges and in mature secondary forest and less frequently in clearings with tall trees. In elevation it reaches 800 m (2,600 ft) in Colombia, 500 m (1,600 ft) in Ecuador, 1,000 m (3,300 ft) in Peru, and 1,100 m (3,600 ft) in Venezuela and Brazil.

== Behavior ==
=== Movement ===
The rufous-bellied euphonia is a year-round resident.

=== Feeding ===
The rufous-bellied euphonia feeds primarily on small fruits and berries, and also includes smaller amounts of insects in its diet. It mostly forages singly and in pairs and seldom in small groups, but regularly joins mixed-species feeding flocks. It twitches its tail while foraging. In the forest it forages primarily in the subcanopy and canopy, where it often forages in epiphytes, especially bromeliads.

=== Breeding ===
Nothing is known about the rufous-bellied euphonia's breeding biology.

=== Vocalization ===
The rufous-bellied euphonia's song is described as "a disjointed, mechanical series of pure whistles, quiet liquid sounds, and short warbles, with various phrases given before any is repeated". Its calls include "a rapid, deep, ringing chatter: tcheetcheetcheetchee and a liquid whit".

== Status ==
The IUCN has assessed the rufous-bellied euphonia as being of Least Concern. It has a very large range; its population size is not known but is believed to be stable. No immediate threats have been identified. It is considered common in Colombia, fairly common in Peru, and "common to frequent" in Brazil. It "[o]ccurs in numerous protected areas, and its range encompasses extensive intact forest habitat that, while unprotected, faces little or no threats in the short term".
