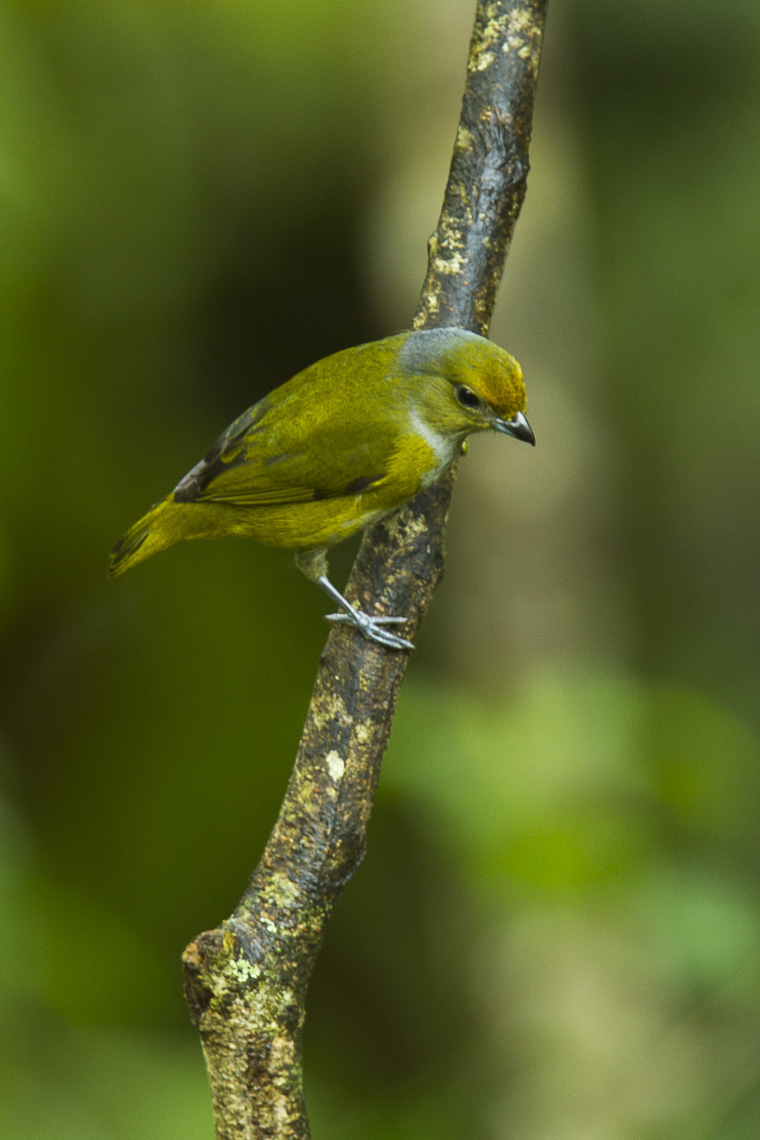
- in Ecuador

Conservation status
- Least Concern (IUCN 3.1)

Scientific classification
- Kingdom: Animalia
- Phylum: Chordata
- Class: Aves
- Order: Passeriformes
- Family: Fringillidae
- Subfamily: Euphoniinae
- Genus: Euphonia
- Species: E. mesochrysa

Binomial name
- Euphonia mesochrysa Salvadori, 1873

= Bronze-green euphonia =

Species of bird

The bronze-green euphonia (Euphonia mesochrysa) is a species of bird in the family Fringillidae, the finches and euphonias. It is found in Bolivia, Colombia, Ecuador, and Peru.

== Taxonomy and systematics ==
The bronze-green euphonia was originally described in 1873 with its current binomial Euphonia mesochrysa. At the time, the genus Euphonia was a member of the family Thraupidae, the "true" tanagers. Multiple studies in the late twentieth and early twenty-first centuries resulted in Euphonia being reassigned to its present place in the family Fringillidae.

The bronze-green euphonia has three subspecies, the nominate E. m. mesochrysa (Salvadori, 1873), E. m. media (Zimmer, JT, 1943), and E. m. tavarae (Chapman, 1925).

== Description ==
The bronze-green euphonia is 9 to 10 cm (3.5 to 3.9 in) long and weighs 12 to 15 g (0.42 to 0.53 oz). It is a rather drab euphonia with a thick stubby bill. The species is sexually dimorphic. Adult males of the nominate subspecies have a bright yellow forehead with a thin dark olive band below it. Their mid-crown is olive, their rear crown grayish, and their nape and the rest of their face olive. Their upperparts are olive with a strong gray-blue gloss. Their upperwing coverts are olive-green and their primary coverts blackish. Their flight feathers are dusky with yellow-green edges on the outer ones and olive-green edges on the rest. The upper side of their tail is dusky olive and the underside dark gray. Their throat, chest, and sides are yellowish olive and the rest of their underparts deep ochre-yellow. Adult females have an olive forecrown and mid-crown, and a strongly gray-tinged hindcrown and nape. The rest of their face is olive. Their upperparts, wings, and tail are like the male's. Their throat, chest, and upper breast are olive-yellow, the center of their lower breast and their belly light gray, and their sides, flanks, and undertail coverts olive-yellow. Males of subspecies E. m. media are everywhere darker than the nominate, with a wider yellow forehead and more yellow on the underparts. Females are also darker than the nominate. E. m. tavarae males have a slightly paler forehead than the nominate, with a wider dark band below it, a darker and more olive throat, and a less orange-tinted belly. Both sexes of all subspecies have a dark brown iris, a blackish maxilla, a mostly bluish gray mandible, and dark gray legs and feet.

== Distribution and habitat ==
The subspecies of the bronze-green euphonia are found thus:

- E. m. mesochrysa: northern Colombia at the head of the Magdalena River valley; along the eastern slope of the Eastern Andes in Colombia and along the Andes of eastern Ecuador almost to the Peruvian border
- E. m. media eastern slope of the northern and central Peruvian Andes from Amazonas and Cajamarca departments south to the Chanchamayo River in Junín Department
- E. m. tavarae: eastern Andean slope from Cuzco Department in southeastern Peru into Bolivia to far western Santa Cruz Department

The bronze-green euphonia inhabits humid to wet subtropical montane cloudforest. It prefers forest on steep hillsides and often occurs along its margins, in clearings, in landslide scars, and along roads. In elevation it ranges between 500 and 2,300 m (1,600 and 7,500 ft) in Colombia and mostly between 1,100 and 1,800 m (3,600 and 5,900 ft) in Ecuador. In most of Peru it ranges between 1,000 and 2,000 m (3,300 and 6,600 ft) but occurs locally down to 450 m (1,500 ft) in Puno Department.

== Behavior ==
=== Movement ===
The bronze-green euphonia is a year-round resident, though some elevational movements are suspected.

=== Feeding ===
The bronze-green euphonia feeds on small fruits and berries, and probably also includes small amounts of insects in its diet. It regularly joins mixed-species feeding flocks and also shares fruiting trees with other species. It tends to feed mostly in shrubs and small trees.

=== Breeding ===
Nothing is known about the bronze-green euphonia's breeding biology.

=== Vocalization ===
One description of the bronze-green euphonia's song is "2 clear notes followed by a musical trill, tee-teeu-trrrrrt". Another is "usually a whistled note followed by one or more ringing rattles, for example peew brrrrrrr brr brr". Its call is "a distinctive, gravelly treeuh, treeuh".

== Status ==
The IUCN has assessed the bronze-green euphonia as being of Least Concern. It has a large range; its population size is not known and is believed to be decreasing. No immediate threats have been identified. It is "inconspicuous and not often encountered" in Ecuador and uncommon in Colombia and Peru. It occurs in at least one protected area in each country of its range. "Although [the eastern] slope of Andes has suffered extensive deforestation, wide areas of unprotected intact habitat remain which unlikely to be at risk in the near term."
