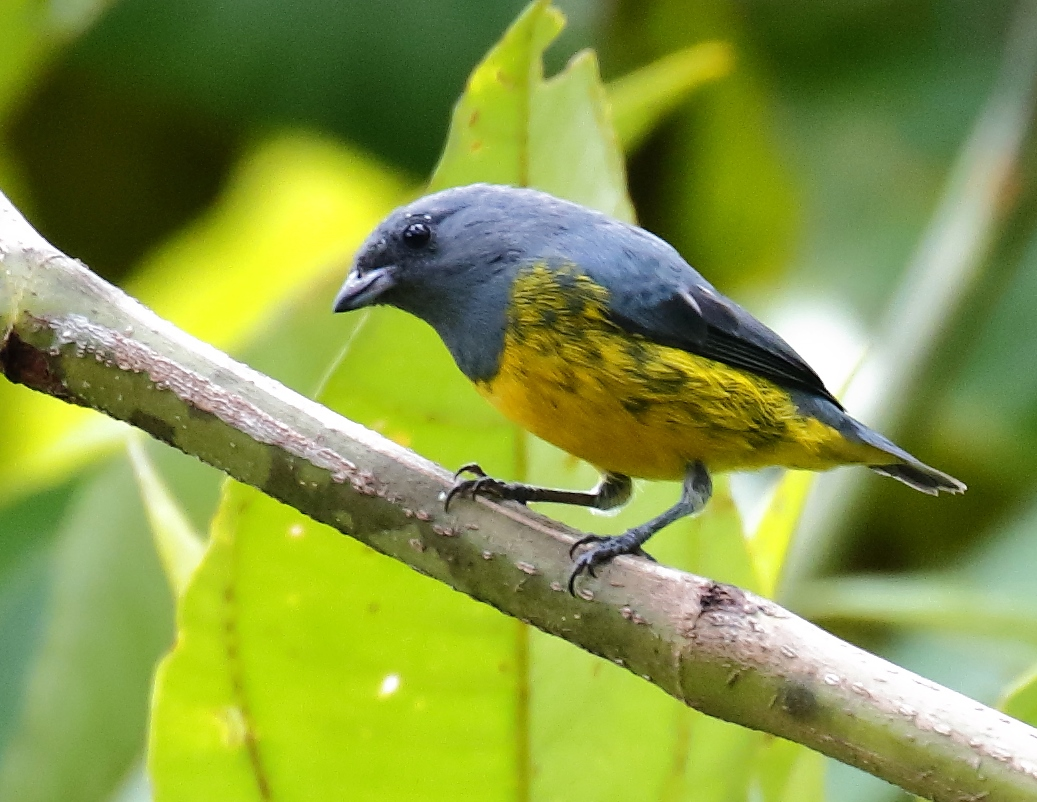

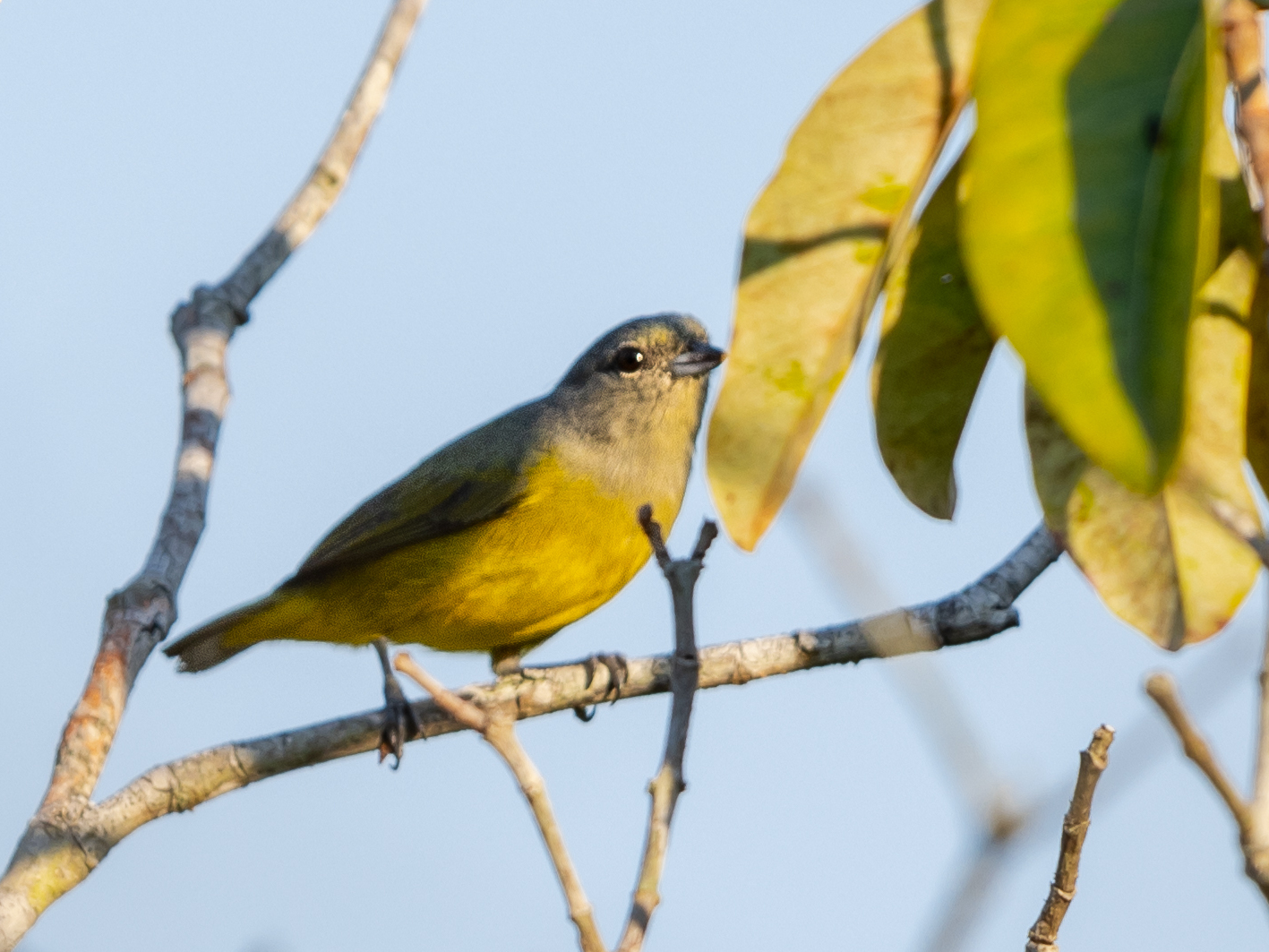
- Male (top) and female (bottom) plumbeous euphonias at Presidente Figueiredo, Amazonas state, Brazil

Conservation status
- Least Concern (IUCN 3.1)

Scientific classification
- Kingdom: Animalia
- Phylum: Chordata
- Class: Aves
- Order: Passeriformes
- Family: Fringillidae
- Subfamily: Euphoniinae
- Genus: Euphonia
- Species: E. plumbea

Binomial name
- Euphonia plumbea Du Bus de Gisignies, 1855

= Plumbeous euphonia =

Species of bird

The plumbeous euphonia (Euphonia plumbea) is a species of bird in the family Fringillidae, the finches and euphonias. It is found in Brazil, Colombia, Guyana, Peru, Suriname, Venezuela, and as a vagrant to French Guiana.

== Taxonomy and systematics ==
The plumbeous euphonia was originally described in 1855 with its current binomial Euphonia plumbea. The genus Euphonia was long placed in the family Thraupidae, the "true" tanagers. Multiple studies in the late twentieth and early twenty-first centuries resulted in its being reassigned to its present place in the family Fringillidae.

The plumbeous euphonia is monotypic.

== Description ==
The plumbeous euphonia is about 9 cm (3.5 in) long and weighs about 9 g (0.32 oz). The species is sexually dimorphic. Adult males have a glossy dark gray head, upper breast, and upperparts. Their tail is dusky with a wash of olivaceous gray. Their upperwing coverts and flight feathers are dusky with wide olivaceous gray edges. Their underparts from their breast to the undertail coverts are bright yellow with some gray mottling on the sides and flanks. Adult females have an overall pattern similar to the male's though duller. Their crown and nape are gray and the rest of their head and their back are yellowish gray. Their rump and uppertail coverts are paler and more yellowish than the back. Their tail, upperwing coverts, and flight feathers are dark olive. Their throat and chest are pale gray with a slight yellow tinge. Their breast and belly are olive-yellow and their undertail coverts pale olive with a yellow wash. Both sexes have a dark brown iris, a blackish bill with a grayish base, and dark gray legs and feet.

== Distribution and habitat ==
The plumbeous euphonia has one large contiguous range and a few isolated populations. The contiguous range is from extreme eastern Colombia east through most of southern Venezuela and Guiana into Suriname and also across far northwestern Brazil. Though some sources include French Guiana in this range, the South American Classification Committee (SACC) treats it as a vagrant in that country. There is a small population in northern Peru's Department of San Martín and possibly another in the Department of Loreto. There are records in several sites in Brazil that are distant from the contiguous range.

The plumbeous euphonia inhabits a variety of somewhat open landscapes such as scrubby open woodlands, scattered trees and bushy areas in savannah, the edges of larger savanna wooded areas, and rock outcrops in scrubby areas. Most of these landscapes are on nutrient-poor white-sand soil. In Colombia it is found below about 200 m (700 ft) of elevation and in Venezuela and Brazil below 1,000 m (3,300 ft).

== Behavior ==
=== Movement ===
Though the plumbeous euphonia is generally a resident species it tends to wander erratically so its occurrence at any give site is unpredictable.

=== Feeding ===
The plumbeous euphonia feeds primarily on small berries and other small fruits. It typically forages in pairs or family groups and usually in the upper parts of trees.

=== Breeding ===
Nothing is known about the plumbeous euphonia's breeding biology.

=== Vocalization ===
The plumbeous euphonia's song is described as "a squeaky, jumbled o'fiddle-de-wEET!" that is sung quickly. Another description is a jumbled "WEET sweeta-swee-swee" that often includes call notes. The species' most common call is "a high, clear dee-dee or dee, dee-dee" whose notes are on one pitch.

== Status ==
The IUCN has assessed the plumbeous euphonia as being of Least Concern. Its population size is not known but is believed to be stable. No immediate threats have been identified. It is considered fairly common in its small Colombian range, "uncommon to locally common" in Venezuela, and "uncommon to rare" in Brazil. It is known in Peru only from a few sight records. In its main range it occurs in several protected areas. "The species’ range also includes extensive intact habitat which is unprotected, but with little short-term risk of development."
