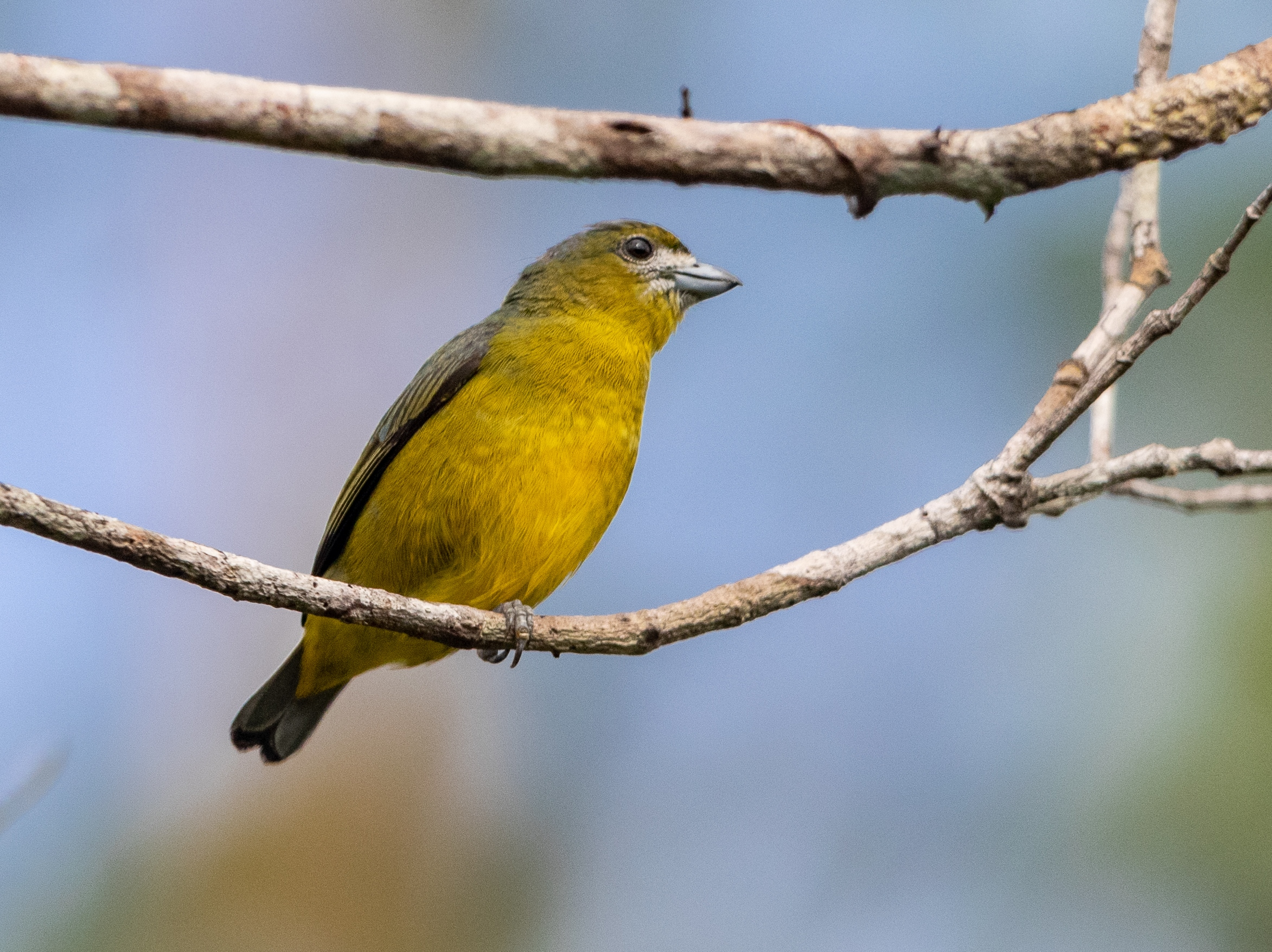
- A male at Presidente Figueiredo, Amazonas, Brazil

Conservation status
- Least Concern (IUCN 3.1)

Scientific classification
- Kingdom: Animalia
- Phylum: Chordata
- Class: Aves
- Order: Passeriformes
- Family: Fringillidae
- Subfamily: Euphoniinae
- Genus: Euphonia
- Species: E. chrysopasta

Binomial name
- Euphonia chrysopasta Sclater, PL & Salvin, 1869

= White-lored euphonia =

Species of bird

The white-lored euphonia or golden-bellied euphonia (Euphonia chrysopasta) is a species of bird in the family Fringillidae, the finches and euphonias. It is found in every mainland South American country except Argentina, Chile, Paraguay, and Uruguay.

== Taxonomy and systematics ==
The white-lored euphonia was originally described in 1869 with its current binomial Euphonia chrysopasta. The genus Euphonia had long placed in the family Thraupidae, the "true" tanagers. Multiple studies in the late twentieth and early twenty-first centuries resulted in its being reassigned to its present place in the family Fringillidae.

The white-lored euphonia has two subspecies, the nominate E. c. chrysopasta (Sclater, PL & Salvin, 1869) and E. c. nitida (Penard, TE, 1923).

== Description ==
The white-lored euphonia is 9 to 10 cm (3.5 to 3.9 in) long and weighs about 11 to 16 g (0.39 to 0.56 oz). It has a thick bill. The species is sexually dimorphic but not dramatically so. Adult males of the nominate subspecies have an olive forecrown with a thin dusky front border and a grayish crown and nape. Their lores, chin, and cheeks are ashy whitish gray and the rest of their face is olive-green. Their upperparts are mostly olive-green with a bluish gray gloss and paler uppertail coverts. The upper side of their tail is olive and the lower side grayish. Their flight feathers are dusky with olive-green edges and tips. Their underparts are mostly yellow with faint olive mottling, a slight olive tinge on the flanks, a clear yellow center of the belly, and clear yellow undertail coverts. Adult females are overall duller than males. They have less white on their face. Their upperparts, wings, and tail are like the male's. Their underparts are mostly gray with olive-yellow sides, flanks, and undertail coverts. Subspecies E. c. nitida is slightly smaller than the nominate. Males have less gray on their crown and nape and slightly duller underparts. Females are like the nominate. Both sexes of both subspecies have a dark brown iris, a blackish bill with a grayish base to the mandible, and horn-gray legs and feet.

== Distribution and habitat ==
The nominate subspecies of the white-lored euphonia is the more westerly and southerly of the two. It is found from southeastern Colombia south through eastern Ecuador and eastern Peru into northern Bolivia and east across Amazonian Brazil south of the Amazon river to the Xingu and Tocantins rivers. Subspecies E. c. nitida is found from extreme eastern Colombia east across Venezuela's Amazonas, Bolívar, and southern Delta Amacuro states. Its range continues to the Atlantic across the Guianas and Brazil north of the Amazon.

The white-lored euphonia inhabits the canopy and edges of humid várzea and terra firme forests and also shady clearings with trees and mature secondary forest. In elevation it reaches 1,200 m (3,900 ft) in Colombia and Peru, 600 m (2,000 ft) in Ecuador, and 900 m (3,000 ft) in Venezuela and Brazil.

== Behavior ==
=== Movement ===
The white-lored euphonia is a resident species.

=== Feeding ===
The white-lored euphonia feeds primarily on the fruits of mistletoe (Loranthaceae) and other small fruits, and also includes small numbers of insects in its diet. It forages mostly in pairs, less often singly or in small groups, and sometimes joins mixed-species feeding flocks. In forest it forages primarily in the canopy but feeds lower in shrubs and small trees at its edges and in clearings.

=== Breeding ===
The white-lored euphonia's breeding season has not been defined but apparently includes August in Ecuador and August and September in Peru. Both sexes build the nest, a football-shaped mass with a side entrance, made from plant materials such as grasses and leaves. It is typically placed in a clump of epiphytes, moss, or ferns on a tree limb. Nest have been found between about 5 and 35 m (15 and 115 ft) above the ground; most are quite high. The clutch size, incubation period, time to fledging, and details of parental care are not known.

=== Vocalization ===
Male white-lored euphonias usually sing from a high open perch, often while bobbing their body up and down and twitching their tail. Their song is "a jumble of chit, sit, spitz, week and other notes, sputtering on in fits and starts...e.g. p-pfits’et cheéu...sit, fits...pa’fits-a-whew!...". A song bout may last several minutes with pauses of varying length. The species' calls include a "variety of smacking notes and short whistles" such as "a rather loud buzzy spitz wéet!" and "a sharp, smacking spitz!".

== Status ==
The IUCN has assessed the white-lored euphonia as being of Least Concern. It has an extremely large range; its population size is not known and is believed to be decreasing. No immediate threats have been identified. However, it "has been reported as used in trade at a low prevalence". It is considered fairly common in Colombia and Peru, common in Venezuela, and "common to frequent" in Brazil. It occurs in many protected areas across its range, which "also includes extensive intact habitat which, though unprotected, is at little near-term risk".
