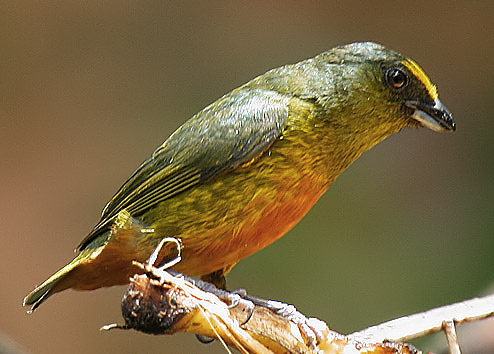
- Male E. g. praetermissa, Costa Rica

Conservation status
- Least Concern (IUCN 3.1)

Scientific classification
- Kingdom: Animalia
- Phylum: Chordata
- Class: Aves
- Order: Passeriformes
- Family: Fringillidae
- Subfamily: Euphoniinae
- Genus: Euphonia
- Species: E. gouldi

Binomial name
- Euphonia gouldi Sclater, PL, 1857

= Olive-backed euphonia =

Species of bird

The olive-backed euphonia (Euphonia gouldi) is a species of bird in the family Fringillidae, the finches and euphonias. It is found from Mexico to Panama.

== Taxonomy and systematics ==
The olive-backed euphonia was originally described by Philip Sclater in 1857 with its current binomial Euphonia gouldi (though spelled "Euphonia Gouldi). Sclater chose the specific epithet gouldi to honor the English ornithologist John Gould, "one of the most eminent naturalists of the day", who had collected the type specimen. At the time, the genus Euphonia was a member of the family Thraupidae, the "true" tanagers. Multiple studies in the late twentieth and early twenty-first centuries resulted in Euphonia being reassigned to its present place in the family Fringillidae.

The olive-backed euphonia has two subspecies, the nominate E. g. gouldi (Sclater, PL, 1857), and E. g. praetermissa (Peters, JL, 1929).

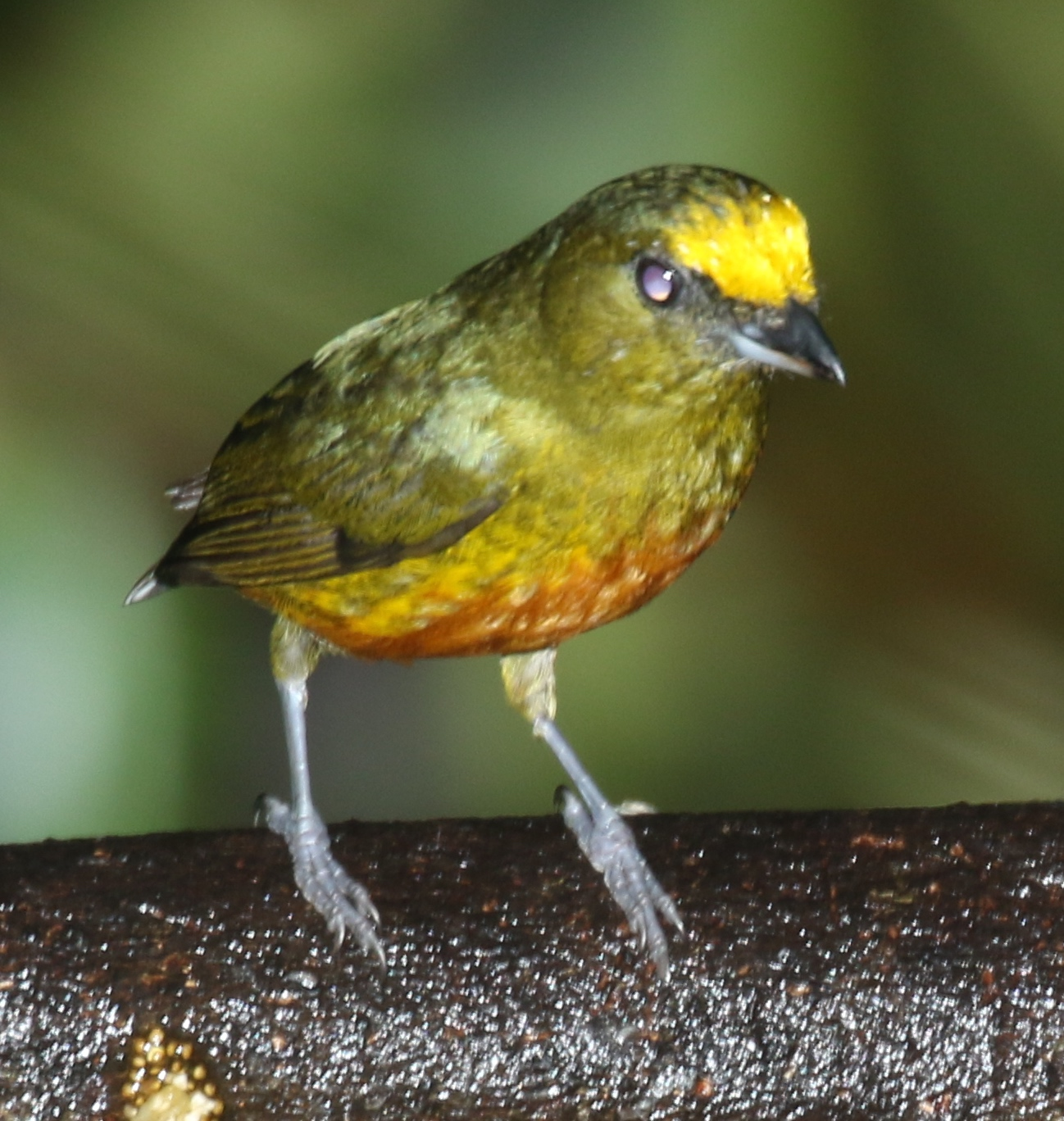
Olive-backed euphonia (flash photo) Selva Verde Lodge - Costa Rica

== Description ==
The olive-backed euphonia is 9 to 10 cm (3.5 to 3.9 in) long and weighs about 11 to 16 g (0.39 to 0.56 oz). It is a small euphonia with a thick stubby bill. The species is sexually dimorphic. Adult males of the nominate subspecies have a yellow forehead; the patch extends to the rear of the eye and sometimes has light black flecks. The rest of their crown, and their nape, upperparts, and tail are olive-green. All of them except the uppertail coverts have a bluish gray gloss. Their upperwing coverts are bronzy olive-green, their primary coverts black, and their flight feathers dusky with greenish yellow edges. The sides of their chest and their underparts from the lower breast are bright yellow. Adult females have a rufous-chestnut forehead. Their crown, nape, and upper back are dark olive-green with a grayish blue tinge. Their lower back, uppertail coverts, and tail are yellowish olive-green. Their upperwing coverts and flight feathers are dusky with wide yellowish olive edges. Their face, throat, and chest are olive, their sides and flanks mottled with yellow and olive, and their breast, belly, and undertail coverts tawny-rufous. Adult females have a dark rufous forehead. The rest of their upperparts are dull olive with a light gray tinge. Their underparts are mostly yellowish olive with darker olive sides and flanks and dark rufous vent and undertail coverts. Subspecies E. g. praetermissa is smaller than the nominate. Males have less chestnut on their underparts but are otherwise the same as the nominate. Females do not differ from the nominate. Both sexes of both subspecies have a dark brown iris, a blackish bill with a pale blue-gray base to the mandible, and dark gray legs and feet.

== Distribution and habitat ==
The nominate subspecies of the olive-backed euphonia is the more northerly of the two. It is found on the Gulf-Caribbean slope from southern Veracruz and northern Oaxaca in Mexico south through Belize and across northern Guatemala into much of northern and eastern Honduras. There are also sight records further inland in Honduras. Subspecies E. g. praetermissa is found along the Caribbean slope from extreme southeastern Honduras through Nicaragua and Costa Rica to northwestern Veraguas Province in northwestern Panama. Its range also extends west across northern Costa Rica to eastern Guanacaste Province.

The olive-backed euphonia primarily inhabits the interior and edges of tropical rainforest. It also occurs in mature secondary forest and sometimes in gardens. One source states that its upper elevational limit is 900 m (3,000 ft). However, reaches 1,300 m (4,300 ft) in northern Central America and 1,000 m (3,300 ft) in Costa Rica.

== Behavior ==
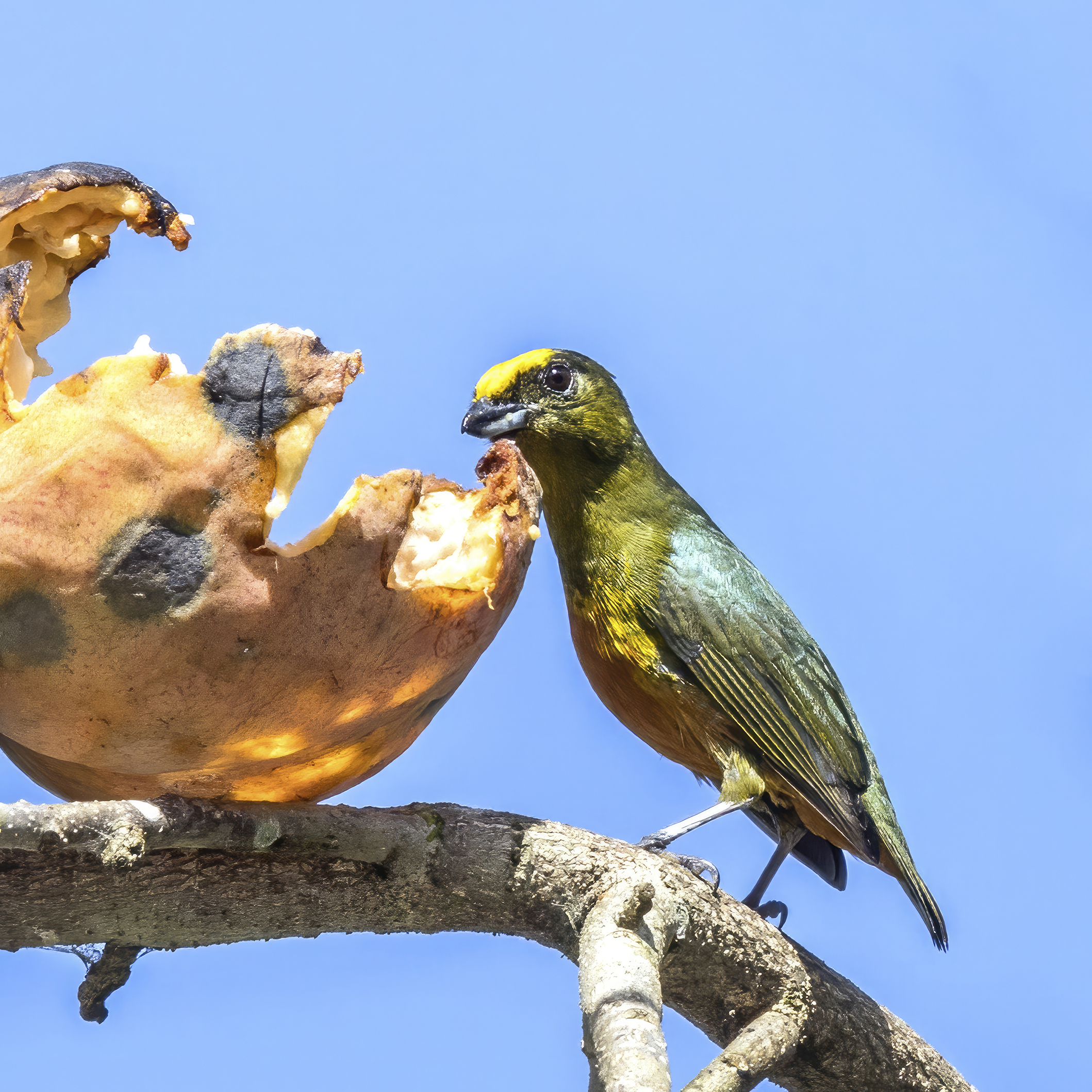
E. g. gouldi feeding on custard apple (Annona reticulata)

=== Movement ===
The olive-backed euphonia is a year-round resident.

=== Feeding ===
The olive-backed euphonia feeds primarily on small fruits. It mostly forages singly and in pairs, sometimes in small groups, and regularly joins with mixed-species feeding flocks. In the forest it forages primarily from the mid-level to the canopy but will feed at all levels.

=== Breeding ===
The olive-backed euphonia breeds between February and July in Costa Rica and its season in Belize includes May. Its nest is a globe with a side entrance, made from moss, roots, and plant fibers lined with fine grass or plant fiber. It is typically placed in a clump of moss or epiphytes or within a vine tangle on a branch. Nests have been found between about 2 and 15 m (5 and 50 ft) above the ground. The clutch is usually three eggs but two to four are known. They are dull white with brown markings. The incubation period, time to fledging, and details of parental care are not known.

=== Vocalization ===
The olive-backed euphonia's song is "a rapid jumble of chatters, buzzes, and harsh whistles". Its calls "include a chi'chi'chi'cheet and a liquid tsip'please-seeee'up!. Another description of its song is "a rambling medley of whistles, chatters and staccato notes, some dry and chaffy, some musical" that may continue for a long time.

== Status ==
The IUCN has assessed the olive-backed euphonia as being of Least Concern. It has a large range; its estimated population of at least 50,000 mature individuals is believed to be decreasing. No immediate threats have been identified. It is considered fairly common in northern Central America and common in Costa Rica. It occurs in many protected areas throughout most of its range. However, its "range formerly included much forest outside protected areas, but few large areas of suitable lowland forest now remain, except in N Guatemala and E Nicaragua".
