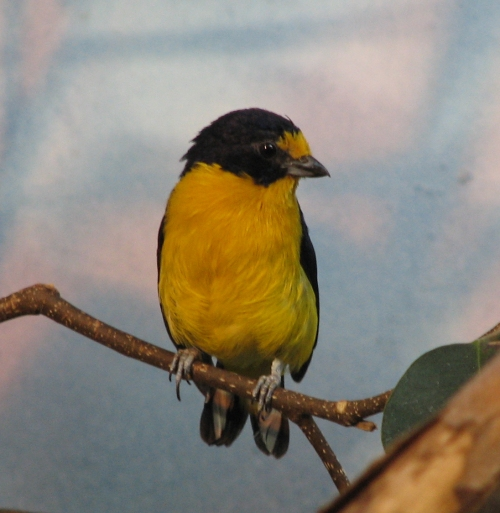
- Violaceous euphonia, Euphonia violacea

Scientific classification
- Kingdom: Animalia
- Phylum: Chordata
- Class: Aves
- Order: Passeriformes
- Family: Fringillidae
- Subfamily: Euphoniinae
- Genus: Euphonia; Desmarest, 1806

Type species
- Euphonia olivacea = Euphonia minuta Desmarest, 1806

Species
- See text.

= Euphonia =

Genus of birds

Euphonias are members of the genus Euphonia, a group of Neotropical birds in the finch family. They and the chlorophonias comprise the subfamily Euphoniinae.

The genus name comes from Ancient Greek εὖ (eû), meaning "well, "good", and φωνή (phōnḗ), meaning "sound", and thus, "of good sound", due to the pleasing calls of the bird.

Most male euphonias are dark metallic blue above and bright yellow below. Many have contrasting pale foreheads and white undertails. Some have light blue patches on the head and/or orangish underparts. Females much more plain, predominantly olive-green all over. They range in overall length from 9 to 11 cm (3 1/2 to 4 1/2 in). They eat small fruit and berries, particularly mistletoe (Loranthaceae). Some species may also eat some insects.

== Taxonomy ==
Euphonias were once considered members of the tanager family, Thraupidae. A molecular phylogenetic study of the finch family Fringillidae published in 2012 included 9 species from the genus Euphonia and a single species from the genus Chlorophonia, the blue-naped chlorophonia. The resulting cladogram showed the blue-naped chlorophonia nested within the Euphonia clade implying that the genus Euphonia is paraphyletic. The genus was introduced in 1806 by the French zoologist Anselme Gaëtan Desmarest in his Histoire naturelle des tangaras, des manakins et des todiers with the white-vented euphonia as the type species.

A taxonomic analysis published in 2020 found that the genus Euphonia was paraphyletic with respect to Chlorophonia. To resolve the paraphyly the authors of the study proposed the resurrection of the genus Cyanophonia that had been introduced in 1851 by Charles Lucien Bonaparte. They suggested that the Antillean euphonia (Cyanophonia musica) should be the type species. The proposed genus would contain three species: the Antillean euphonia, the golden-rumped euphonia and the elegant euphonia. An alternative and simpler way to resolve the paraphyly would be move the three species from Euphonia into Chlorophonia, which has been followed by the IOC.

== Species list ==
The genus contains the following 25 species:

Image	Common name	Scientific name	Distribution
	Jamaican euphonia	Euphonia jamaica	Jamaica
	Orange-crowned euphonia	Euphonia saturata	Colombia, Ecuador, and Peru
	Plumbeous euphonia	Euphonia plumbea	Brazil, Colombia, French Guiana, Guyana, Peru, Suriname, and Venezuela.
	Purple-throated euphonia	Euphonia chlorotica	Argentina, Bolivia, Brazil, Colombia, Ecuador, French Guiana, Guyana, Paraguay, Peru, Suriname, Uruguay, and Venezuela.
	Finsch's euphonia	Euphonia finschi	Brazil, French Guiana, Guyana, Suriname and eastern Venezuela.
	Velvet-fronted euphonia	Euphonia concinna	Colombia
	Trinidad euphonia	Euphonia trinitatis	Colombia, Trinidad and Tobago, and Venezuela.
	West Mexican euphonia	Euphonia godmani	Mexico
	Scrub euphonia	Euphonia affinis	Belize, Guatemala, Honduras and Nicaragua and along the Atlantic coastal lowlands in Costa Rica.
	Yellow-crowned euphonia	Euphonia luteicapilla	Costa Rica, Nicaragua, and Panama
	White-lored euphonia	Euphonia chrysopasta	Bolivia, Brazil, Colombia, Ecuador, French Guiana, Guyana, Peru, Suriname, and Venezuela.
	White-vented euphonia	Euphonia minuta	southern Mexico south along the Pacific coast to northwestern Ecuador, the second across northern South America from the eastern Andean foothills as far east as the state of Pará in Brazil, and south to northern Bolivia.
	Green-chinned euphonia	Euphonia chalybea	northeastern Argentina, Brazil and Paraguay.
	Violaceous euphonia	Euphonia violacea	Trinidad, Tobago and eastern Venezuela south to Paraguay and northeastern Argentina.
	Yellow-throated euphonia	Euphonia hirundinacea	from Belize south to western Panama
	Thick-billed euphonia	Euphonia laniirostris	Bolivia, Brazil, Colombia, Costa Rica, Ecuador, Panama, Peru, and Venezuela.
	Spot-crowned euphonia	Euphonia imitans	Costa Rica and Panama.
	Olive-backed euphonia	Euphonia gouldi	southern Mexico to western Panama.
	Fulvous-vented euphonia	Euphonia fulvicrissa	Colombia
	Tawny-capped euphonia	Euphonia anneae	Colombia, Costa Rica, and Panama.
	Orange-bellied euphonia	Euphonia xanthogaster	Bolivia, Brazil, Colombia, Ecuador, Guyana, Panama, Peru, and Venezuela.
	Bronze-green euphonia	Euphonia mesochrysa	Bolivia, Colombia, Ecuador, and Peru.
	Golden-sided euphonia	Euphonia cayennensis	Brazil, French Guiana, Guyana, Suriname and eastern Venezuela.
	Rufous-bellied euphonia	Euphonia rufiventris	Bolivia, Brazil, Colombia, Ecuador, Peru, and Venezuela.
	Chestnut-bellied euphonia	Euphonia pectoralis	Argentina, Brazil, and Paraguay.

The black-throated euphonia ("Euphonia vittata") is now thought to be a hybrid between the chestnut-bellied euphonia and the orange-bellied euphonia.
