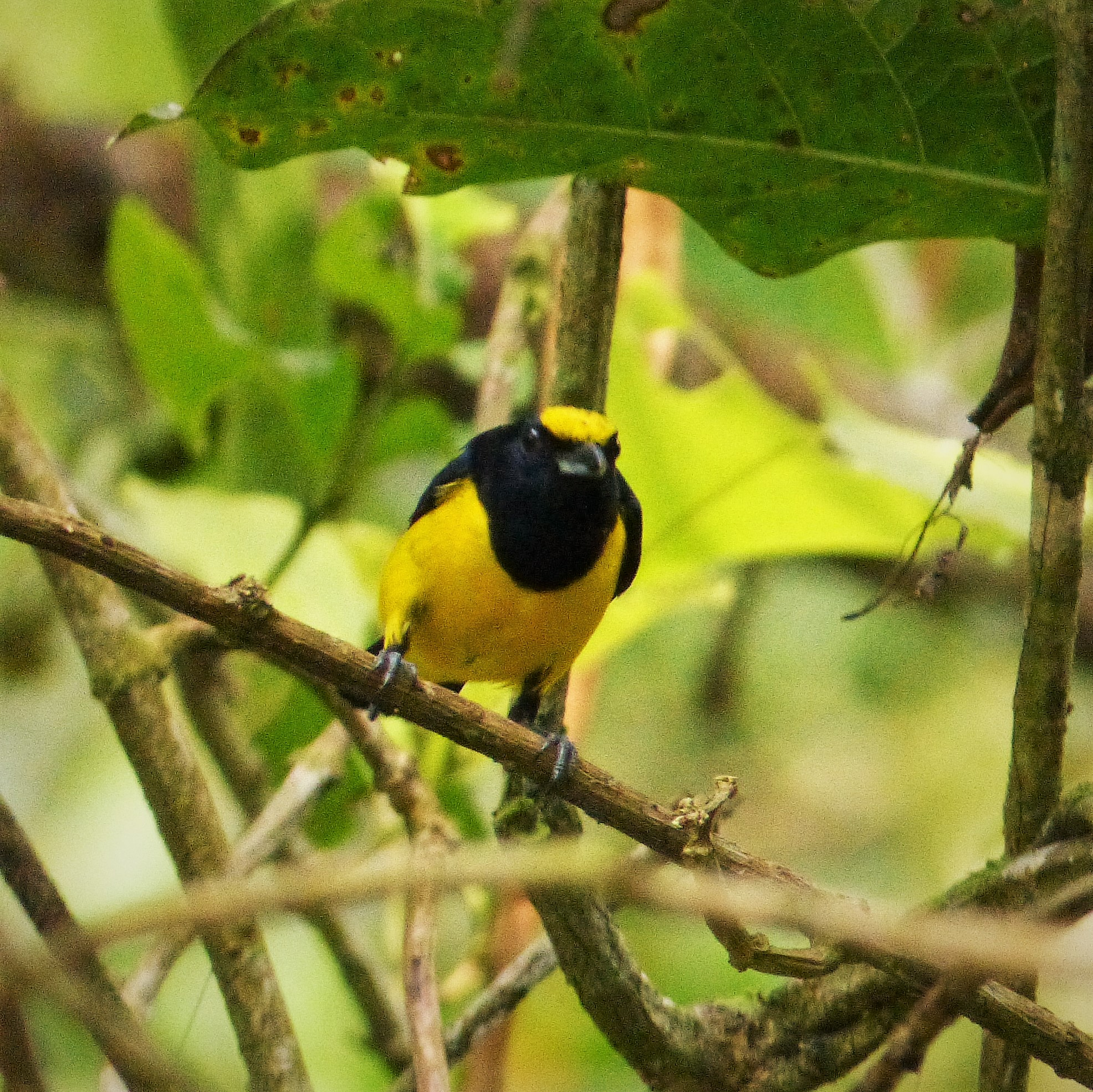

Conservation status
- Least Concern (IUCN 3.1)

Scientific classification
- Kingdom: Animalia
- Phylum: Chordata
- Class: Aves
- Order: Passeriformes
- Family: Fringillidae
- Subfamily: Euphoniinae
- Genus: Euphonia
- Species: E. imitans

Binomial name
- Euphonia imitans (Hellmayr, 1936)

= Spot-crowned euphonia =

Species of bird

The spot-crowned euphonia (Euphonia imitans) is a species of bird in the family Fringillidae, the finches and euphonias. It is found in Costa Rica and Panama.

== Taxonomy and systematics ==
The spot-crowned euphonia was originally described in 1936 with the binomial Tanagra imitans and the English name "tawny-bellied euphonia". The genus Tanagra (Tangara) is a member of the family Thraupidae, the "true" tanagers, where the species remained after being reassigned to genus Euphonia. Multiple studies in the late twentieth and early twenty-first centuries resulted in Euphonia being reassigned to its present place in the family Fringillidae.

The spot-crowned euphonia is monotypic.

== Description ==
The spot-crowned euphonia is about 10 cm (3.9 in) long and weighs about 14 g (0.49 oz). It is a small euphonia with a stubby bill. The species is sexually dimorphic. Adult males have a bright yellow forehead; the patch extends to the rear of the eye and is speckled with black. The rest of their crown and their face, nape, throat, chest, and upperparts are steely blue-black. Their upperwing coverts are a slightly glossy blue-black. Their flight feathers are dusky with a blue-black tinge and white bases on the inner webs of most feathers. Their tail is dusky with a blue-black tinge. The sides of their chest and their underparts from the lower breast are bright yellow. Adult females have a rufous-chestnut forehead. Their crown, nape, and upper back are dark olive-green with a grayish blue tinge. Their lower back, uppertail coverts, and tail are yellowish olive-green. Their upperwing coverts and flight feathers are dusky with wide yellowish olive edges. The center of their lower breast, belly, and undertail coverts are tawny-rufous and the rest of their underparts are olive-yellow that is lightest on the throat. Both sexes have a dark brown iris, a blackish bill with a pale blue-gray base to the mandible, and dark gray legs and feet.

== Distribution and habitat ==
The spot-crowned euphonia is found on the Pacific slope from central Puntarenas and San José provinces in Costa Rica south to Panama's Chiriquí Province. It inhabits the interior, edges, and clearings in evergreen forest and mature secondary forest in the tropical and lower subtropical zones. Sources differ slightly on its maximum elevation. One says it is 1,350 m (4,400 ft), another that it is about 1,350 m (4,400 ft) and a third that it is 1,400 m (4,600 ft).

== Behavior ==
=== Movement ===
The spot-crowned euphonia is a year-round resident.

=== Feeding ===
The spot-crowned euphonia feeds primarily on small fruits, and also includes smaller amounts of larger fruits, nectar, and insects in its diet. It mostly forages singly and in pairs, and regularly associates with mixed-species feeding flocks. In the forest it forages primarily from the mid-level to the canopy.

=== Breeding ===
The spot-crowned euphonia breeds between March and June in Costa Rica and may attempt two broods there. Both sexes build the nest, an enclosed dome with a side entrance made from moss, rootlets, and ferns lined with fine plant fibers. It often is placed in a clump of epiphytes on a branch. Nests have been found between 2 and 7.5 m (7 and 25 ft) above the ground. The clutch is usually two eggs though some have three. They are white or pinkish white with sparse brown marks. The female alone incubates, for about 18 days. The time to fledging and details of parental care are not known.

=== Vocalization ===
The spot-crowned euphonia "produces rolling, buzzy utterances". Its song "typically consists of a note or phrase repeated 5–8 times, followed by abrupt shift to another series; some songs are clear sweet warbles, others chaffy or wheezy and dry, e.g. chip a cheer weet; chip tuck tuck; wee churee-cha..., and so on". A song bout may last up to 30 minutes. The species' calls include "a rolling or rattled tr’r’r’r’r or chu’r’r’r’r...all with metallic quality", "a sibilant yerrlirr", and "scolds with [a] harsh, rolling jurry-jurry".

== Status ==
The IUCN has assessed the spot-crowned euphonia as being of Least Concern. It has a limited range; its estimated population of at least 50,000 mature individuals is believed to be decreasing. No immediate threats have been identified. It is considered uncommon in Costa Rica. It occurs in a few protected areas. "Although this species is not currently considered threatened, much of the native forest within its range has been destroyed and its now fragmented populations are in urgent need of monitoring."
