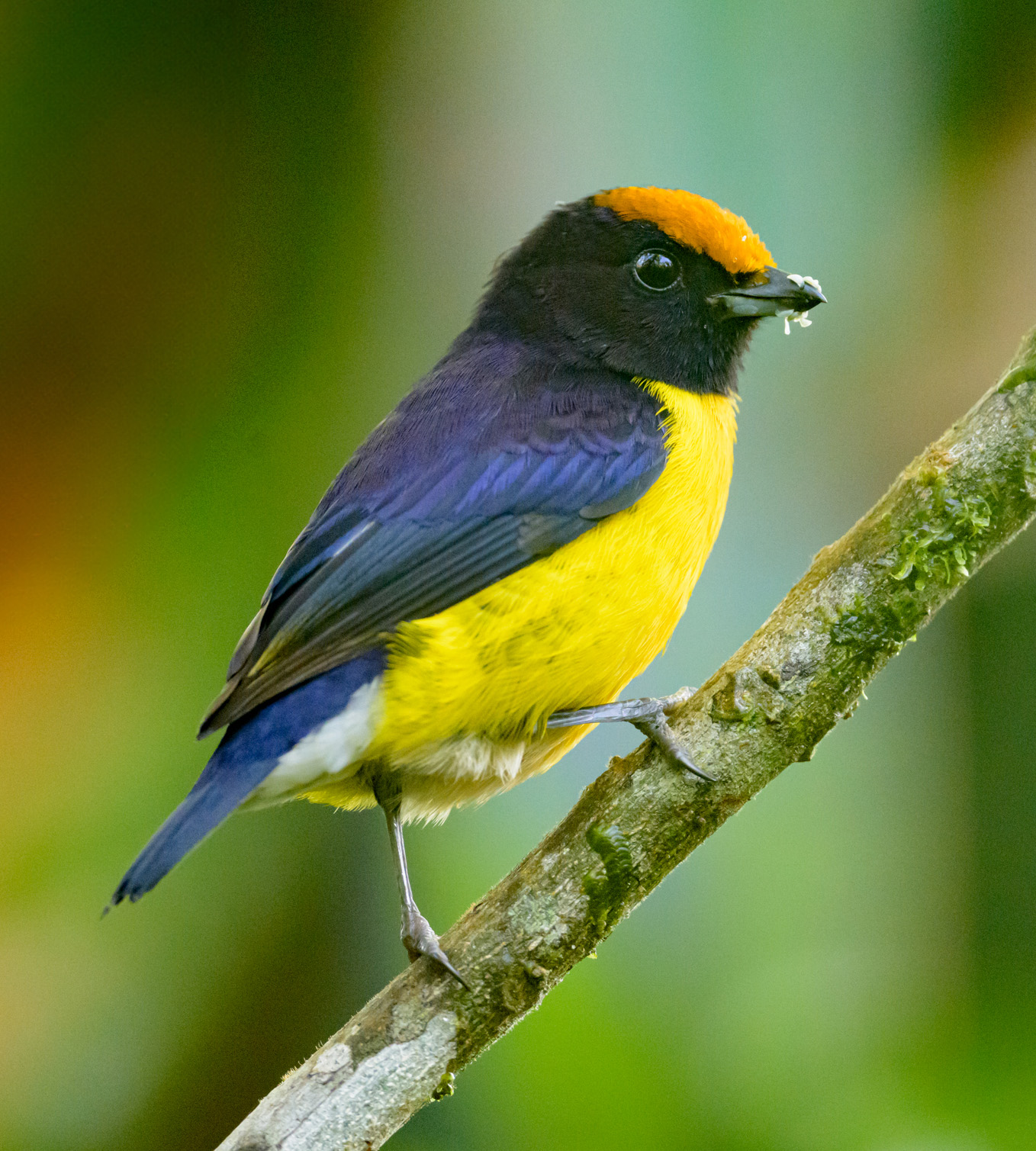
- Tawny-capped euphonia (Euphonia anneae)

Scientific classification
- Kingdom: Animalia
- Phylum: Chordata
- Class: Aves
- Order: Passeriformes
- Family: Fringillidae
- Subfamily: Euphoniinae; Cabanis, 1847

Genera
- Euphonia; Chlorophonia

= Euphoniinae =

Subfamily of birds

Euphoniinae is a subfamily of finches endemic to the Neotropics. It contains two genera, Euphonia and Chlorophonia.

The two genera were at one time included in the tanager family Thraupidae. In a large phylogenetic study of the finch family using mitochondrial and nuclear DNA sequences published in 2012, Zuccon and colleagues found that the only Chlorophonia species included in their analysis, the blue-naped chlorophonia, was nested within the Euphonia. This indicated that the genus Euphonia was paraphyletic. A study with more species would be necessary to resolve the taxonomy of the subfamily.

== Species list ==
Image	Genus	Living species
	Euphonia Desmarest, 1806 - the euphonias	Jamaican euphonia, Euphonia jamaica; Orange-crowned euphonia, Euphonia saturata; Plumbeous euphonia, Euphonia plumbea; Purple-throated euphonia, Euphonia chlorotica; Finsch's euphonia, Euphonia finschi; Velvet-fronted euphonia, Euphonia concinna; Trinidad euphonia, Euphonia trinitatis; West Mexican euphonia, Euphonia godmani; Scrub euphonia, Euphonia affinis; Yellow-crowned euphonia, Euphonia luteicapilla; White-lored euphonia, Euphonia chrysopasta; White-vented euphonia, Euphonia minuta; Green-chinned euphonia, Euphonia chalybea; Violaceous euphonia, Euphonia violacea; Yellow-throated euphonia, Euphonia hirundinacea; Thick-billed euphonia, Euphonia laniirostris; Spot-crowned euphonia, Euphonia imitans; Olive-backed euphonia, Euphonia gouldi; Fulvous-vented euphonia, Euphonia fulvicrissa; Tawny-capped euphonia, Euphonia anneae; Orange-bellied euphonia, Euphonia xanthogaster; Bronze-green euphonia, Euphonia mesochrysa; Golden-sided euphonia, Euphonia cayennensis; Rufous-bellied euphonia, Euphonia rufiventris; Chestnut-bellied euphonia, Euphonia pectoralis
	Chlorophonia Bonaparte, 1851 - the chlorophonias	Elegant euphonia, Chlorophonia elegantissima; Hispaniolan euphonia, Chlorophonia musica; Lesser Antillean euphonia, Chlorophonia flavifrons; Puerto Rican euphonia, Chlorophonia sclateri; Golden-rumped euphonia, Chlorophonia cyanocephala; Blue-naped chlorophonia, Chlorophonia cyanea; Chestnut-breasted chlorophonia, Chlorophonia pyrrhophrys; Yellow-collared chlorophonia, Chlorophonia flavirostris; Blue-crowned chlorophonia, Chlorophonia occipitalis; Golden-browed chlorophonia, Chlorophonia callophrys
