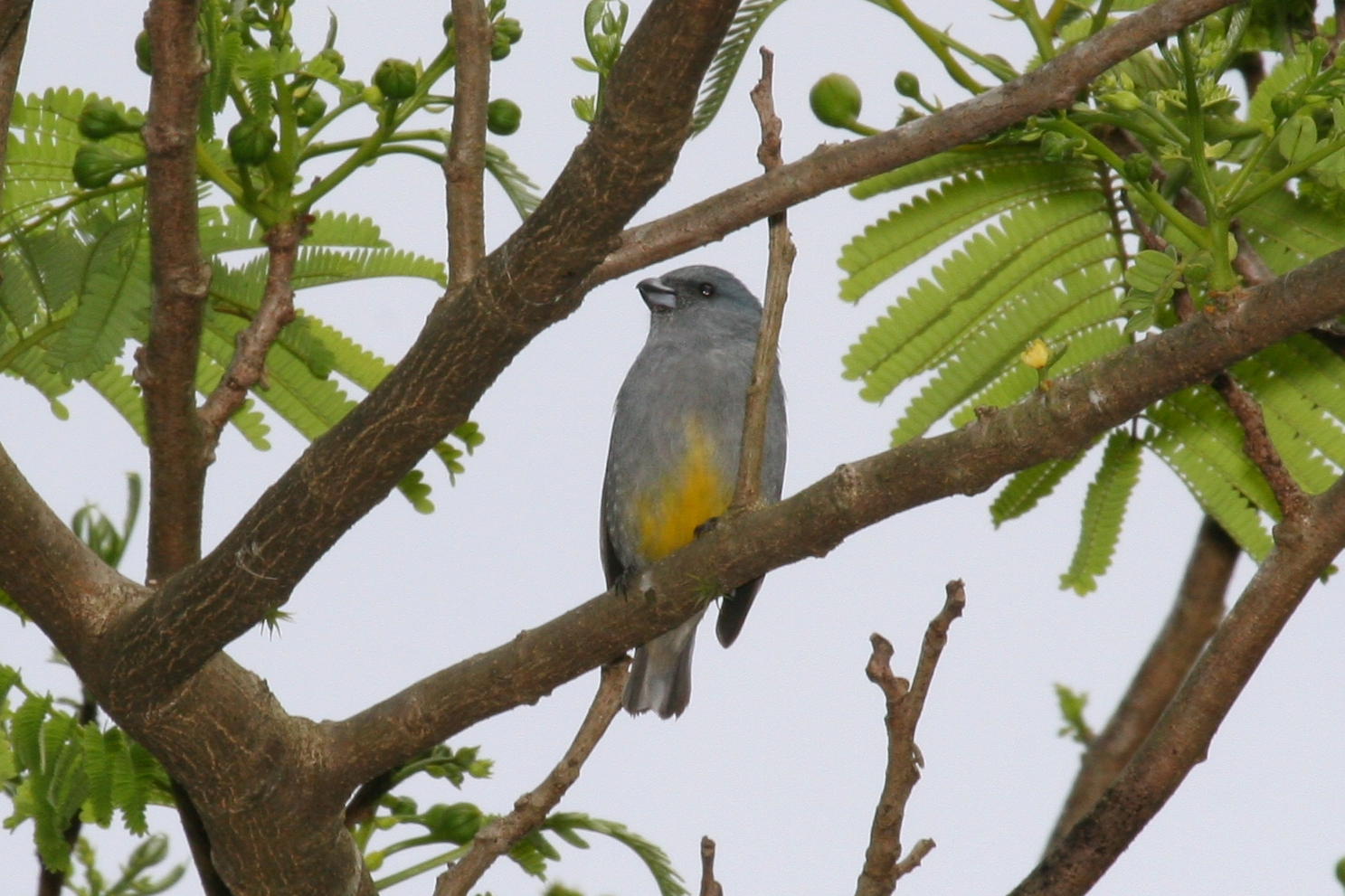

Conservation status
- Least Concern (IUCN 3.1)

Scientific classification
- Kingdom: Animalia
- Phylum: Chordata
- Class: Aves
- Order: Passeriformes
- Family: Fringillidae
- Subfamily: Euphoniinae
- Genus: Euphonia
- Species: E. jamaica

Binomial name
- Euphonia jamaica (Linnaeus, 1766)

Synonyms
- Fringilla jamaica Linnaeus, 1766

= Jamaican euphonia =

Species of bird

The Jamaican euphonia (Euphonia Jamaica) is a species of bird in the family Fringillidae. Jamaican euphonias are small and have a varying appearance depending on their sex and age. They are the only species of Euphonia that reside in Jamaica and have received the nickname of "Short-Mouth Bluequit" from Jamaican locals. These birds do not migrate anywhere and can be found throughout the island in wooded areas, shrublands, gardens, orchards, and hilly lowlands.

== _{Appearance} ==
The appearance of the Jamaican Euphonia is different for males and females. Males are a bluish-grey color with a yellow belly and pale undertail coverts, females are bicolored and have grey foreparts and olive backs and tails. Both males and females have short, thick bills. The appearance of a Jamaican Euphonia between the juvenile and adult stages are similar to the appearance of the female, although the coloration of a bird in this stage is not as bright. The average Jamaican Euphonia is 11 centimeters (about 4.33 in) in length and weighs 17 grams.

== _{Habitat} ==
Jamaican Euphonias do not migrate anywhere and only live on the island of Jamaica. These birds live in various topographical regions on the island including wooded areas, shrublands, gardens, and orchards. Of the various locations the Jamaican Euphonia lives, it is found most often in hilly lowlands. They can be found anywhere from altitudes of 0 meters at sea level to 2250 meters (about 1.4 mi) at the height of the tallest mountain in Jamaica, Blue Mountain Peak.While they are not migratory, Jamaican euphonias have been reported to undertake seasonal movements around the island.

== _{Diet and Foraging} ==
The diet of the Jamaican Euphonia consists mostly of fruits and berries. Mistletoe berries, also known as Loranthaceae, compose a major portion of their diet. Fruit of figs (Ficus, Cecropia, Dunalia), fruit of cho-cho vines (Sechium), and guava (Psidium) are also part of their diet. To find food, they may forage in a small flock or gather with other birds at feeding sights. In a study done on the winter fat storage of migrant and resident birds in Jamaica, researchers found that the Jamaican Euphonia has greater fat storage than other species. Due to their fruit-based diet, flocks of Jamaican Euphonias can damage cultivated fruit crops in gardens and orchards.

== _{Nesting Behavior} ==
The breeding season of the Jamaican Euphonia is between February and May while the nesting season is between March and May. Both males and females build nests, which are made from a mixture of grass and plant stems and concealed in Spanish Moss (Tillandsia). The nest is structured as a dome and has an entrance on one side. During the nesting period, females will lay 3–4 white eggs with lavender, red, and brown markings. These markings are concentrated at the larger end of the egg.

== _{Conservation Status} ==
The Jamaican Euphonia is listed by the 2016 IUCN Red List of threatened species as of "Least Concern" in the most recent evaluation. The current population trend is listed as stable, although the total population is unknown. While these birds are not individually protected, they inhabit land and water areas that are protected. The lifespan of a Jamaican Euphonia is 3.5 years, and the species faces no known threats.

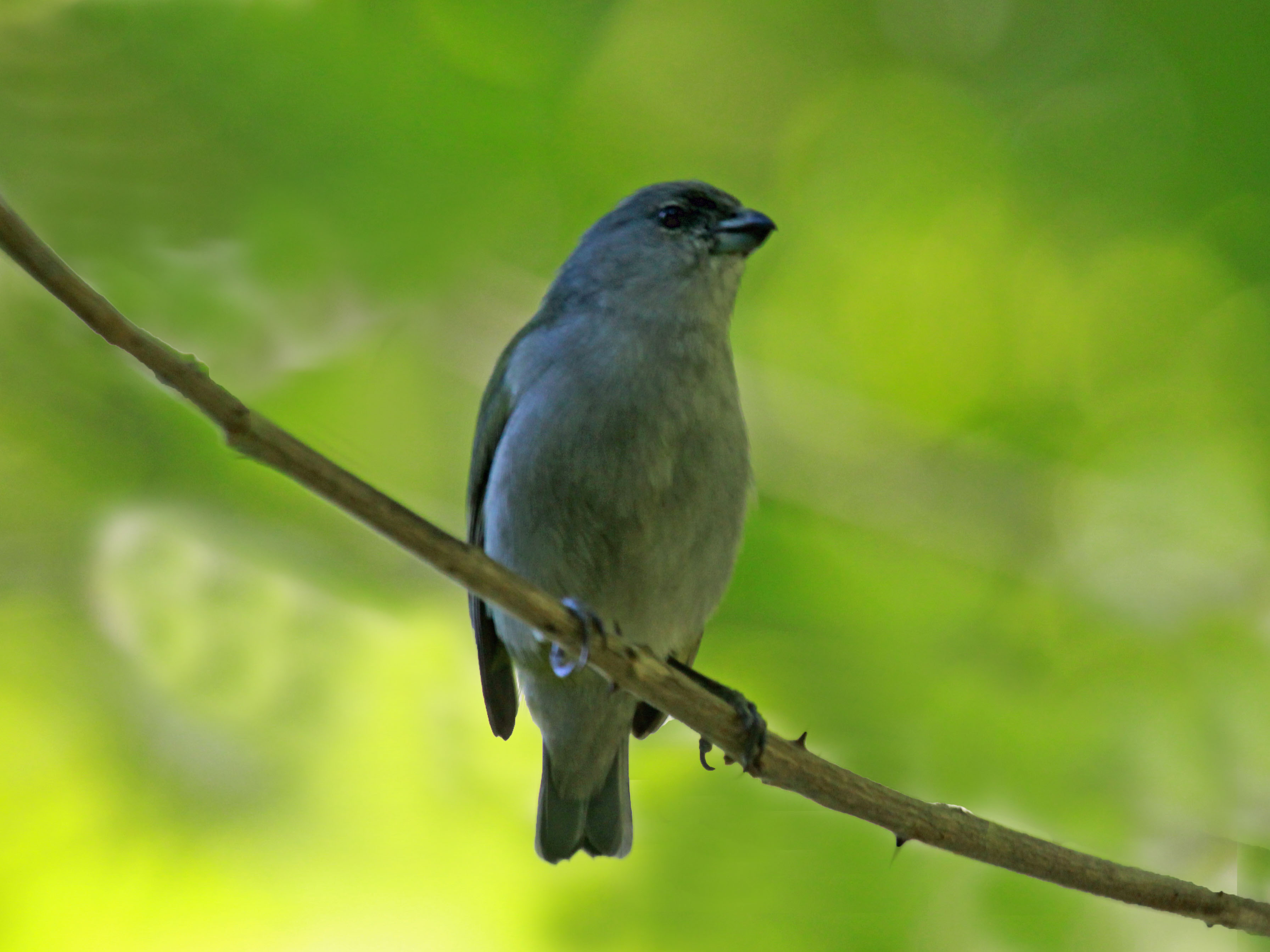
