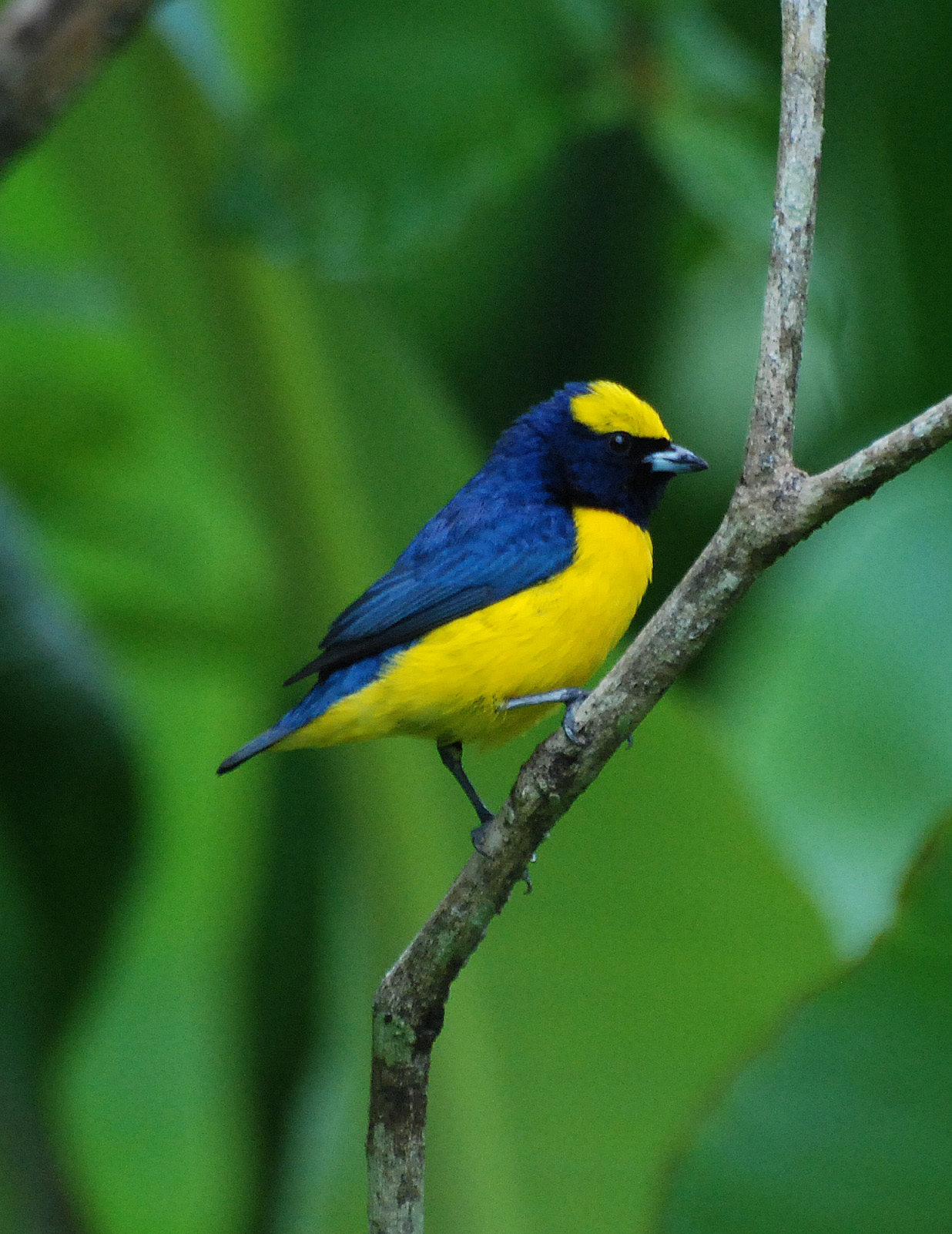

Conservation status
- Least Concern (IUCN 3.1)

Scientific classification
- Kingdom: Animalia
- Phylum: Chordata
- Class: Aves
- Order: Passeriformes
- Family: Fringillidae
- Subfamily: Euphoniinae
- Genus: Euphonia
- Species: E. luteicapilla

Binomial name
- Euphonia luteicapilla (Cabanis, 1861)

= Yellow-crowned euphonia =

Species of bird

The yellow-crowned euphonia (Euphonia luteicapilla) is a species of bird in the family Fringillidae, the finches and euphonias. It is found in Costa Rica, Nicaragua, and Panama.

== Taxonomy and systematics ==
The yellow-crowned euphonia was originally described in 1861 with the binomial Phonasca luteicapilla. It was eventually reassigned to genus Euphonia. The genus Euphonia had long placed in the family Thraupidae, the "true" tanagers. Multiple studies in the late twentieth and early twenty-first centuries resulted in its being reassigned to its present place in the family Fringillidae.

The yellow-crowned euphonia is monotypic.

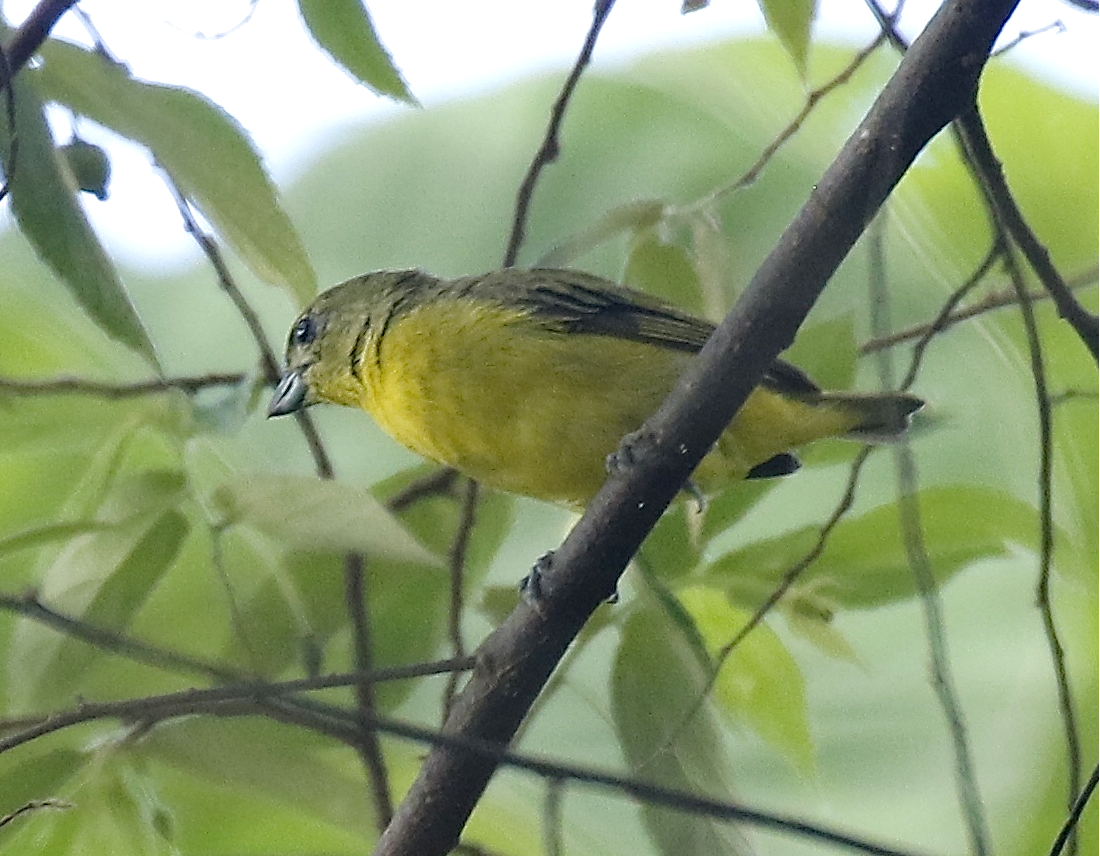
Female. Canopy Camp - Darien, Panama

== Description ==
The yellow-crowned euphonia is about 9 to 10 cm (3.5 to 3.9 in) long and weighs 11.4 to 14.5 g (0.40 to 0.51 oz). It has a short stubby bill. The species is sexually dimorphic. Adult males have a large yellow forecrown and crown; the color extends well past the eye. The rest of their head, nape, and throat are glossy blue-black. Their upperparts, wings, and tail are also glossy blue-black. Their breast, belly, and undertail coverts are bright yellow. Adult females have an olive head, upperparts, wings, and tail with a yellowish tinge on the forehead. Their underparts are mostly olive-yellow with a slightly paler center and a duller belly and undertail coverts. Both sexes have a dark brown iris, a blue-gray bill with a blackish tip, and dark gray legs and feet.

== Distribution and habitat ==
The yellow-crowned euphonia is found from eastern Nicaragua south along the Caribbean slope through Costa Rica into northwestern Panama's Bocas del Toro Province. It also is found on the Pacific slope from Puntarenas Province in west-central Costa Rica south to Darién Province in eastern Panama. It inhabits a variety of landscapes in the tropical and lower subtropical zones. In Nicaragua and Panama it is found mostly in humid areas where it favors semi-open areas such as the edges of forest, clearings and pastures with trees, and gardens. In Panama it occurs mostly in drier areas such as scrublands but also on dry forest edge and in clearings and pastures with trees. Two sources state that its upper elevation limit is about 900 m (3,000 ft) though one of them notes that it also rarely reaches 1,900 m (6,200 ft) in Panama. Another states that it reaches 1,200 m (3,900 ft) in Costa Rica.

== Behavior ==
=== Movement ===
The yellow-crowned euphonia is generally a resident species but some elevational movements have been reported in Costa Rica.

=== Feeding ===
The yellow-crowned euphonia feeds primarily on the fruits of mistletoe (Loranthaceae) and other small fruits, and probably also includes small numbers of insects in its diet. It forages mostly singly, in pairs, and small groups. It wanders widely to find fruiting trees and may share them with other species. It forages mostly in the treetops.

=== Breeding ===
The yellow-crowned euphonia breeds in Costa Rica between January and July, but mostly from February to May. Its season in Panama apparently includes March but is not otherwise defined. Both sexes build the nest, a small globe with a side entrance and made from several kinds of plant fibers lined with soft plant fibers and hair. It can be placed in a cluster of twigs, in orchids or epiphytes on a tree, or in a crevice in a stump or fence post. Nests have been found as high as 30 m (100 ft) above the ground but most are within about 2 to 3 m (7 to 10 ft) of it. The clutch is two to four eggs but usually three; the eggs are white with heavy brown mottling. The female alone incubates, for 13 to 14 days. Fledging occurs an unusually long 22 to 24 days after hatch and both parents provision nestlings by regurgitation.

=== Vocalization ===
The yellow-crowned euphonia sings "a short, dry sputtering series of notes, e.g. pit ditrééa-twiddledee bee bee" that has also been described as "a short wiry chut-tsip ts’tsew tsiuweer". Its call is "a series of 2–3 clear high whistled notes that may be given at varying speed, ee-bee-bee" or given as a longer series "beebee, peepeepee". It also makes "tsit notes" as a contact and flight call.

== Status ==
The IUCN has assessed the yellow-crowned euphonia as being of Least Concern. It has a large range and its estimated population of at least 500,000 mature individuals is believed to be stable. No immediate threats have been identified. It is considered fairly common overall and common in Costa Rica. It is found in many protected areas and also in many unprotected areas that "are at little risk of development".
