= List of true finch species =

The family Fringillidae are the "true" finches. The International Ornithological Committee (IOC) recognizes these 238 species in the family, distributed among three subfamilies and 50 genera. Confusingly, only 78 of the species include "finch" in their common names, and several other families include species called finches. This list includes 18 extinct species, the Bonin grosbeak and 17 Hawaiian honeycreepers.

This list is presented according to the IOC taxonomic sequence and can also be sorted alphabetically by common name, binomial, population, and status.

Common name	Population	Status	Trend	Notes	Binomial name + authority	IOC sequence
Eurasian chaffinch	500,000,000-799,999,999	LC	▲		Fringilla coelebs Linnaeus, 1758	1
African chaffinch	Unknown	NE	?		Fringilla spodiogenys Bonaparte, 1841	2
Azores chaffinch	Unknown	NE	?		Fringilla moreletti Pucheran, 1859	3
Madeira chaffinch	Unknown	NE	?		Fringilla maderensis Sharpe, 1888	4
Canary Islands chaffinch	Unknown	NE	?		Fringilla canariensis Vieillot, 1817	5
Tenerife blue chaffinch	2000-5000 (estimated 3200)	NT	▲		Fringilla teydea Webb, Berthelot & Moquin-Tandon, 1836	6
Gran Canaria blue chaffinch	430	EN	▲		Fringilla polatzeki Hartert, EJO, 1905	7
Brambling	35,000,000-65,000,000	LC	▼		Fringilla montifringilla Linnaeus, 1758	8
Black-and-yellow grosbeak	Unknown	LC	▼		Mycerobas icterioides (Vigors, 1830)	9
Collared grosbeak	Unknown	LC	▼		Mycerobas affinis (Blyth, 1855)	10
Spot-winged grosbeak	Unknown	LC	▼		Mycerobas melanozanthos (Hodgson, 1836)	11
White-winged grosbeak	Unknown	LC	Steady		Mycerobas carnipes (Hodgson, 1836)	12
Evening grosbeak	3,400,000	VU	▼		Hesperiphona vespertina (Cooper, W, 1825)	13
Hooded grosbeak	20,000-49,999	LC	▼		Hesperiphona abeillei (Lesson, RP, 1839)	14
Hawfinch	14,600,000-24,200,000	LC	▲		Coccothraustes coccothraustes (Linnaeus, 1758)	15
Chinese grosbeak	Unknown	LC	▼	c. 100-10,000 breeding pairs	Eophona migratoria Hartert, EJO, 1903	16
Japanese grosbeak	Unknown	LC	Steady	c. 100-100,000 breeding pairs	Eophona personata (Temminck & Schlegel, 1847)	17
Pine grosbeak	Unknown	LC	▼		Pinicola enucleator (Linnaeus, 1758)	18
Brown bullfinch	Unknown	LC	Steady	c. 100-100,000 breeding pairs	Pyrrhula nipalensis Hodgson, 1836	19
Orange bullfinch	Unknown	LC	Steady		Pyrrhula aurantiaca Gould, 1858	20
Red-headed bullfinch	Unknown	LC	▼		Pyrrhula erythrocephala Vigors, 1832	21
Grey-headed bullfinch	Unknown	LC	Steady	c. 10,000-100,000 breeding pairs	Pyrrhula erythaca Blyth, 1862	22
Taiwan bullfinch	Unknown	NE	?		Pyrrhula owstoni Rothschild & Hartert, EJO, 1907	23
White-cheeked bullfinch	Unknown	LC	▼		Pyrrhula leucogenis Ogilvie-Grant, 1895	24
Eurasian bullfinch	35,000,000-69,999,999	LC	▼		Pyrrhula pyrrhula (Linnaeus, 1758)	25
Azores bullfinch	500-1,700	VU	Steady		Pyrrhula murina Godman, 1866	26
Crimson-winged finch	535,000-2,060,000	LC	?		Rhodopechys sanguineus (Gould, 1838)	27
Trumpeter finch	Unknown	LC	?		Bucanetes githagineus (Lichtenstein, MHC, 1823)	28
Mongolian finch	Unknown	LC	Steady		Bucanetes mongolicus (Swinhoe, 1870)	29
Blanford's rosefinch	Unknown	LC	▼		Agraphospiza rubescens (Blanford, 1872)	30
Spectacled finch	Unknown	LC	Steady		Callacanthis burtoni (Gould, 1838)	31
Golden-naped finch	Unknown	LC	Steady		Pyrrhoplectes epauletta (Hodgson, 1836)	32
Dark-breasted rosefinch	Unknown	LC	Steady		Procarduelis nipalensis (Hodgson, 1836)	33
Plain mountain finch	Unknown	LC	Steady		Leucosticte nemoricola (Hodgson, 1836)	34
Brandt's mountain finch	Unknown	LC	Steady		Leucosticte brandti Bonaparte, 1850	35
Asian rosy finch	Unknown	LC	▼	c. 100-10,000 breeding pairs	Leucosticte arctoa (Pallas, 1811)	36
Grey-crowned rosy finch	Unknown	LC	Steady	c. 100-10,000 breeding pairs	Leucosticte tephrocotis (Swainson, 1832)	37
Black rosy finch	10,000-19,999	EN	▼		Leucosticte atrata Ridgway, 1874	38
Brown-capped rosy finch	45,000	EN	▼		Leucosticte australis Ridgway, 1874	39
Common rosefinch	27,300,000-56,000,000	LC	▼		Carpodacus erythrinus (Pallas, 1770)	40
Scarlet finch	Unknown	LC	▼		Carpodacus sipahi (Hodgson, 1836)	41
Bonin grosbeak	0	EX	Unspecified	Last seen in 1828	Carpodacus ferreorostris (Vigors, 1829)	42
Streaked rosefinch	Unknown	LC	Steady		Carpodacus rubicilloides Przevalski, 1876	43
Great rosefinch	Unknown	LC	Steady		Carpodacus rubicilla (Güldenstädt, 1775)	44
Blyth's rosefinch	Unknown	NE	?		Carpodacus grandis Blyth, 1849	45
Red-mantled rosefinch	Unknown	LC	Steady		Carpodacus rhodochlamys (Brandt, JF, 1843)	46
Himalayan beautiful rosefinch	Unknown	LC			Carpodacus pulcherrimus (Moore, F, 1856)	47
Chinese beautiful rosefinch	Unknown	NE			Carpodacus davidianus Milne-Edwards, 1865	48
Pink-rumped rosefinch	Unknown	LC			Carpodacus waltoni (Sharpe, 1905)	49
Pink-browed rosefinch	Unknown	LC			Carpodacus rodochroa (Vigors, 1831)	50
Dark-rumped rosefinch	Unknown	LC			Carpodacus edwardsii Verreaux, J, 1871	51
Spot-winged rosefinch	Unknown	LC			Carpodacus rodopeplus (Vigors, 1831)	52
Sharpe's rosefinch	Unknown	LC			Carpodacus verreauxii (David, A & Oustalet, 1877)	53
Vinaceous rosefinch	Unknown	LC			Carpodacus vinaceus Verreaux, J, 1871	54
Taiwan rosefinch	Unknown	LC		c. 10,000-100,000 breeding pairs	Carpodacus formosanus Ogilvie-Grant, 1911	55
Sinai rosefinch	Unknown	LC			Carpodacus synoicus (Temminck, 1825)	56
Pale rosefinch	Unknown	LC			Carpodacus stoliczkae (Hume, 1874)	57
Tibetan rosefinch	Unknown	LC			Carpodacus roborowskii (Przevalski, 1887)	58
Sillem's rosefinch	Unknown	DD			Carpodacus sillemi (Roselaar, 1992)	59
Siberian long-tailed rosefinch	Unknown	LC			Carpodacus sibiricus (Pallas, 1773)	60
Chinese long-tailed rosefinch	Unknown	LC			Carpodacus lepidus (David, A & Oustalet, 1877)	61
Pallas's rosefinch	Unknown	LC			Carpodacus roseus (Pallas, 1776)	62
Three-banded rosefinch	Unknown	LC			Carpodacus trifasciatus Verreaux, J, 1871	63
Himalayan white-browed rosefinch	Unknown	LC			Carpodacus thura Bonaparte & Schlegel, 1850	64
Chinese white-browed rosefinch	Unknown	LC			Carpodacus dubius Przevalski, 1876	65
Red-fronted rosefinch	Unknown	LC			Carpodacus puniceus (Blyth, 1845)	66
Crimson-browed finch	Unknown	LC			Carpodacus subhimachalus (Hodgson, 1836)	67
Poo-uli	0	EX		Last seen in 2004	Melamprosops phaeosoma Casey & Jacobi, JD, 1974	68
Oahu alauahio	1-7	CR			Paroreomyza maculata (Cabanis, 1851)	69
Kakawahie	0	EX		Last seen in 1963	Paroreomyza flammea (Wilson, SB, 1890)	70
Maui alauahio	60,000-70,000	EN			Paroreomyza montana (Wilson, SB, 1890)	71
Akikiki	150-610	CR			Oreomystis bairdi (Stejneger, 1887)	72
Laysan finch	1,500-7,000	VU			Telespiza cantans Wilson, SB, 1890	73
Nihoa finch	2,400-3,600	CR			Telespiza ultima Bryan, 1917	74
Palila	800-1,200 (estimated 970)	CR			Loxioides bailleui Oustalet, 1877	75
Lesser koa finch	0	EX		Last seen in 1891	Rhodacanthis flaviceps Rothschild, 1892	76
Greater koa finch	0	EX		Last seen in 1896	Rhodacanthis palmeri Rothschild, 1892	77
Kona grosbeak	0	EX		Last seen in 1894	Chloridops kona Wilson, SB, 1888	78
Ou	1-49	CR			Psittirostra psittacea (Gmelin, JF, 1789)	79
Lanai hookbill	0	EX		Last seen in 1920	Dysmorodrepanis munroi Perkins, 1919	80
Iiwi	250,000-500,000	VU			Drepanis coccinea (Forster, G, 1780)	81
Hawaii mamo	0	EX		Last seen in 1898	Drepanis pacifica (Gmelin, JF, 1788)	82
Black mamo	0	EX		Last seen in 1907	Drepanis funerea Newton, A, 1894	83
Ula-ai-hawane	0	EX		Last seen in 1937	Ciridops anna (Dole, 1878)	84
Akohekohe	1,100-2,500	CR			Palmeria dolei (Wilson, SB, 1891)	85
Apapane	700,000-1,100,000	LC			Himatione sanguinea (Gmelin, JF, 1788)	86
Laysan honeycreeper	0	EX		Last seen in 1923	Himatione fraithii Rothschild, 1892	87
Greater amakihi	0	EX		Last seen in 1901	Viridonia sagittirostris Rothschild, 1892	88
Lesser akialoa	0	EX		Last seen in 1940	Akialoa obscura (Gmelin, JF, 1788)	89
Oahu akialoa	0	EX		Last seen in 1837	Akialoa ellisiana (Gray, GR, 1860)	90
Kauai akialoa	0	EX		Last seen in 1969	Akialoa stejnegeri (Wilson, SB, 1889)	91
Maui-nui akialoa	0	EX		Last seen in 1892	Akialoa lanaiensis (Rothschild, 1893)	92
Oahu nukupuu	0	EX		Last seen in 1899	Hemignathus lucidus Lichtenstein, MHC, 1839	93
Kauai nukupuu	1-49	CR			Hemignathus hanapepe Wilson, SB, 1889	94
Maui nukupuu	1-49	CR			Hemignathus affinis Rothschild, 1893	95
Akiapolaau	1,300	EN			Hemignathus wilsoni (Rothschild, 1893)	96
Maui parrotbill	105	CR			Pseudonestor xanthophrys Rothschild, 1893	97
Anianiau	3,000-5,000	EN			Magumma parva (Stejneger, 1887)	98
Hawaii creeper	9,300	EN			Manucerthia mana (Wilson, SB, 1891)	990
Akekee	310-1,000	CR			Loxops caeruleirostris (Wilson, SB, 1890)	100
Hawaii akepa	10,800	EN			Loxops coccineus (Gmelin, JF, 1789)	101
Oahu akepa	0	EX		Last seen in 1930	Loxops wolstenholmei Rothschild, 1893	102
Maui akepa	1-49	CR			Loxops ochraceus Rothschild, 1893	103
Hawaii amakihi	400,000-800,000	LC			Chlorodrepanis virens (Gmelin, JF, 1788)	104
Oahu amakihi	30,000-40,000	NT			Chlorodrepanis flava (Bloxam, A, 1827)	105
Kauai amakihi	2,200-4,400	EN			Chlorodrepanis stejnegeri (Wilson, SB, 1890)	106
Purple finch	Unknown	LC			Haemorhous purpureus (Gmelin, JF, 1789)	107
Cassin's finch	3,000,000	LC			Haemorhous cassinii (Baird, SF, 1854)	108
House finch	Unknown	LC			Haemorhous mexicanus (Müller, PLS, 1776)	109
European greenfinch	48,000,000-74,000,000	LC			Chloris chloris (Linnaeus, 1758)	110
Oriental greenfinch	Unknown	LC		c. 10,000-100,000 breeding pairs	Chloris sinica (Linnaeus, 1766)	111
Bonin greenfinch	Unknown	NE			Chloris kittlitzi (Seebohm, 1890)	112
Yellow-breasted greenfinch	Unknown	LC			Chloris spinoides (Vigors, 1831)	113
Vietnamese greenfinch	Unknown	LC			Chloris monguilloti (Delacour, 1926)	114
Black-headed greenfinch	Unknown	LC			Chloris ambigua (Oustalet, 1896)	115
Desert finch	6,100-12,400 (estimated 8,700)	LC		Population is Europe Only	Rhodospiza obsoleta (Lichtenstein, MHC, 1823)	116
Socotra golden-winged grosbeak	6,500	LC			Rhynchostruthus socotranus Sclater, PL & Hartlaub, 1881	117
Arabian golden-winged grosbeak	6,000	NT			Rhynchostruthus percivali Ogilvie-Grant, 1900	118
Somali golden-winged grosbeak	2,500-9,999	NT			Rhynchostruthus louisae Lort Phillips, 1897	119
Oriole finch	Unknown	LC			Linurgus olivaceus (Fraser, 1843)	120
Principe seedeater	Unknown	LC			Crithagra rufobrunnea (Gray, GR, 1862)	121
Sao Tome grosbeak	50-249	CR			Crithagra concolor (Barboza du Bocage, 1888)	122
African citril	Unknown	LC			Crithagra citrinelloides (Rüppell, 1840)	123
Western citril	Unknown	LC			Crithagra frontalis (Reichenow, 1904)	124
Southern citril	Unknown	LC			Crithagra hyposticta (Reichenow, 1904)	125
Black-faced canary	Unknown	LC			Crithagra capistrata Finsch, 1870	126
Papyrus canary	Unknown	LC			Crithagra koliensis (Grant, CHB & Mackworth-Praed, 1952)	127
Forest canary	Unknown	LC			Crithagra scotops Sundevall, 1850	128
White-rumped seedeater	Unknown	LC			Crithagra leucopygia Sundevall, 1850	129
Black-throated canary	Unknown	LC			Crithagra atrogularis (Smith, A, 1836)	130
Yellow-rumped seedeater	Unknown	LC			Crithagra xanthopygia (Rüppell, 1840)	131
Reichenow's seedeater	Unknown	LC			Crithagra reichenowi (Salvadori, 1888)	132
Arabian serin	Unknown	LC			Crithagra rothschildi (Ogilvie-Grant, 1902)	133
Yellow-throated seedeater	250-999	EN			Crithagra flavigula (Salvadori, 1888)	134
Salvadori's seedeater	2,500-9,999	NT			Crithagra xantholaema (Salvadori, 1896)	135
Lemon-breasted canary	Unknown	LC			Crithagra citrinipectus (Clancey & Lawson, 1960)	136
Yellow-fronted canary	Unknown	LC			Crithagra mozambica (Müller, PLS, 1776)	137
White-bellied canary	Unknown	LC			Crithagra dorsostriata Reichenow, 1887	138
Ankober serin	6,000-15,000	VU			Crithagra ankoberensis (Ash, 1979)	139
Yemen serin					Crithagra menachensis (Ogilvie-Grant, 1913)	140
Cape siskin					Crithagra totta (Sparrman, 1786)	141
Drakensberg siskin					Crithagra symonsi (Roberts, 1916)	142
Northern grosbeak-canary					Crithagra donaldsoni (Sharpe, 1895)	143
Southern grosbeak-canary					Crithagra buchanani (Hartert, EJO, 1919)	144
Yellow canary					Crithagra flaviventris (Gmelin, JF, 1789)	145
Brimstone canary					Crithagra sulphurata (Linnaeus, 1766)	146
Stripe-breasted seedeater					Crithagra striatipectus (Sharpe, 1891)	147
Reichard's seedeater					Crithagra reichardi (Reichenow, 1882)	148
Streaky-headed seedeater					Crithagra gularis (Smith, A, 1836)	149
West African seedeater					Crithagra canicapilla (Du Bus de Gisignies, 1855)	150
Black-eared seedeater					Crithagra mennelli (Chubb, EC, 1908)	151
Brown-rumped seedeater					Crithagra tristriata (Rüppell, 1840)	152
White-throated canary					Crithagra albogularis Smith, A, 1833	153
Thick-billed seedeater					Crithagra burtoni (Gray, GR, 1862)	154
Streaky seedeater					Crithagra striolata (Rüppell, 1840)	155
Yellow-browed seedeater					Crithagra whytii (Shelley, 1897)	156
Kipengere seedeater					Crithagra melanochroa (Reichenow, 1900)	157
Protea canary					Crithagra leucoptera Sharpe, 1871	158
Twite					Linaria flavirostris (Linnaeus, 1758)	159
Common linnet					Linaria cannabina (Linnaeus, 1758)	160
Yemen linnet					Linaria yemenensis (Ogilvie-Grant, 1913)	161
Warsangli linnet					Linaria johannis (Clarke, S, 1919)	162
Redpoll					Acanthis flammea (Linnaeus, 1758)	163
Parrot crossbill					Loxia pytyopsittacus Borkhausen, 1793	164
Scottish crossbill					Loxia scotica Hartert, EJO, 1904	165
Red crossbill					Loxia curvirostra Linnaeus, 1758	166
Cassia crossbill					Loxia sinesciuris Benkman, 2009	167
Two-barred crossbill					Loxia leucoptera Gmelin, JF, 1789	168
Hispaniolan crossbill					Loxia megaplaga Riley, 1916	169
Indonesian serin					Chrysocorythus estherae (Finsch, 1902)	170
Mindanao serin					Chrysocorythus mindanensis (Ripley & Rabor, 1961)	171
European goldfinch					Carduelis carduelis (Linnaeus, 1758)	172
Grey-crowned goldfinch					Carduelis caniceps (Vigors, 1831)	173
Citril finch					Carduelis citrinella (Pallas, 1764)	174
Corsican finch					Carduelis corsicana (Koenig, AF, 1899)	175
Red-fronted serin					Serinus pusillus (Pallas, 1811)	176
European serin					Serinus serinus (Linnaeus, 1766)	177
Syrian serin					Serinus syriacus Bonaparte, 1850	178
Atlantic canary					Serinus canaria (Linnaeus, 1758)	179
Cape canary					Serinus canicollis (Swainson, 1838)	180
Yellow-crowned canary					Serinus flavivertex (Blanford, 1869)	181
Ethiopian siskin					Serinus nigriceps Rüppell, 1840	182
Black-headed canary					Serinus alario (Linnaeus, 1758)	183
Tibetan serin					Spinus thibetanus (Hume, 1872)	184
Lawrence's goldfinch					Spinus lawrencei (Cassin, 1850)	185
American goldfinch					Spinus tristis (Linnaeus, 1758)	186
Lesser goldfinch					Spinus psaltria (Say, 1822)	187
Eurasian siskin					Spinus spinus (Linnaeus, 1758)	188
Antillean siskin					Spinus dominicensis (Bryant, H, 1867)	189
Pine siskin					Spinus pinus (Wilson, A, 1810)	190
Black-capped siskin					Spinus atriceps (Salvin, 1863)	191
Black-headed siskin					Spinus notatus (Du Bus de Gisignies, 1847)	192
Black-chinned siskin					Spinus barbatus (Molina, 1782)	193
Yellow-bellied siskin					Spinus xanthogastrus (Du Bus de Gisignies, 1855)	194
Olivaceous siskin					Spinus olivaceus Berlepsch & Stolzmann, 1894	195
Hooded siskin					Spinus magellanicus (Vieillot, 1805)	196
Saffron siskin					Spinus siemiradzkii (Berlepsch & Taczanowski, 1884)	197
Yellow-faced siskin					Spinus yarrellii (Audubon, 1839)	198
Red siskin					Spinus cucullatus (Swainson, 1820)	199
Black siskin					Spinus atratus (d'Orbigny & Lafresnaye, 1837)	200
Yellow-rumped siskin					Spinus uropygialis (Sclater, PL, 1862)	201
Thick-billed siskin					Spinus crassirostris (Landbeck, 1877)	202
Andean siskin					Spinus spinescens (Bonaparte, 1850)	203
Elegant euphonia					Chlorophonia elegantissima (Bonaparte, 1838)	204
Hispaniolan euphonia					Chlorophonia musica (Gmelin, JF, 1789)	205
Puerto Rican euphonia					Chlorophonia sclateri (Sclater, PL, 1854)	206
Lesser Antillean euphonia					Chlorophonia flavifrons (Sparrman, 1789)	207
Golden-rumped euphonia					Chlorophonia cyanocephala (Vieillot, 1819)	208
Blue-naped chlorophonia					Chlorophonia cyanea (Thunberg, 1822)	209
Chestnut-breasted chlorophonia					Chlorophonia pyrrhophrys (Sclater, PL, 1851)	210
Yellow-collared chlorophonia					Chlorophonia flavirostris Sclater, PL, 1861	211
Blue-crowned chlorophonia					Chlorophonia occipitalis (Du Bus de Gisignies, 1847)	212
Golden-browed chlorophonia					Chlorophonia callophrys (Cabanis, 1861)	213
Jamaican euphonia					Euphonia jamaica (Linnaeus, 1766)	214
Orange-crowned euphonia					Euphonia saturata (Cabanis, 1861)	215
Plumbeous euphonia					Euphonia plumbea Du Bus de Gisignies, 1855	216
Purple-throated euphonia					Euphonia chlorotica (Linnaeus, 1766)	217
Finsch's euphonia					Euphonia finschi Sclater, PL & Salvin, 1877	218
Velvet-fronted euphonia					Euphonia concinna Sclater, PL, 1855	219
Trinidad euphonia					Euphonia trinitatis Strickland, 1851	220
West Mexican euphonia					Euphonia godmani Brewster, 1889	221
Scrub euphonia					Euphonia affinis (Lesson, RP, 1842)	222
Yellow-crowned euphonia					Euphonia luteicapilla (Cabanis, 1861)	223
White-lored euphonia					Euphonia chrysopasta Sclater, PL & Salvin, 1869	224
White-vented euphonia					Euphonia minuta Cabanis, 1849	225
Green-chinned euphonia					Euphonia chalybea (Mikan, 1825)	226
Violaceous euphonia					Euphonia violacea (Linnaeus, 1758)	227
Yellow-throated euphonia					Euphonia hirundinacea Bonaparte, 1838	228
Thick-billed euphonia					Euphonia laniirostris d'Orbigny & Lafresnaye, 1837	229
Spot-crowned euphonia					Euphonia imitans (Hellmayr, 1936)	230
Olive-backed euphonia					Euphonia gouldi Sclater, PL, 1857	231
Fulvous-vented euphonia					Euphonia fulvicrissa Sclater, PL, 1857	232
Tawny-capped euphonia					Euphonia anneae Cassin, 1865	233
Orange-bellied euphonia					Euphonia xanthogaster Sundevall, 1834	234
Bronze-green euphonia					Euphonia mesochrysa Salvadori, 1873	235
Golden-sided euphonia					Euphonia cayennensis (Gmelin, JF, 1789)	236
Rufous-bellied euphonia					Euphonia rufiventris (Vieillot, 1819)	237
Chestnut-bellied euphonia					Euphonia pectoralis (Latham, 1801)	238
