= Beautiful rosefinch =

The beautiful rosefinch has been split into two species:

- Himalayan beautiful rosefinch (Carpodacus pulcherrimus)
- Chinese beautiful rosefinch (Carpodacus davidianus)
