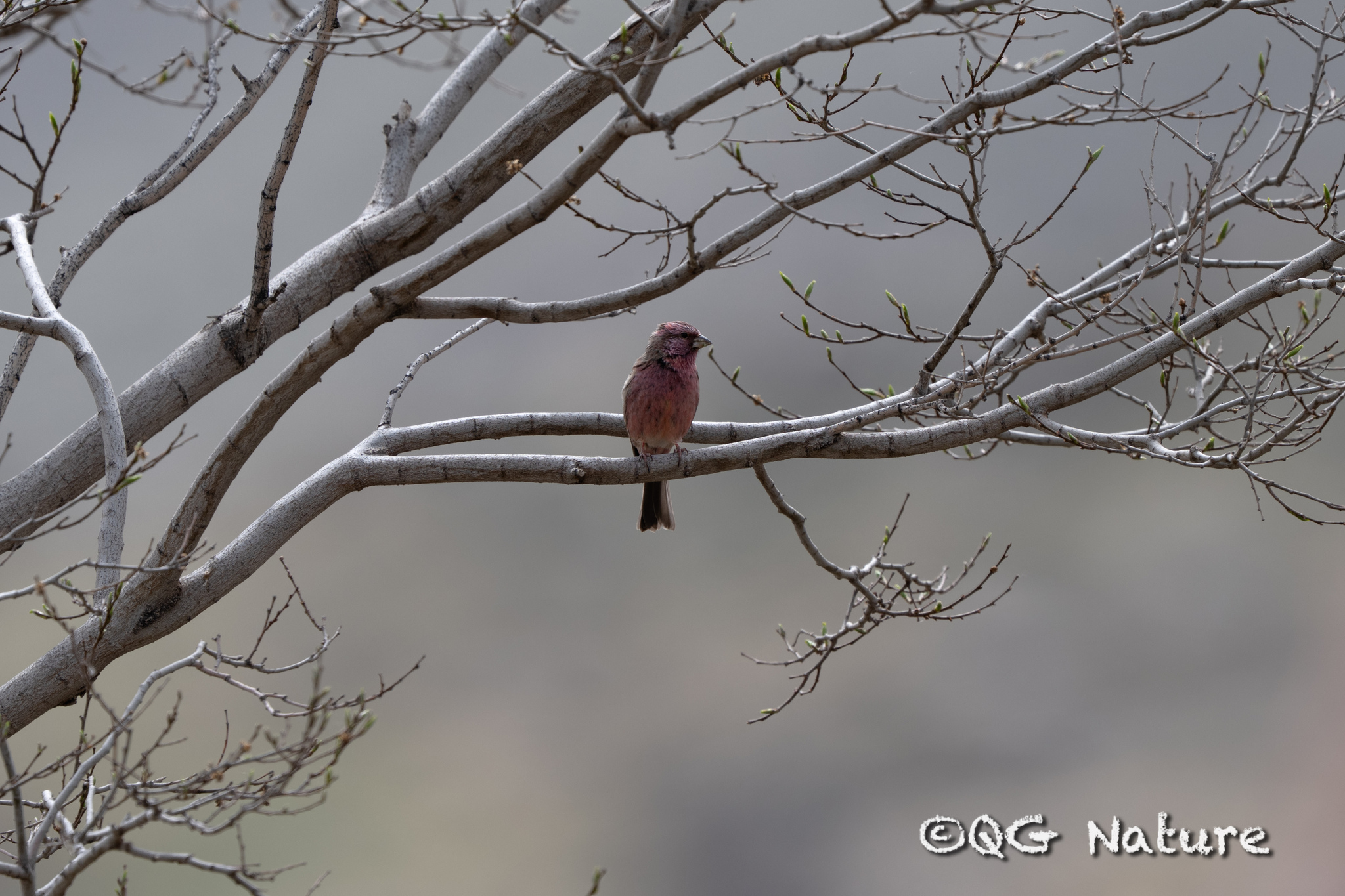

Scientific classification
- Kingdom: Animalia
- Phylum: Chordata
- Class: Aves
- Order: Passeriformes
- Family: Fringillidae
- Subfamily: Carduelinae
- Genus: Carpodacus
- Species: C. davidianus

Binomial name
- Carpodacus davidianus Milne-Edwards, 1865

= Chinese beautiful rosefinch =

Species of bird

The Chinese beautiful rosefinch (Carpodacus davidianus) is a true finch species (family Fringillidae). It is one of the rosefinches that might belong in the genus Propasser. It is found in China and Mongolia. Its natural habitats are temperate shrubland and subtropical or tropical high-altitude shrubland.

== Taxonomy ==
The Chinese beautiful rosefinch, Himalayan beautiful rosefinch and a subspecies of pink-rumped rosefinch (C. w. waltoni) were considered conspecific, called "beautiful rosefinch" (C. pulcherrimus). While the phylogenetic relationship among rosefinches was reconstructed in a 2013 study, two mitochondrial genes and two nuclear genes were used. It revealed that C. p. waltoni is closer to C. eos, and has now been merged into the same species, pink-rumped rosefinch, and its scientific name changed to C. waltoni. While the Chinese beautiful rosefinch and Himalayan beautiful rosefinch were split into two different species, the former was named C. davidianus, and the latter has the scientific name C. pulcherrimus of "beautiful rosefinch". After the taxonomic revision, the Chinese beautiful rosefinch is a monotypic species.
