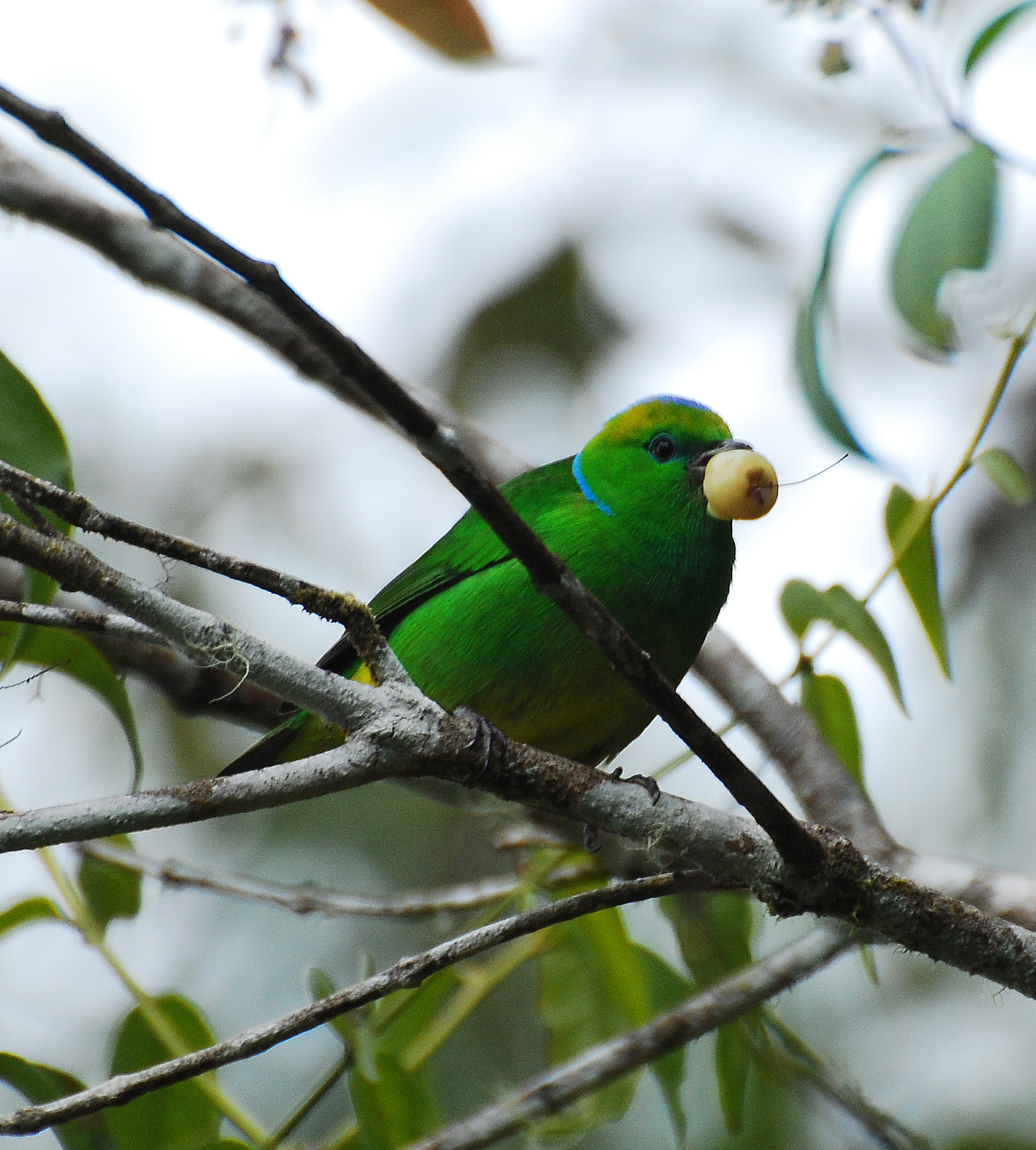
- Golden-browed chlorophonia (Chlorophonia callophrys)

Scientific classification
- Kingdom: Animalia
- Phylum: Chordata
- Class: Aves
- Order: Passeriformes
- Family: Fringillidae
- Subfamily: Euphoniinae
- Genus: Chlorophonia; Bonaparte, 1851

Type species
- Tanagra viridis = Pipra cyanea Vieillot, 1819

= Chlorophonia =

Genus of birds

Chlorophonia is a genus of finches in the family Fringillidae. The chlorophonias are endemic to the Neotropics. They are small, mostly bright green birds that inhabit humid forests and nearby habitats, especially in highlands.

== Taxonomy ==
The genus Chlorophonia was erected in 1851 by the French ornithologist Charles Lucien Bonaparte. The name combines the Ancient Greek χλωρός (khlōrós), meaning "green", with the genus name Euphonia that had been introduced in 1806 by the French zoologist Anselme Gaëtan Desmarest. The type species was designated as the blue-naped chlorophonia (Chlorophonia cyanea) by the English zoologist George Robert Gray in 1855. The genus was once considered as a member of the tanager family, Thraupidae.

== Species ==
The genus contains the following ten species:

Image	Common name	Scientific name	Distribution
	Elegant euphonia	Chlorophonia elegantissima	Belize, Costa Rica, El Salvador, Guatemala, Honduras, Mexico, Nicaragua, and Panama.
	Hispaniolan euphonia	Chlorophonia musica	Hispaniola (Dominican Republic and Haiti)
	Puerto Rican euphonia	Chlorophonia sclateri	Puerto Rico
	Lesser Antillean euphonia	Chlorophonia flavifrons	Lesser Antilles
	Golden-rumped euphonia	Chlorophonia cyanocephala	Argentina, Bolivia, Brazil, Colombia, Ecuador, French Guiana, Guyana, Paraguay, Peru, Suriname, Trinidad and Tobago, and Venezuela.
	Blue-naped chlorophonia	Chlorophonia cyanea	south-eastern Brazil, eastern Paraguay and north-eastern Argentina, the Andes from Bolivia in south to Venezuela in north, the Perijá and Santa Marta Mountains, the Venezuelan Coastal Range, and the Tepuis.
	Chestnut-breasted chlorophonia	Chlorophonia pyrrhophrys	Colombia, Ecuador, Peru, and Venezuela.
	Yellow-collared chlorophonia	Chlorophonia flavirostris	Colombia, Ecuador, and Panama.
	Blue-crowned chlorophonia	Chlorophonia occipitalis	El Salvador, Panama, Guatemala, Honduras, Mexico, and Nicaragua.
	Golden-browed chlorophonia	Chlorophonia callophrys	Costa Rica and Panama.
