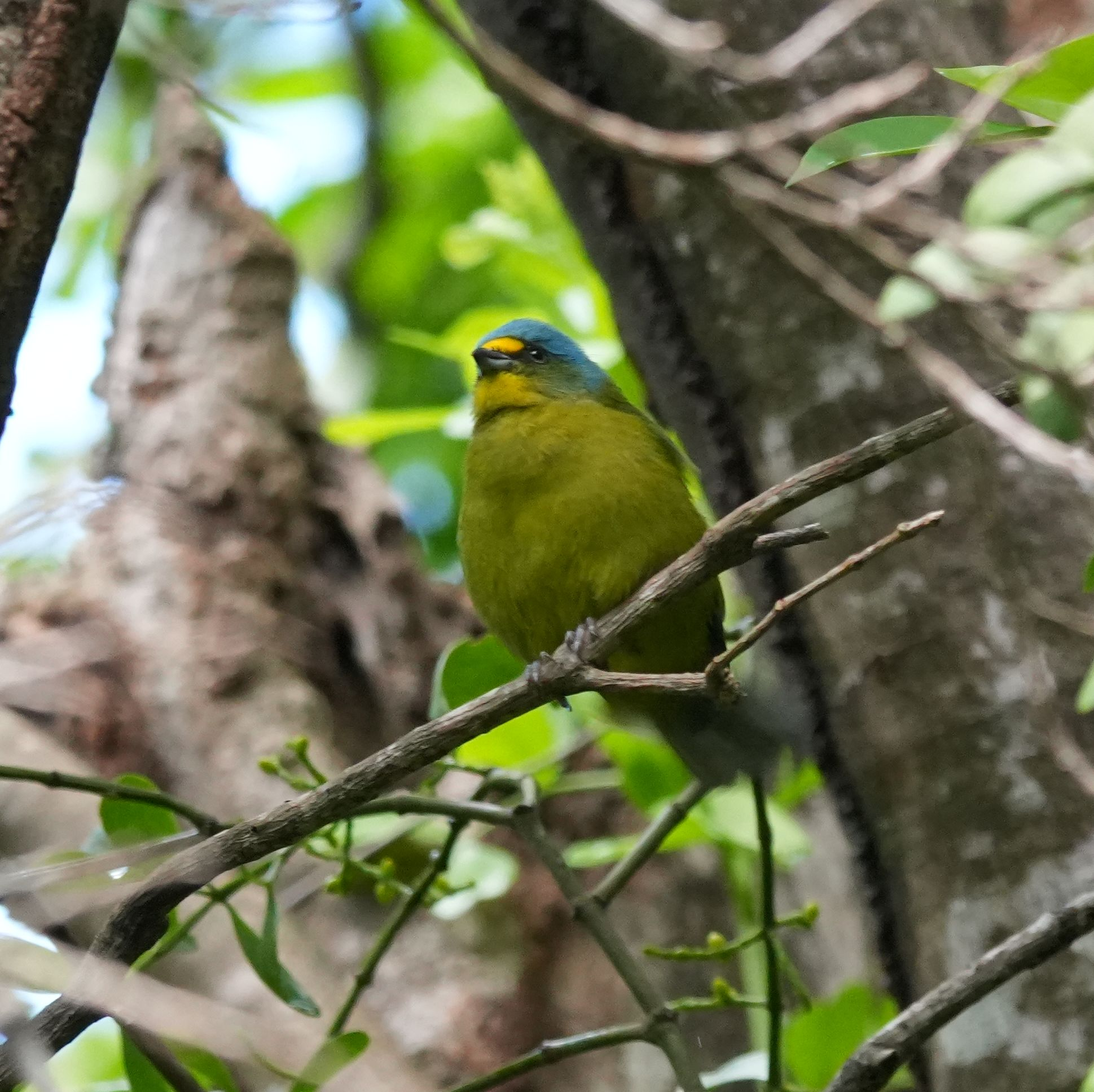

Conservation status
- Least Concern (IUCN 3.1)

Scientific classification
- Kingdom: Animalia
- Phylum: Chordata
- Class: Aves
- Order: Passeriformes
- Family: Fringillidae
- Subfamily: Euphoniinae
- Genus: Chlorophonia
- Species: C. flavifrons

Binomial name
- Chlorophonia flavifrons (Sparrman, 1789)

Synonyms
- See text

= Lesser Antillean euphonia =

Species of bird

The Lesser Antillean euphonia (Chlorophonia flavifrons) is a species of bird in the family Fringillidae, the finches and euphonias. It is endemic to the Lesser Antilles.

== Taxonomy and systematics ==
The Lesser Antillean euphonia has a complicated taxonomic history. It was originally described with the binomial Emberiza flavifrons. For the rest of the eighteenth and nineteenth centuries and into the twentieth it was treated as a full species. In much of the twentieth century it and several other euphonias were treated as subspecies of what was then the "blue-hooded euphonia" (Euphonia elegantissima sensu lato). By 1998 the blue-hooded euphonia was split into three species with what is now the Lesser Antillean euphonia treated as a subspecies of the "Antillean euphonia" (Euphonia musica sensu lato). Following further studies, in the early 2020s those three species were reassigned by most taxonomic systems to their present genus Chlorophonia that had been erected in 1851. However, BirdLife International's Handbook of the Birds of the World retained them in Euphonia.

Genera Euphonia and Chlorophonia were long placed in the family Thraupidae, the "true" tanagers. Multiple studies in the late twentieth and early twenty-first centuries resulted in their being reassigned to their present place in the family Fringillidae.

Beginning in 2016 the Antillean euphonia was split into the Hispaniolan euphonia (C. musica sensu stricto), the Puerto Rican euphonia (C. sclateri), and the Lesser Antillean euphonia (C. flavifrons) and the splits were widely adopted by 2023.

The Lesser Antillean euphonia is monotypic.

== Description ==
The Lesser Antillean euphonia is about 10 to 12 cm (3.9 to 4.7 in) long and weighs about 13 to 16 g (0.46 to 0.56 oz). The sexes have the same plumage. Adults have a yellow forehead that is separated from the forecrown by a narrow black strip. Their crown and nape are sky blue that extends forward from the latter under the ear coverts. The rest of their head is black. Their upperparts and tail are dark olive green with a yellow wash on the lower back. Their flight feathers are dark olive green with white inner edges. Their underparts are olive-yellow that is darker on the breast than elsewhere. They have a dark brown or grayish brown iris, a black maxilla, a grayish blue mandible with a black tip, and dark gray to black legs and feet with yellow soles.

== Distribution and habitat ==
The Lesser Antillean euphonia is known from these islands in the Lesser Antilles: Barbuda, Antigua, Guadeloupe, Dominica, Martinique, St. Lucia, St. Vincent, and Grenada. It inhabits humid evergreen and deciduous forests and also drier scrubby areas. It especially favors areas heavy with mistletoe (Loranthaceae).

== Behavior ==
=== Movement ===
The Lesser Antillean euphonia is generally considered to be a resident species. However, some movements in elevation and between islands have been suggested.

=== Feeding ===
The Lesser Antillean euphonia feeds on small fruits, almost entirely those of mistletoe. It includes smaller amounts of other fruits in its diet. It forages mostly in pairs and occasionally joins mixed-species feeding flocks.

=== Breeding ===
The Lesser Antillean euphonia's breeding season has not been defined but appears to include April and May on St. Lucia. Its nest is not known in detail but has been described as made from moss and rootlets lined with finer plant fibers. One nest had four eggs that were a slightly glossy white with mauve or reddish brown markings. The incubation period, time to fledging, and details of parental care are not known.

=== Vocalization ===
The Lesser Antillean euphonia's song is "a trilling, tinkling tuc-tuc-tuc..., punctuated with sharp whistles, often in long rambling discourse for up to 20 minutes with little or no pause". Its calls include "a plaintive whistle" often followed by "a soft tuk-tuk, ee-oo-tuk-tuk, or i-i-i-u-u-…..tuk, tuk".

== Status ==
The IUCN has assessed the Lesser Antillean euphonia as being of Least Concern. It has a restricted range; its population size is not known and is believed to be decreasing. No immediate threats have been identified and it does not appear to be trapped for the pet trade. It is considered uncommon throughout its range. It occurs in a few national parks and similar protected areas.
