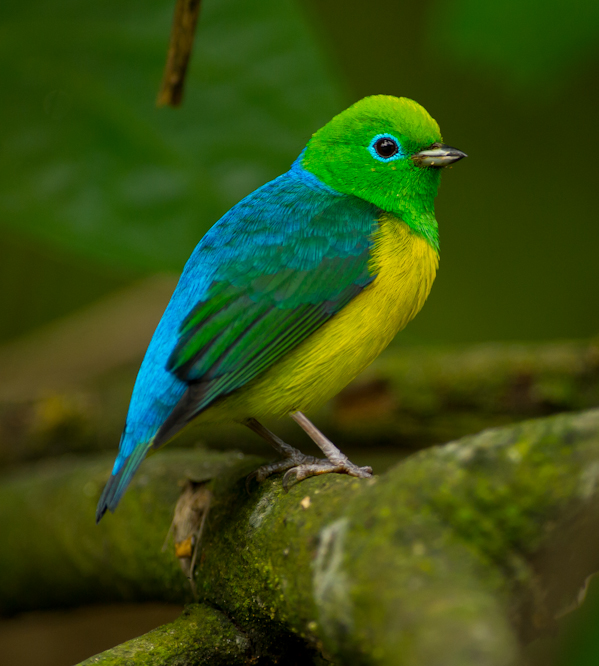
- Male C. c. cyanea in Rio de Janeiro state, Brazil

Conservation status
- Least Concern (IUCN 3.1)

Scientific classification
- Kingdom: Animalia
- Phylum: Chordata
- Class: Aves
- Order: Passeriformes
- Family: Fringillidae
- Subfamily: Euphoniinae
- Genus: Chlorophonia
- Species: C. cyanea

Binomial name
- Chlorophonia cyanea (Thunberg, 1822)

= Blue-naped chlorophonia =

Species of bird

The blue-naped chlorophonia (Chlorophonia cyanea) is a species of bird in the family Fringillidae, the finches and euphonias. It is found in every mainland South American country except Chile, French Guiana, Suriname, and Uruguay.

== Taxonomy and systematics ==
The blue-naped chlorophonia was originally described in 1822 with the binomial Pipra cyanea, mistakenly identifying it as a manakin. It was eventually reassigned to genus Chlorophonia that was erected in 1851.

The genus Chlorophonia was long placed in the family Thraupidae, the "true" tanagers. Multiple studies in the late twentieth and early twenty-first centuries resulted in its being reassigned to its present place in the family Fringillidae.

The blue-naped chlorophonia has these seven subspecies:

- C. c. psittacina Bangs, 1902
- C. c. frontalis (Sclater, PL, 1851)
- C. c. minuscula Hellmayr, 1922
- C. c. roraimae Salvin & Godman, 1884
- C. c. intensa Zimmer, JT, 1943
- C. c. longipennis (Du Bus de Gisignies, 1855)
- C. c. cyanea (Thunberg, 1822)

== Description ==
The blue-naped chlorophonia is a chunky, short-tailed, stubby-billed bird. It is about 11 cm (4.3 in) long and weighs 11 to 15 g (0.39 to 0.53 oz). The species is sexually dimorphic. Adult males of the nominate subspecies C. c. cyanea have a mostly glistening emerald-green head, throat, and chest. They have a turquoise-blue ring around the eye. Their nape and most of their upperparts are blue with a lighter and brighter blue rump. Their tail's upper surface is dusky with green-blue feather edges and its underside is gray. Their flight feathers are dusky with bright green edges. Their breast, belly, and vent are bright yellow. Adult females are duller and plainer than males. Their head, chest, and upperparts are green with the same blue eye-ring as males. They have a thin blue collar on their nape. Their breast and the rest of their underparts are dull greenish yellow.

The other subspecies of the blue-naped chlorophonia differ from the nominate and each other thus:

- C. c. psittacina: male has yellow forehead, blue nape and rump, and green back; female has dull golden-olive underparts
- C. c. frontalis: like psittacina
- C. c. minuscula: like psittacina with slightly duller underparts on male
- C. c. roraimae: mostly like nominate but male has a yellow forehead
- C. c. longipennis: male has darker green head than nomiate with blue nape, mantle, scapulars, back, and rump and brighter yellow underparts; female has darker green head and upperparts
- C. c. intensa: like longipennis but with duller yellow underparts

Both sexes of all subspecies have a dark brown iris, a blackish bill, and dark gray legs and feet.

== Distribution and habitat ==
The blue-naped chlorophonia has a highly disjunct distribution. The subspecies are found thus:

- C. c. psittacina: the isolated Sierra Nevada de Santa Marta in northern Colombia
- C. c. frontalis: Venezuelan Andes in Lara and from central Falcón to Miranda
- C. c. minuscula: mountains in Venezuela's northeastern Anzoátegui, northern Monagas and Sucre states
- C. c. roraimae: tepuis in Venezuela's Amazonas and Bolívar states, western Guyana, and extreme northern Brazil
- C. c. intensa: western slope of Colombia's Western Andes
- C. c. longipennis: Serranía del Perijá on the Venezuela-Colombia border; Venezuelan Andes from Lara south and through the Colombian Andes (except where intensa is) and on the eastern Andean slope through Ecuador and Peru into Bolivia to western Santa Cruz Department; locally in Amazonian Peru
- C. c. cyanea: southeastern Brazil from southern Bahia south to northern Rio Grande do Sul and west into eastern Paraguay and northeastern Argentina's Misiones Province

The blue-naped chlorophonia primarily inhabits the interior, edges, and clearings in humid to wet foothill and montane forest and mature secondary forest. In Venezuela it ranges in elevation between 700 and 2,500 m (2,300 and 8,200 ft) north of the Orinoco River and between 500 and 1,800 m (1,600 and 5,900 ft) south of it. It ranges between 1,000 and 2,200 m (3,300 and 7,200 ft) in Colombia, mostly between 800 and 2,000 m (2,600 and 6,600 ft) in Ecuador, between 900 and 2,100 m (3,000 and 6,900 ft) in Peru, and mostly between 500 and 2,000 m (1,600 and 6,600 ft) in Brazil.

== Behavior ==
=== Movement ===
The blue-naped chlorophonia is primarily a year-round resident but some movements from highlands to lowlands have been noted, especially in Venezuela and Peru.

=== Feeding ===
The blue-naped chlorophonia feeds almost exclusively on fruits but includes some insects in its diet. It appears to favor mistletoe (Loranthaceae) fruits. It takes most fruits by reaching or leaning while perched. It forages in pairs and often in family groups or small flocks of up to about 12 individuals, and usually from the forest's middle to upper levels where it remains inconspicuous.

=== Breeding ===
The blue-naped chlorophonia's breeding seasons have not been fully defined but vary geographically. Its season includes May in the Santa Martas, January to June in western Colombia, and November in Peru and Argentina. The species' nest is a ball made from grasses with a side entrance and is typically placed in a cleft in an earthen bank or cliff. The clutch is three eggs that are white with chestnut markings. The incubation period, time to fledging, and details of parental care are not known.

=== Vocalization ===
The blue-naped chlorophonia's song is "a choppy series of call notes mixed with liquid whistles, short warbles, and piercing notes". Its calls include "a descending, whistled heu or seeu and a nasal, mechanical enk and dit".

== Status ==
The IUCN has assessed the blue-naped chlorophonia as being of Least Concern. It has an extremely large range; its population size is not known and is believed to be decreasing. No immediate threats have been identified. It is sometimes illegally trapped for the pet trade. It is considered "uncommon to fairly common" in Venezuela, "common" in the Santa Martas and "usually uncommon" in the rest of Colombia, "scarce" in Ecuador, "fairly common" in Peru, and "common to frequent" in the middle of its Brazilian range and "frequent to uncommon" in the northern and southern parts of it. It occurs in many protected areas throughout its range.
