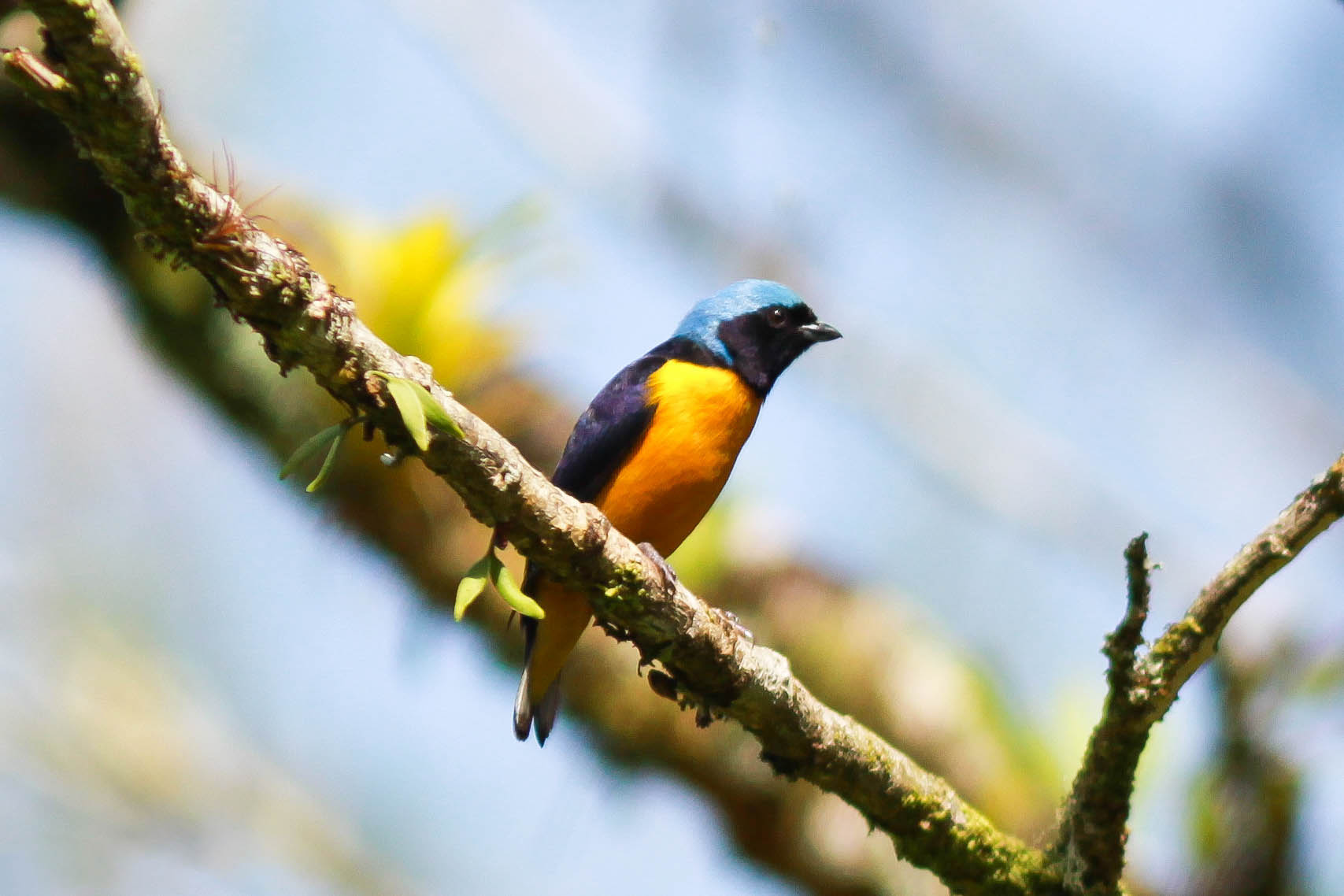

Conservation status
- Least Concern (IUCN 3.1)

Scientific classification
- Kingdom: Animalia
- Phylum: Chordata
- Class: Aves
- Order: Passeriformes
- Family: Fringillidae
- Subfamily: Euphoniinae
- Genus: Chlorophonia
- Species: C. cyanocephala

Binomial name
- Chlorophonia cyanocephala (Vieillot, 1819)

Synonyms
- See text

= Golden-rumped euphonia =

Species of bird

The golden-rumped euphonia (Chlorophonia cyanocephala) is a species of bird in the family Fringillidae, the finches and euphonias. It is found in every mainland South American country except Chile and formerly was also found on Trinidad.

== Taxonomy and systematics ==
The golden-rumped euphonia has a complicated taxonomic history. It was originally described in 1819 with the binomial Pipra cyanocephala, mistakenly identifying it as a manakin. It was eventually reassigned to genus Euphonia that had been erected in 1806.

For a time the golden-rumped euphonia, the elegant euphonia (now C. elegantissima), and the Hispaniolan euphonia (now C. musica) were treated as a single species called the blue-hooded euphonia. They were separated by 1998 and formed a superspecies. Following further studies, in the early 2020s those three species were reassigned by most taxonomic systems to their present genus Chlorophonia that had been erected in 1851. The first version of AviList (2025) also places the golden-rumped euphonia in Chlorophonia. However, as of 2025 BirdLife International's Handbook of the Birds of the World retains it in Euphonia.

Genera Euphonia and Chlorophonia were long placed in the family Thraupidae, the "true" tanagers. Multiple studies in the late twentieth and early twenty-first centuries resulted in their being reassigned to their present place in the family Fringillidae.

The elegant euphonia has these three subspecies:

- C. c. pelzelni (Sclater, PL, 1886)
- C. c. insignis (Sclater, PL & Salvin, 1877)
- C. c. cyanocephala (Vieillot, 1819)

== Description ==
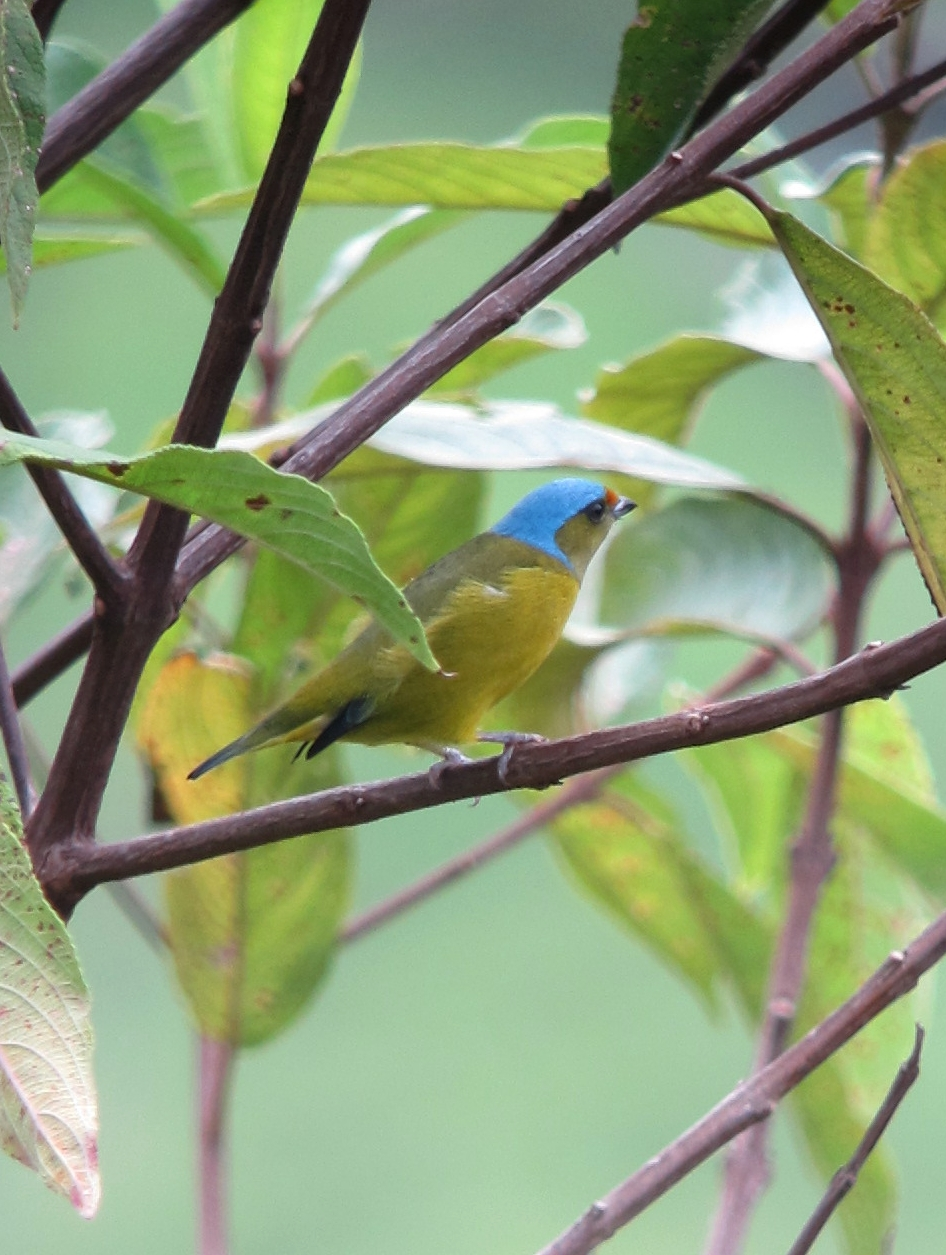
female bird

The golden-rumped euphonia is about 11 cm (4.3 in) long and weighs 15 to 16 g (0.53 to 0.56 oz). The species is sexually dimorphic. Adult males of the nominate subspecies C. c. cyanocephala have a bright turquoise-blue crown and nape whose color extends forward from the nape under the ear coverts. The rest of their face, head, and throat are black. Their mantle, back, and tail are black with a purplish to dark blue gloss. Their lower back and rump are golden-yellow to orange-yellow and their uppertail coverts are blue-black. Their upperwing coverts and their tertials are dusky black with a bluish tinge and the rest of their flight feathers are dark brown to dusky with yellowish olive outer webs and inner edges. Their underparts are deep yellow. Adult females have a tawny to yellowish buff forehead. Their crown and nape are turquoise-blue that curves forward like the male's. The rest of their head is olive-green. Their upperparts are olive-green that is paler and brighter on the rump. Their tail and flight feathers are fuscous with olive-green edges. Their chin, throat, and breast are yellow-olive and their belly and undertail coverts a more olive-yellow. Males of subspecies C. c. pelzelni have a paler rump and underparts than the nominate. C. c. insignis males have an orange-yellow forehead separated from the forecrown by a thin black line. Females have a slightly greener back than the nominate. Both sexes of all subspecies have a dark brown iris, a blackish bill with a blue-gray base to the mandible, and dusky gray legs and feet.

== Distribution and habitat ==
The golden-rumped euphonia has a disjunct distribution. The subspecies are found thus:

- C. c. pelzelni: from southern Colombia south in western Ecuador to Chimborazo Province
- C. c. insignis: eastern slope of Ecuadorian Andes in Azuay and Loja provinces
- C. c. cyanocephala: southeastern Bolívar state in Venezuela and adjoining western Guyana and extreme northern Brazil; the Venezuelan Coastal Range, Serranía del Perijá on the Venezuela-Colombia border; Venezuelan Andes south through the Andes of Colombia and Ecuador into the Marañón River valley in Peru; far southeastern Peru south through Bolivia into northwestern Argentina; and separately from Bahia in eastern Brazil south through southeastern Paraguay and Uruguay into northeastern Argentina

In addition, there are isolated records elsewhere in Brazil, Bolivia, and Argentina in areas not named above. The species previously was found on the island of Tobago but has been extirpated. The South American Classification Committee (SACC) also has records from French Guiana and Suriname.

The golden-rumped euphonia inhabits a variety of somewhat open landscapes including secondary forest, the edges of mature forest, disturbed areas, and shade coffee plantations. In Venezuela it mostly ranges in elevation between 600 and 2,500 m (2,000 and 8,200 ft) north of the Orinoco River and between 500 and 1,500 m (1,600 and 4,900 ft) south of it; it occasionally is found down to sea level. It ranges between 1,200 and 3,000 m (3,900 and 9,800 ft) in Colombia, mostly between 1,200 and 2,800 m (3,900 and 9,200 ft) in Ecuador, mostly between 1,300 and 2,600 m (4,300 and 8,500 ft) and sometimes lower in Peru, and mostly between 500 and 2,800 m (1,600 and 9,200 ft) and sometimes lower in Brazil.

== Behavior ==
=== Movement ===
Most populations of the golden-rumped euphonia are year-round residents, though many individuals make erratic movements that may be tied to food availability. Some movements to lowlands have been noted in Brazil, Ecuador, and Peru. It is present in French Guiana and Paraguay only as non-breeding birds.

=== Feeding ===
The golden-rumped euphonia feeds almost entirely on fruits but is believed to also include insects in its diet. It seems to favor mistletoe (Loranthaceae) berries and is an important disperser of their seeds. It forages in pairs or small groups and only rarely joins mixed-species feeding flocks.

=== Breeding ===
The golden-rumped euphonia's breeding seasons have not been defined. Its season in Venezuela includes January and February and it spans at least December to May in Colombia. Its nest is a side-entrance globe made from grass and moss. Nests have been found hidden on earthen banks, on tree branches, and amid epiphytes on tree trunks. The clutch is two eggs that are cream with light reddish brown and black markings. The incubation period, time to fledging, and details of parental care are not known.

=== Vocalization ===
In Venezuela the golden-rumped euphonia sings "a fast, complex stream of twittery and squeaky notes mixed with low-pitched chup notes" that may last 10 seconds. Its call there is "a soft, whistled cheeer, slightly descending". It song in Peru is similarly described as "a long, rapid series of liquid warbles with occasional squeaks and electric notes punctuated by longer wheezy notes that rise or fall" and its call as "a descending whistle: heu.

== Status ==
The IUCN has assessed the golden-rumped euphonia as being of Least Concern. It has an extremely large range; its population size is not known but is believed to be stable. No immediate threats have been identified. It is considered uncommon to fairly common in Venezuela, "usually uncommon" in Colombia, uncommon in Ecuador, common in Peru, and "uncommon to rare" in the northern have of its eastern Brazil range and "frequent to uncommon" in the southern part of it.
