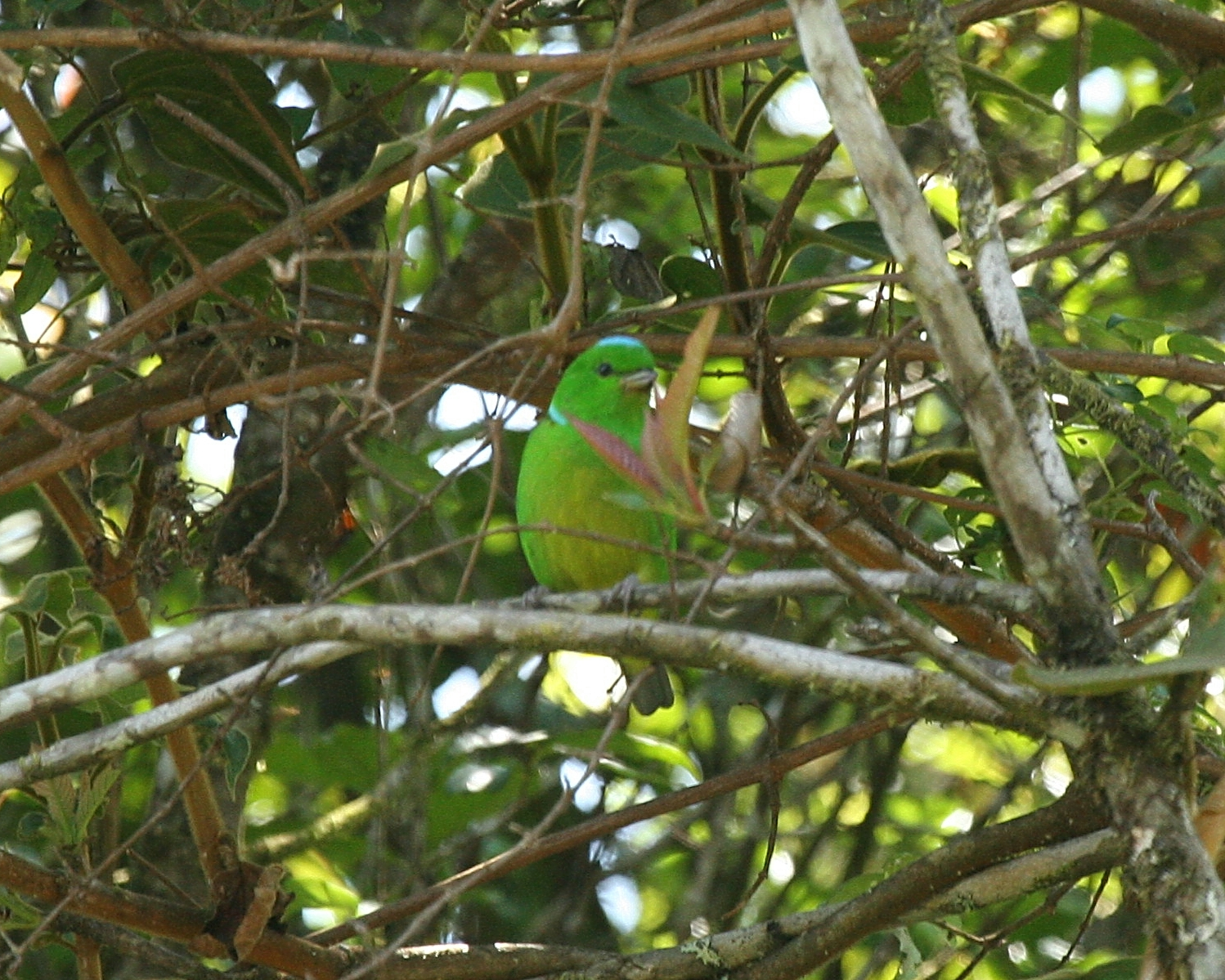

Conservation status
- Least Concern (IUCN 3.1)

Scientific classification
- Kingdom: Animalia
- Phylum: Chordata
- Class: Aves
- Order: Passeriformes
- Family: Fringillidae
- Subfamily: Euphoniinae
- Genus: Chlorophonia
- Species: C. occipitalis

Binomial name
- Chlorophonia occipitalis (Du Bus de Gisignies, 1847)

= Blue-crowned chlorophonia =

Species of bird

The blue-crowned chlorophonia (Chlorophonia occipitalis) is a species of bird in the family Fringillidae, the finches and euphonias. It is found in El Salvador, Guatemala, Honduras, Mexico, and Nicaragua.

== Taxonomy and systematics ==
The blue-crowned chlorophonia was originally described in 1847 with the binomial Euphonia occipitalis. It was eventually reassigned to genus Chlorophonia that had been erected in 1851. The genus Chlorophonia was long placed in the family Thraupidae, the "true" tanagers. Multiple studies in the late twentieth and early twenty-first centuries resulted in its being reassigned to its present place in the family Fringillidae.

The blue-crowned chlorophonia and the golden-browed chlorophonia (C. callophrys) were for a time treated as conspecific and now form a superspecies. The blue-crowned chlorophonia is monotypic.

== Description ==
The blue-crowned chlorophonia is a chunky, short-tailed, stubby-billed bird. It is about 13 cm (5.1 in) long and weighs 25 to 27.5 g (0.88 to 0.97 oz). The species is sexually dimorphic. Adult males have a mostly shiny emerald-green head with a circular turquoise-blue patch in the center of the crown. Their throat and upper breast are the same green. They have a thin turquoise-blue collar under the nape and a thin black and chestnut line under the upper breast. Their upperparts are a slightly darker shiny green than their head. The upper side of their tail is green and the underside gray. Most flight feathers are black with green edges; their tertials are green. Their lower breast, belly, and undertail coverts are bright yellow and their sides and flanks green. Adult females have a smaller turquoise-blue crown patch than males and a light cerulean-blue collar. Their upperparts and tail are shiny green and their wings are like the male's. The center of their breast and belly and their undertail coverts are yellow and the rest of their underparts are green. Both sexes have a light brown to brown iris, a dusky maxilla with a bluish gray base, a bluish gray mandible with a dusky tip, and dark gray legs and feet.

== Distribution and habitat ==
The blue-crowned chlorophonia has a disjunct distribution. It is found in several populations of various sizes from Veracruz in southeastern Mexico south through Guatemala, northern El Salvador, and much of Honduras into north-central Nicaragua. In the breeding season it inhabits montane evergreen forest including cloudforest and pine–oak forest. Outside that season it inhabits lower elevation evergreen and secondary forest and also shady plantations. Sources differ about its elevational range. One states it is from 1,000 to 2,500 m (3,300 to 8,200 ft). Another places it between 500 and 2,500 m (1,600 and 8,200 ft) but mostly between 1,000 and 2,000 m (3,300 and 6,600 ft). A third, which addresses its range outside Mexico, places it between 100 and 2,400 m (300 and 7,900 ft) but below 600 m (2,000 ft) only in winter.

== Behavior ==
=== Movement ===
The blue-crowned chlorophonia is generally considered to be a resident species. However, it is known to wander after breeding and to make some elevational movements between the breeding and non-breeding seasons; the movements are not well defined.

=== Feeding ===
The blue-crowned chlorophonia feeds almost exclusively on fruit but possibly includes insects in its diet. It favors the berries of mistletoe (Loranthaceae) and other small berries. It forages mostly in the forest canopy. During the breeding season it usually forages in pairs. Outside that season it may gather in small flocks of up to about 12 individuals. Though the species may share fruiting trees with other species, if seldom joins mixed-species feeding flocks.

=== Breeding ===
The blue-crowned chlorophonia's breeding season has not been detailed but includes April in Mexico. Both sexes build the nest, a ball or domed structure with a side entrance. It is made from bark, moss, and plant fibers lined with finer fibers and is typically placed in bromeliads or epiphytes. The clutch is three eggs that are white with reddish and gray markings. The incubation period is about 15 days, fledging occurs about 21 days after hatch, and both parents feed nestlings by regurgitation.

=== Vocalization ===
The blue-crowned chlorophonia's calls include "a liquid tinkling where'my'shirt or two'eet! and a nasal wrap". It also makes "a fairly low, mournful whistle, peeeeewwwww". Its song is "a long, rather breezy series of turdle-dee phrases mixed with rougher, lower-pitched chup or dit notes".

== Status ==
The IUCN has assessed the blue-crowned chlorophonia as being of Least Concern. It has a large range, its estimated population of at least 50,000 mature individuals is believed to be decreasing. No immediate threats have been identified. It is considered common to fairly common in Mexico. It is "generally uncommon and local" in the highlands of northern Central America and "a rare winter visitor" below 600 m (2,000 ft). It occurs in national parks or other protected areas in most countries of its range. "The species’ range has decreased because of extensive deforestation within region, but some intact unprotected habitat remains within its existing range."
