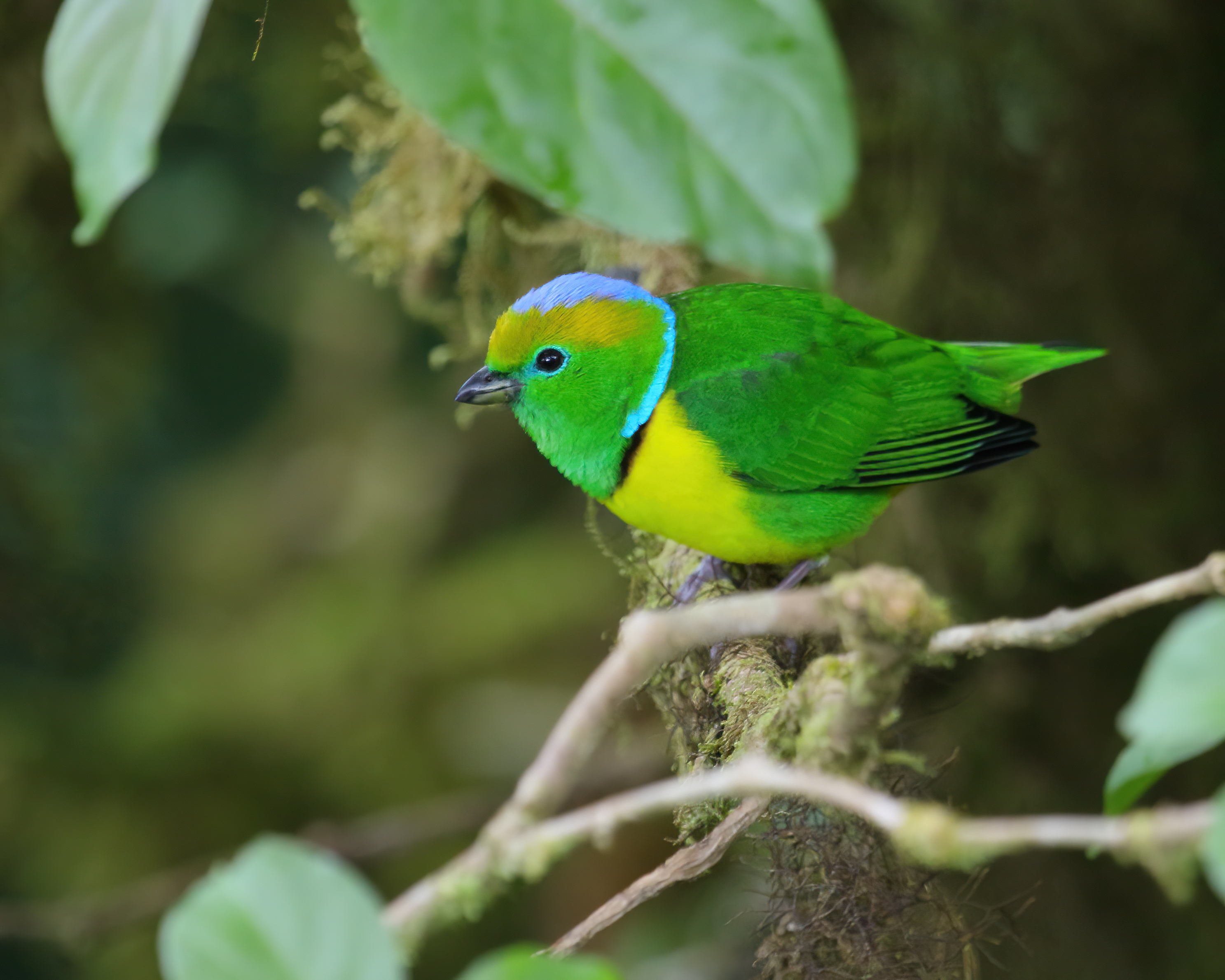

Conservation status
- Least Concern (IUCN 3.1)

Scientific classification
- Kingdom: Animalia
- Phylum: Chordata
- Class: Aves
- Order: Passeriformes
- Family: Fringillidae
- Subfamily: Euphoniinae
- Genus: Chlorophonia
- Species: C. callophrys

Binomial name
- Chlorophonia callophrys (Cabanis, 1861)

= Golden-browed chlorophonia =

Species of bird

The golden-browed chlorophonia (Chlorophonia callophrys) is a species of bird in the family Fringillidae, the finches and euphonias. It is found in Costa Rica and Panama.

== Taxonomy and systematics ==
The golden-browed chlorophonia was originally described by Jean Cabanis in 1861 with the binomial Triglyphidia callophrys. Cabanis stated that the genus Triglyphidia "probably means 'with three small notches' ". (Note: Google translation of "bedeutet wahrscheinlich mit drei kleinen Kerben".)

The golden-browed chlorophonia and the blue-crowned chlorophonia (Chlorophonia occipitalis) were for a time treated as conspecific and now form a superspecies. The genus Chlorophonia was long placed in the family Thraupidae, the "true" tanagers. Multiple studies in the late twentieth and early twenty-first centuries resulted in its being reassigned to its present place in the family Fringillidae.

The golden-browed chlorophonia is monotypic.

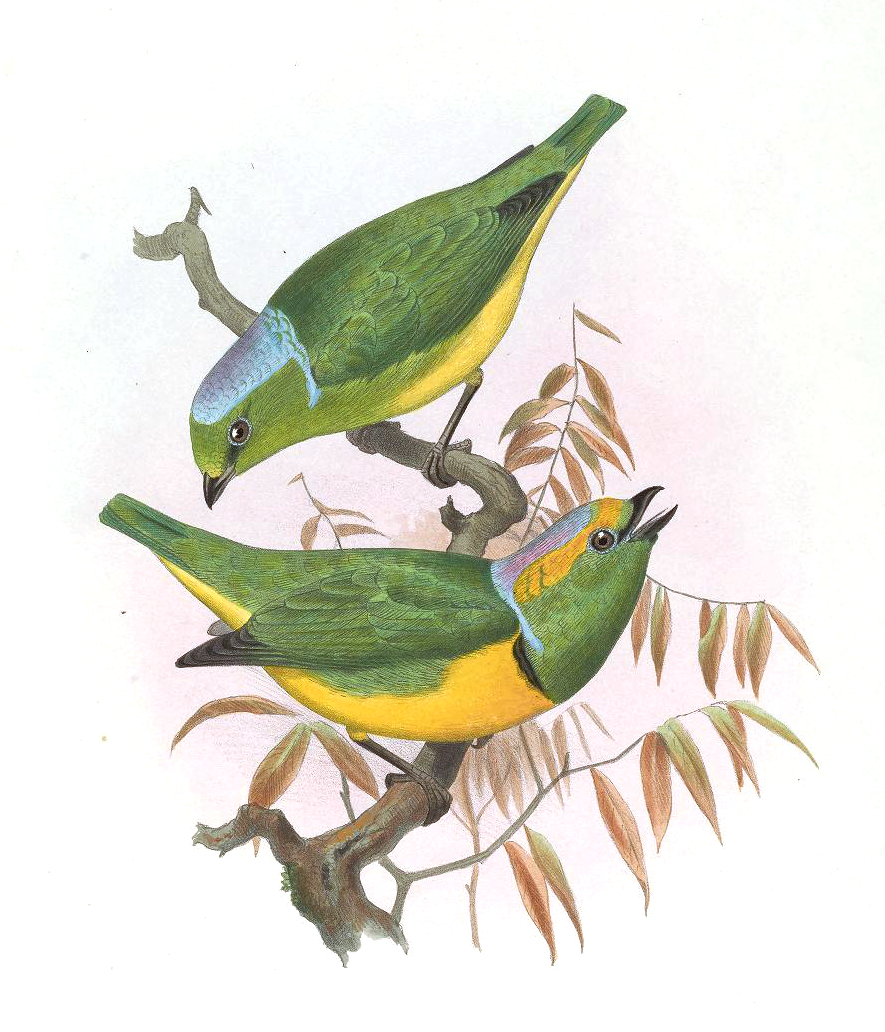
Illustration by Joseph Smit

== Description ==
The blue-crowned chlorophonia is a chunky, short-tailed, stubby-billed bird. It is about 13 cm (5.1 in) long and weighs about 24 g (0.85 oz). The species is sexually dimorphic. Adult males have pale violet-blue crown and nape, under the crown a golden-yellow forehead and wide supercilium, and a turquoise eye-ring. The rest of their face, their throat, and their upper breast are emerald-green. They have a thin turquoise collar under the nape and a thin black and chestnut line under the upper breast. Their upperparts are same shiny green as their face. The upper side of their tail is green and the underside gray. Most flight feathers are blackish with green edges; their tertials are mostly green with some dusky. Their lower breast, belly, and undertail coverts are bright yellow and their sides and flanks green. Adult females have a yellow forehead, a light blue central crown and nape, and a thin blue-violet collar. The rest of their face, their throat, their upperparts, and their uppertail coverts are shiny green. Their tail is blackish with wide green feather edges. Their flight feathers are blackish with green edges. The center of their breast and belly and their undertail coverts are yellow and the rest of their underparts are green. Both sexes have a brown iris, a dusky maxilla with a gray base, a gray mandible with a dusky tip, and dark gray legs and feet.

== Distribution and habitat ==
The golden-browed chlorophonia is found along the mountain ranges for the length of Costa Rica and into western Panama's Chiriquí and Veruagas provinces. It primarily inhabits the interior and edges of evergreen forest in the upper tropical and subtropical zones. It favors trees heavy with moss and epiphytes. Overall it ranges in elevation from 750 to 2,500 m (2,500 to 8,200 ft) but in Costa Rica is found from 1,000 m (3,300 ft) to treeline.

== Behavior ==
=== Movement ===
The golden-browed is generally considered to be a resident species. However, it is known to wander after breeding and to make some elevational movements between the breeding and non-breeding seasons when fruit is scarce at higher areas; the movements are not well defined.

=== Feeding ===
The golden-browed chlorophonia feeds almost exclusively on fruit but includes small numbers of insects in its diet. It favors the berries of mistletoe (Loranthaceae) and other small berries; it also consumes figs. It forages mostly in the forest canopy. During the breeding season it usually forages in pairs. Outside that season it may gather in small flocks of up to about 12 individuals. Though the species may share fruiting trees with other species, it only occasionally joins mixed-species feeding flocks.

=== Breeding ===
The golden-browed chlorophonia breeds between February and June in Costa Rica, and sometimes fledges two broods per season. Both sexes build the nest, a globe with a side entrance usually made mostly from moss. Sometimes grasses, other plant fibers, cow hair, and dried flowers are incorporated. It is typically placed in bromeliads or epiphytes on a tree trunk or branch between about 11 and 30 m (35 and 100 ft) above the ground. The clutch is at least three eggs that are dull white with red-brown blotches. The female alone incubates. The incubation period is not known; fledging occurs 23 to 25 days after hatch. Both parents provision nestlings by regurgitation.

=== Vocalization ===
The golden-browed chlorophonia's song is a "mournful, single-note whistle" that lasts about a second. It has been written as "koow or keeeu". It also makes contact calls that are "soft nasal notes, e.g. neck, and jip and jup". Its song is "a jumble of short but clear and melodious notes, rather disconnected, all given rather softly".

In Costa Rica its local common name is a rualdo. There is a legend of how this bird used to have a wonderful singing voice, but offered that to the volcano Poás to prevent a young woman from having to be sacrificed, thus keeping the volcano from erupting.

== Status ==
The IUCN has assessed the golden-browed chlorophonia as being of Least Concern. It has a restricted range, its estimated population of at least 50,000 mature individuals is believed to be decreasing. No immediate threats have been identified. It is considered common in Costa Rica and uncommon in Panama. It occurs in protected areas in both countries. "The species’ range does not include a large amount of intact habitat outside protected areas. While it is not considered to become at risk in the near future, populations would seem to warrant monitoring, especially in the small Panama portion of its range, where deforestation is severe."
