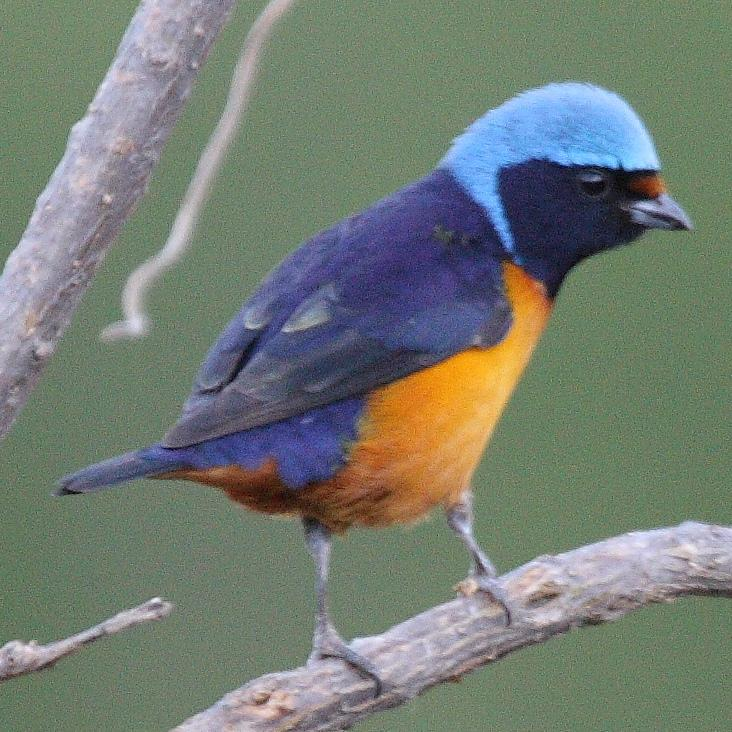

Conservation status
- Least Concern (IUCN 3.1)

Scientific classification
- Kingdom: Animalia
- Phylum: Chordata
- Class: Aves
- Order: Passeriformes
- Family: Fringillidae
- Subfamily: Euphoniinae
- Genus: Chlorophonia
- Species: C. elegantissima

Binomial name
- Chlorophonia elegantissima (Bonaparte, 1838)

Synonyms
- See text

= Elegant euphonia =

Species of bird

The elegant euphonia or blue-hooded euphonia (Chlorophonia elegantissima) is a species of bird in the family Fringillidae, the finches and euphonias. It is found in Mexico and every Central American country.

== Taxonomy and systematics ==
The elegant euphonia has a complicated taxonomic history. It was originally described in 1838 with the binomial Pipra elegantissima, mistakenly identifying it as a manakin. It was eventually reassigned to genus Euphonia that had been erected in 1806.

For a time the elegant euphonia, the golden-rumped euphonia (now C. cyanocephala), and the Hispaniolan euphonia (now C. musica) were treated as a single species called the blue-hooded euphonia. They were separated by 1998 and formed a superspecies. Following further studies, in the early 2020s those three species were reassigned by most taxonomic systems to their present genus Chlorophonia that had been erected in 1851. The first version of AviList (2025) also places the elegant euphonia in Chlorophonia. However, as of 2025 BirdLife International's Handbook of the Birds of the World retains it in Euphonia.

Genera Euphonia and Chlorophonia were long placed in the family Thraupidae, the "true" tanagers. Multiple studies in the late twentieth and early twenty-first centuries resulted in their being reassigned to their present place in the family Fringillidae.

The elegant euphonia has these three subspecies:

- C. e. rileyi (Van Rossem, 1942)
- C. e. elegantissima (Bonaparte, 1838)
- C. e. vincens (Hartert, EJO, 1913)

== Description ==
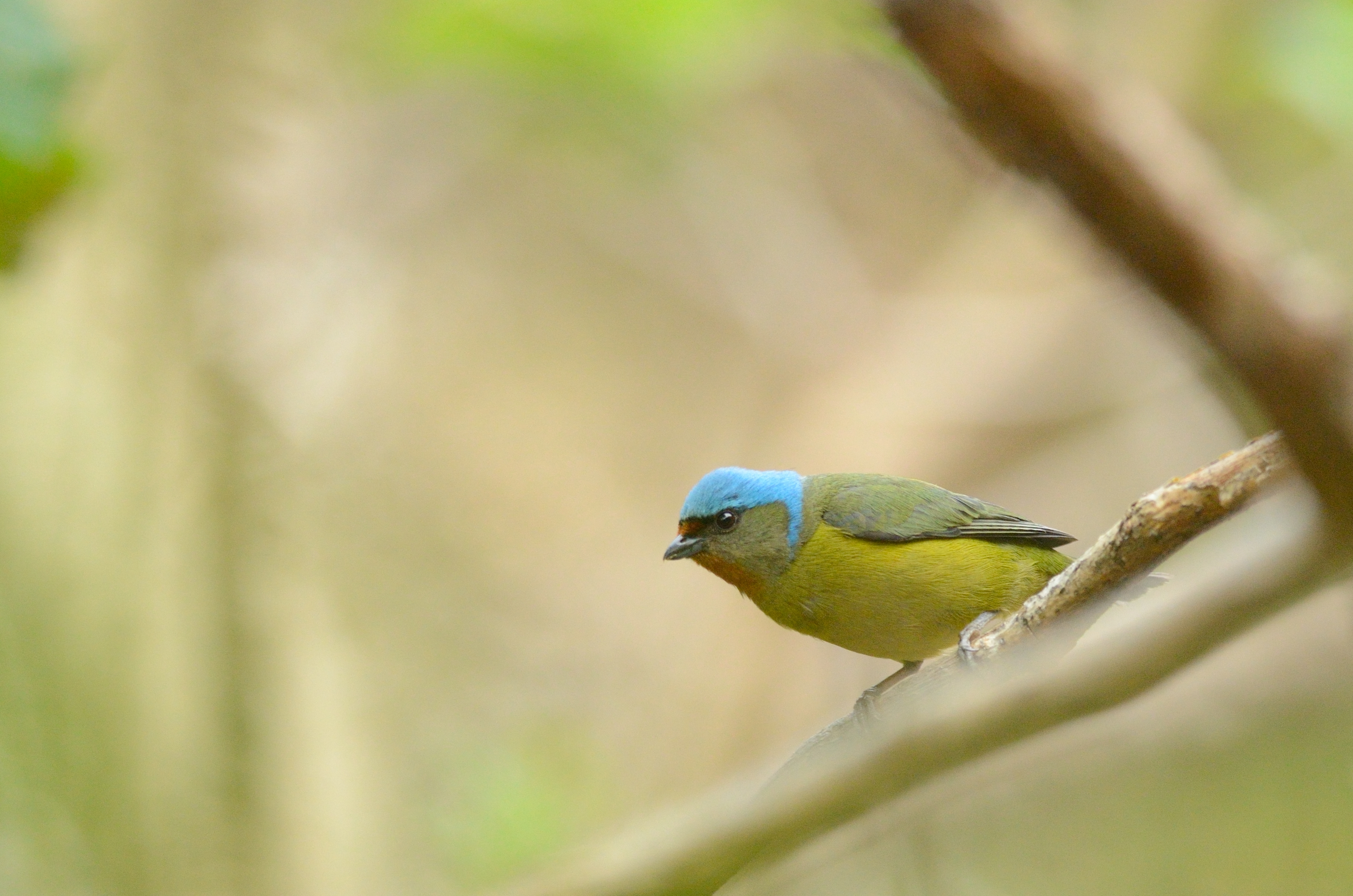
female bird

The elegant euphonia is 10 cm (3.9 in) long and weighs 13 to 17 g (0.46 to 0.60 oz). The species is sexually dimorphic. Adult males of the nominate subspecies C. e. elegantissima have a rufous forehead with a thin black border behind it. Their crown and nape are bright turquoise-blue that extends forward from the latter under the ear coverts. The rest of their head and their throat are black. Their upperparts, tail, and wings are glossy purplish black. Their underparts are tawny-orange that is darkest on the breast. Adult females have a rufous forehead. Their crown and nape are bright sky-blue that curves forward like the male's. The rest of their head is olive with a cinnamon wash on the throat. Their upperparts are bright olive-green and their tail dark olive-green. Their upperwing coverts are olive-green and their flight feathers dusky with olive-green edges. Their breast and sides are yellowish olive and their belly and undertail coverts greenish yellow. Males of subspecies C. e. rileyi have a duller crown and nape than the nominate and more steely-blue upperparts, tail, and wings. Females are overall duller than the nominate with grayer upperparts. Males of subspecies C. e. vincens have a much lighter blue crown and nape than the nominate and females have plumage intermediate between those of the other two subspecies. Both sexes of all subspecies have a dark brown iris, a blackish bill with a grayish base to the mandible, and dusky gray legs and feet.

== Distribution and habitat ==
The elegant euphonia has a highly disjunct distribution. The subspecies are found thus:

- C. e. rileyi: southeastern Sonora and northeastern Sinaloa in northwestern Mexico
- C. e. elegantissima: western and central Mexico from southern Sinaloa, Guanajuato and Nuevo León south; from Chiapas into central and southern Guatemala; northeastern Guatemala and Belize; and from northern El Salvador and much of Honduras into northwestern Nicaragua
- C. e. vincens: mountains from the Cordillera de Tilarán in central Costa Rica into Panama to Veraguas Province

The elegant euphonia inhabits a variety of landscapes including pine-oak, evergreen, and secondary forest in the upper tropical and subtropical zones. In all areas it favors trees with mistletoe (Loranthaceae). In elevation it mostly ranges from 1,000 to 2,500 m (3,300 to 8,200 ft) but regularly occurs down to 500 m (1,600 ft) in Mexico. In northern Central America it ranges from 500 to 3,050 m (1,600 to 10,000 ft) and in Costa Rica from 1,200 to 2,200 m (3,900 to 7,200 ft).

== Behavior ==
=== Movement ===
The elegant euphonia is generally considered a resident species. However, some of the members of the furthest north populations are thought to migrate south in winter, and some are known to move to lower elevations in the non-breeding season. Post-breeding movements to lower elevations are known in Costa Rica and suspected in Panama.

=== Feeding ===
The elegant euphonia feeds almost exclusively on small berries, especially those of mistletoe. It forages in pairs or flocks of up to about 10 individuals that often roam in search of trees with ripe mistletoe.

=== Breeding ===
The elegant euphonia's breeding season has not been fully defined. Its nest is a side-entrance globe woven from dry grass and rootlets and lined with finer grass. It is placed in a niche in an earthen bank or in an epiphyte or clump of moss on a tree trunk or branch fork. Nests have been noted as high as 18 m (60 ft) above the ground. The clutch size, incubation period, time to fledging, and details of parental care are not known.

=== Vocalization ===
The elegant euphonia's song has been described as a "rapidly delivered liquid warble lasting up to several minutes with various complaining chatters, buzzes, and clear whistles". Its calls include "a sharp sip or suiit and a nasal ernt".

== Status ==
The IUCN has assessed the elegant euphonia as being of Least Concern. It has a very large range; its estimated population of at least 50,000 mature individuals is believed to be decreasing. No immediate threats have been identified. It is considered "fairly common over most of [its] range" though "uncommon and seasonal" in northern Central America and "fairly uncommon" in Costa Rica.
