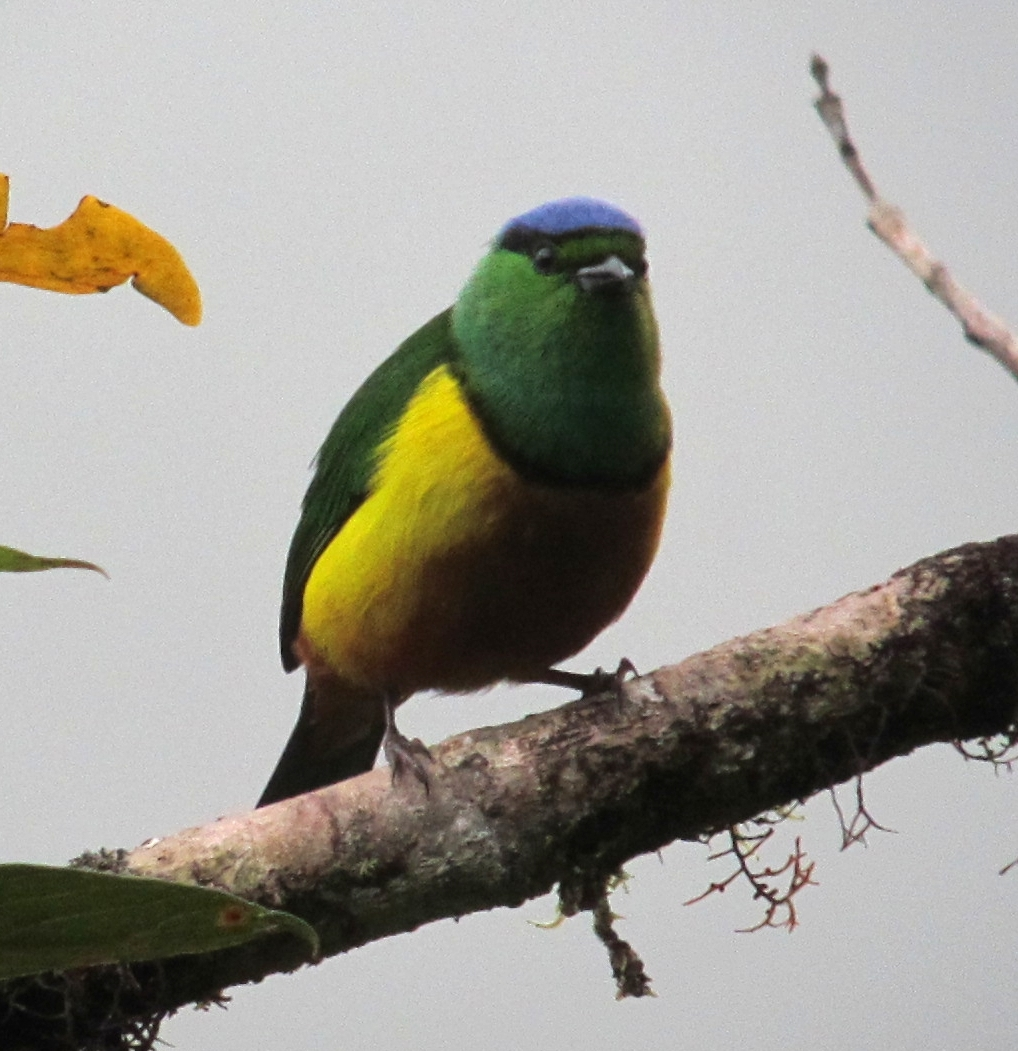

Conservation status
- Least Concern (IUCN 3.1)

Scientific classification
- Kingdom: Animalia
- Phylum: Chordata
- Class: Aves
- Order: Passeriformes
- Family: Fringillidae
- Subfamily: Euphoniinae
- Genus: Chlorophonia
- Species: C. pyrrhophrys

Binomial name
- Chlorophonia pyrrhophrys (Sclater, PL, 1851)

= Chestnut-breasted chlorophonia =

Species of bird

The chestnut-breasted chlorophonia (Chlorophonia pyrrhophrys) is a species of bird in the family Fringillidae, the finches and euphonias. It is found in Colombia, Ecuador, Peru, and Venezuela.

== Taxonomy and systematics ==
The chesntnut-breasted chlorophonia was originally described in 1851 with the binomial Euphonia pyrrhophrys. It was eventually reassigned to genus Chlorophonia that had been erected in that same year.

The genus Chlorophonia was long placed in the family Thraupidae, the "true" tanagers. Multiple studies in the late twentieth and early twenty-first centuries resulted in its being reassigned to its present place in the family Fringillidae.

The chestnut-breasted chlorophonia is monotypic.

== Description ==
The chestnut-breasted chlorophonia is a chunky, short-tailed, stubby-billed bird. It is about 12 cm (4.7 in) long and weighs 16 to 18 g (0.56 to 0.63 oz). The species is sexually dimorphic. Adult males have a green forehead and a rich cyanine-blue crown and nape. They have a thin dark red band between them that extends past the eye and a thin pale blue band at the base of the nape. Their lores, face, throat, and upper breast are shiny emerald-green with a thin black line beneath the upper breast. Their mantle, back, and upperwing coverts are bright green and their rump bright yellow. Their tail's central feathers are dusky with thin green edges and the rest dusky with wide green edges. Their primary coverts and most flight feathers are blackish with bright green edges; their tertials are green. The center of their lower breast, belly, and vent are deep chestnut with bright yellow on either side. Adult females are duller and plainer than males. They have a turquoise-blue crown and nape. The rest of their face and upper breast are generally patterned like the male's but a paler green and lack the black line below the upper breast and the pale blue band below the nape. Their back and rump are a slightly darker green than their upper breast and their upperwing coverts dusky with wide green edges. Their tail is like the male's. Most of their flight feathers are blackish with dark green edges and their tertials are green. Their lower breast and the rest of their underparts are dull yellowish. Both sexes have a dark brown iris, a blackish bill with a pale gray base to the mandible, and dark gray legs and feet. Immatures are mostly green with a yellowish belly.

== Distribution and habitat ==
The chestnut-breasted chlorophonia has a highly disjunct distribution along the Andes. One population is in the Serranía del Perijá on the Venezuela-Colombia border. Another stretches from Trujillo state in western Venezuela southwest slightly into Colombia. Others are found intermittently in Colombia's Central and Western Andes and on the western Andean slope into northern Ecuador as far as Pichincha Province. A population also extends from the southern end of Colombia's Central Andes south on the eastern slope through Ecuador into northern Peru's eastern Cajamarca and western Piura departments. Another in Peru extends intermittently from Amazonas Department south to Junín Department.

The chestnut-breasted chlorophonia inhabits the interior and edges of humid to wet montane forest including cloudforest heavy with epiphytes. It also occurs in mature secondary forest and occasionally in elfin forest. In elevation it occurs between 1,800 and 3,000 m (5,900 and 9,800 ft) in Venezuela, between 1,500 and 3,000 m (4,900 and 9,800 ft) in Colombia, mostly between 1,500 and 2,750 m (4,900 and 9,000 ft) in Ecuador, and between 1,700 and 2,450 m (5,600 and 8,000 ft) in Peru.

== Behavior ==
=== Movement ===
The chestnut-breasted chlorophonia is primarily a resident species but some local movements in response to food availability have been noted.

=== Feeding ===
The chestnut-breasted chlorophonia feed mostly on mistletoe (Loranthaceae) berries and lesser amounts of other berries and fruits. It occasionally includes insects in its diet. It usually forages in pairs and sometimes in family or other slightly larger groups. It seldom joins mixed-species feeding flocks and also seldom shares fruiting trees with other species. It forages mostly in the forest canopy, especially in clumps of epiphytes.

=== Breeding ===
The chestnut-breasted chlorophonia's breeding seasons have not been defined but its season in Venezuela includes March. Both sexes build the nest, a dome with a side entrance made from plant fibers. One nest was in a niche in an earthen bank along a road. Parents regurgitate food for nestlings. The clutch size, incubation period, time to fledging, and other details of parental care are not known.

=== Vocalization ===
One description of the chestnut-breasted chlorophonia's song is "a long, rambling tut-tut-tut too-dée...or na-deaár, na-deaár...to-d'leép with variations". Its most common call is "a soft, nasal neck-nuur over and over". It also makes "a nasal, downslurred whistle, teeeur" as a contact call. Its song is also described as "a mechanical series of squeaks, liquid notes, and whistles, often with a characteristic nasal note inserted" and its call as "a unique series of nasal notes" bee bee... or CHEE-bee-bee-bee".

== Status ==
The IUCN has assessed the chestnut-breasted chlorophonia as being of Least Concern. It has a large range; its population size is not known and is believed to be decreasing. No immediate threats have been identified. It is considered "uncommon and somewhat local" in Venezuela, "uncommon and rather erratic" in Colombia, and "rare to locally uncommon" in Peru. It occurs in many protected areas but "[d]eforestation and the fragmentation of existing montane forest continue to be the two most pressing problems facing this species".
