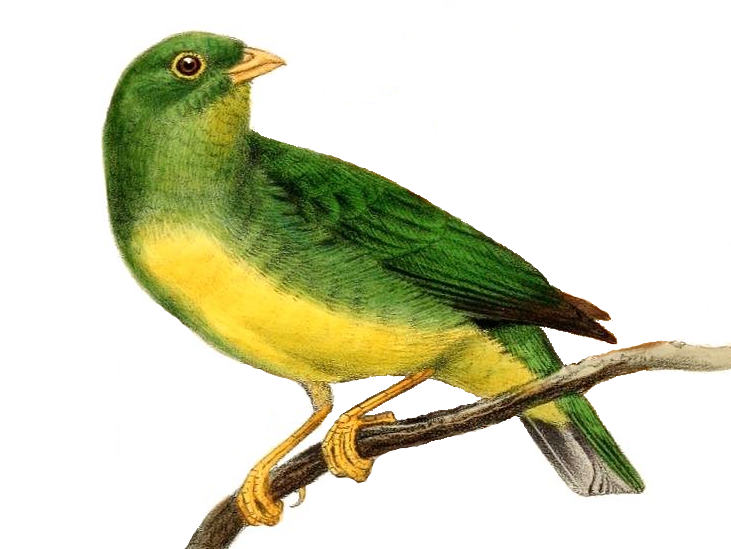
- Illustration by Joseph Smit, 1886
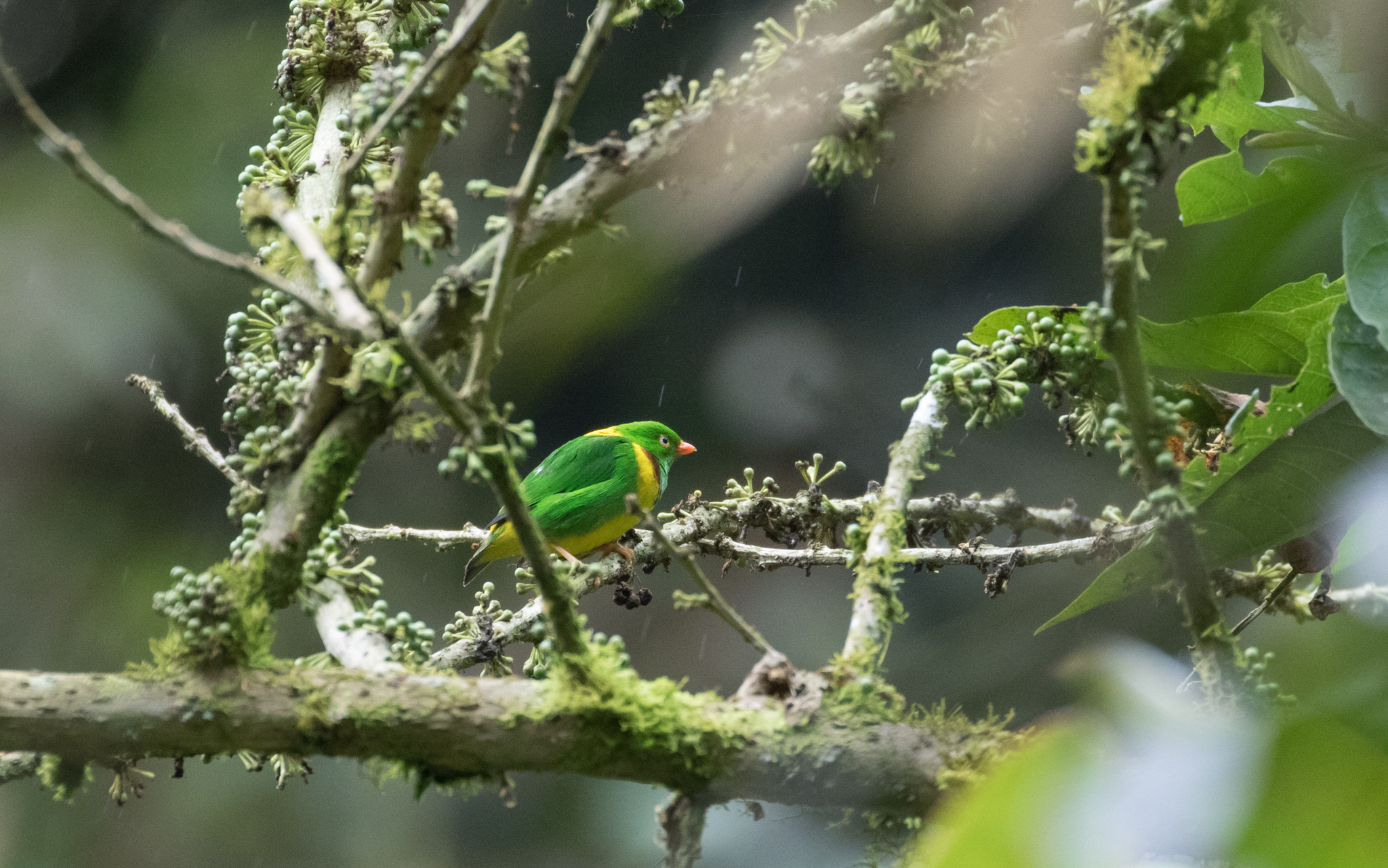

Conservation status
- Least Concern (IUCN 3.1)

Scientific classification
- Kingdom: Animalia
- Phylum: Chordata
- Class: Aves
- Order: Passeriformes
- Family: Fringillidae
- Subfamily: Euphoniinae
- Genus: Chlorophonia
- Species: C. flavirostris

Binomial name
- Chlorophonia flavirostris P.L. Sclater, 1861

= Yellow-collared chlorophonia =

Species of bird

The yellow-collared chlorophonia (Chlorophonia flavirostris) is a species of bird in the family Fringillidae, the finches and euphonias. It is found in Colombia, Ecuador, and Panama.

== Taxonomy and systematics ==
The yellow-collared chlorophonia was originally described in 1861 with its current binomial Chlorophonia flavirostris. The genus Chlorophonia was long placed in the family Thraupidae, the "true" tanagers. Multiple studies in the late twentieth and early twenty-first centuries resulted in its being reassigned to its present place in the family Fringillidae.

The yellow-collared chlorophonia is monotypic.

== Description ==
The yellow-collared chlorophonia is a chunky, short-tailed, stubby-billed bird. It is about 10 cm (3.9 in) long and weighs about 11 to 12 g (0.39 to 0.42 oz). The species is sexually dimorphic. Adult males have a shiny emerald-green head with a conspicuous yellow eye-ring. Their throat and upper breast are the same green. Together they are bordered by a wide yellow collar with a thin chestnut line between the two colors on the side of the breast. Their mantle, back, upperwing coverts, and tail are shiny emerald-green and their rump and uppertail coverts bright yellow. Most flight feathers are dusky with green edges; their tertials are green. The center of their breast is bright yellow and the rest of their underparts are bright green. Adult females are duller and plainer than males. They are mostly grass-green including their tail. Most of their flight feathers are dusky with green edges and their tertials are grass-green. The center of their breast is faded yellow and the rest of their underparts are bright yellow. Both sexes have a grayish white iris, an orange to salmon-orange bill, and bright orange legs and feet; females' eye-ring, iris, and bill are not as bright as males'.

== Distribution and habitat ==
The yellow-collared chlorophonia has a disjunct distribution. Its main population is found on the west slope of the Andes of Colombia's Western Andes from east-central Chocó and southern Antioquia departments south into northern Ecuador as far as northern Cotopaxi Province. It was first documented in Panama in 1986. A small population is apparently established on and in the vicinity of Cerro Pirre in extreme eastern Panama's Darién Province. The species primarily inhabits the interior and edges of humid to very wet foothill and lower montane evergreen forest in the upper tropical and subtropical zones. It also occurs in mature secondary forest and appears to favor steep slopes. In Colombia it ranges in elevation between 200 and 1,800 m (700 and 5,900 ft) and in Ecuador mostly between 400 and 1,500 m (1,300 and 4,900 ft).

== Behavior ==
=== Movement ===
The yellow-collared chlorophonia is primarily a resident species. However, it wanders a great deal, usually over short distances, and makes what appears to be seasonal elevational movements.

=== Feeding ===
The yellow-collared chlorophonia feeds almost exclusively on small berries and other fruits but includes a few insects in its diet. It mostly forages in pairs or in groups of up to about seven birds that sometimes join mixed-species feeding flocks. Outside the breeding season it can gather in flocks of up to about 50 individuals that travel separately from mixed-species flocks. It forages mostly in the forest canopy.

=== Breeding ===
The yellow-collard chlorophonia's breeding season has not been fully established but includes April and May. One nest was a ball made from moss with a side entrance placed about 14 m (45 ft) above the ground. Another was about 8 m (25 ft) up. The clutch size, incubation period, time to fledging, and details of parental care are not known.

=== Vocalization ===
The yellow-collared euphonia in flight often makes a "nasal and plaintive call...a drawn-out peeeeeeee, sometimes interspersed with short, clear, winh calls". It also makes "soft pek notes" while foraging.

== Status ==
The IUCN has assessed the yellow-collared chlorophonia as being of Least Concern. It has a small range; its population size is not known and is believed to be decreasing. No immediate threats have been identified. It is considered "locally fairly common" in Colombia and "scarce and perhaps seasonal or erratic" in Ecuador. It occurs in at least two protected areas in Colombia.
