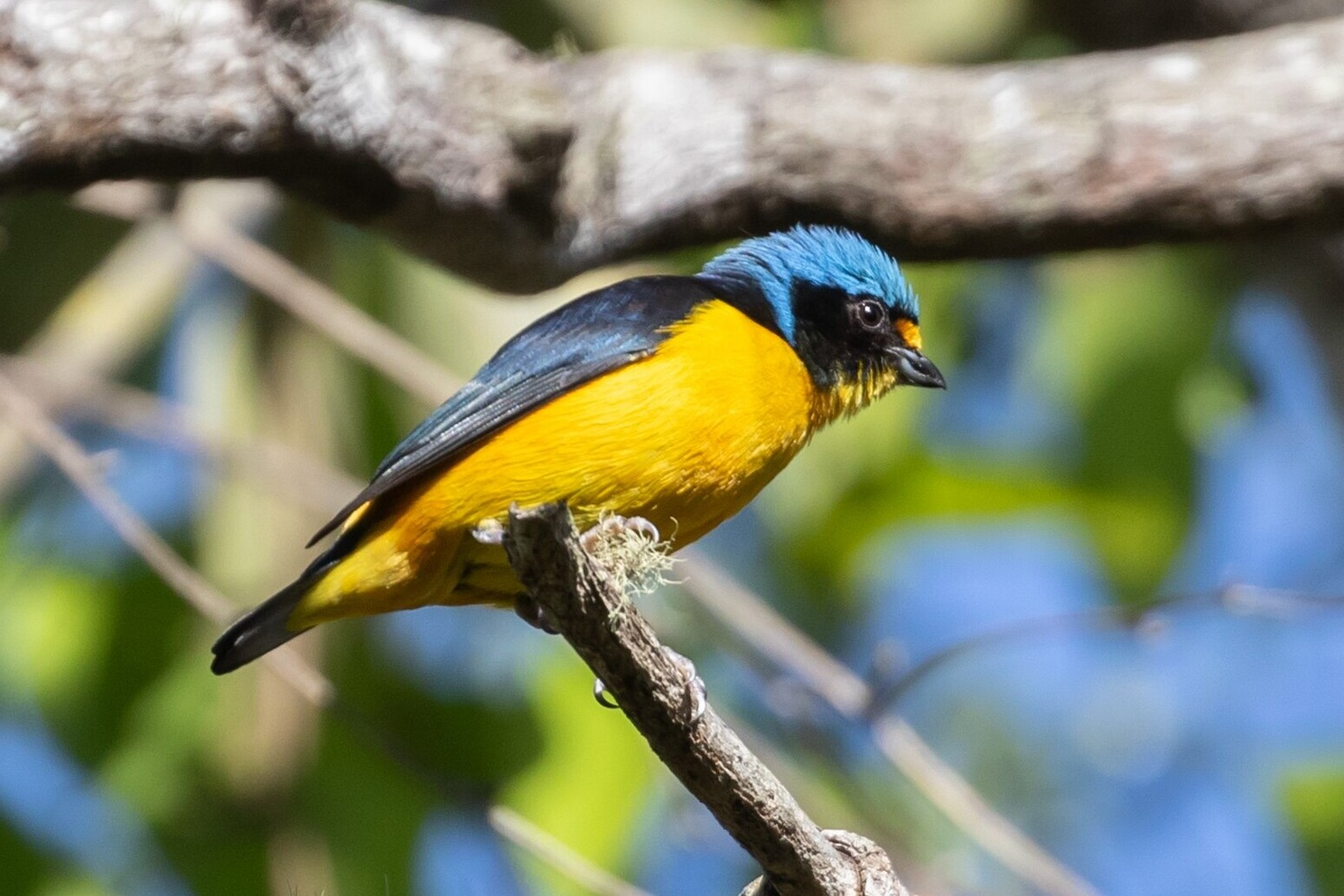
- Male
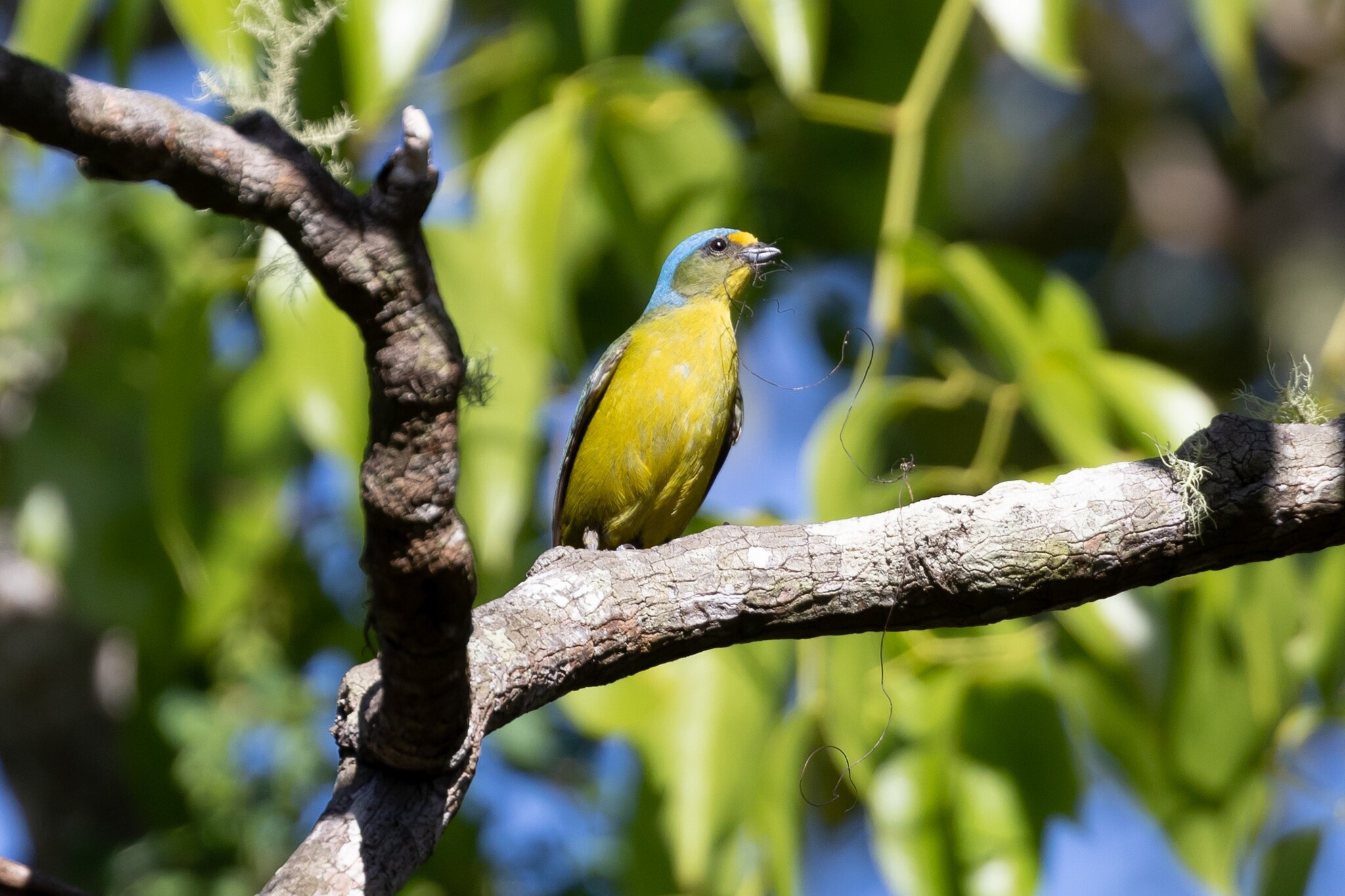
- Female

Conservation status
- Least Concern (IUCN 3.1)

Scientific classification
- Kingdom: Animalia
- Phylum: Chordata
- Class: Aves
- Order: Passeriformes
- Family: Fringillidae
- Subfamily: Euphoniinae
- Genus: Chlorophonia
- Species: C. sclateri

Binomial name
- Chlorophonia sclateri (Sclater, PL, 1854)

Synonyms
- See text

= Puerto Rican euphonia =

Species of bird

The Puerto Rican euphonia (Chlorophonia sclateri) is a species of bird in the family Fringillidae, the finches and euphonias. It is endemic to the island of Puerto Rico in the Caribbean.

== Taxonomy and systematics ==
The Puerto Rican euphonia has a complicated taxonomic history. It was originally listed with the binomial Cyanophonia sclateri. For the rest of the nineteenth century and into the twentieth it was treated as a full species. In much of the twentieth century it and several other euphonias were treated as subspecies of what was then the "blue-hooded euphonia" (Euphonia elegantissima sensu lato). By 1998 the blue-hooded euphonia was split into three species with what is now the Puerto Rican euphonia treated as a subspecies of the "Antillean euphonia" (Euphonia musica sensu lato). Following further studies, in the early 2020s those three species were reassigned by most taxonomic systems to their present genus Chlorophonia that had been erected in 1851. However, BirdLife International's Handbook of the Birds of the World retained them in Euphonia.

Genera Euphonia and Chlorophonia were long placed in the family Thraupidae, the "true" tanagers. Multiple studies in the late twentieth and early twenty-first centuries resulted in their being reassigned to their present place in the family Fringillidae.

Beginning in 2016 the Antillean euphonia was split into the Hispaniolan euphonia (C. musica sensu stricto), the Puerto Rican euphonia (C. sclateri), and the Lesser Antillean euphonia (C. flavifrons) and the splits were widely adopted by 2023.

The Puerto Rican euphonia is monotypic.

== Description ==
The Puerto Rican euphonia is about 10 to 12 cm (3.9 to 4.7 in) long and weighs about 12 to 16 g (0.42 to 0.56 oz). The species is sexually dimorphic. Adult males have an orange-yellow forehead that is separated from the forecrown by a narrow dark blue strip. Their crown and nape are sky blue that extends forward from the latter under the ear coverts. The rest of their head is dark violet blue. Their back is black with a blue gloss; it appears blue in direct light. Their rump and uppertail coverts are bright yellow. Their tail and wing coverts are black with bluish reflections. Their flight feathers are black with thin blue edges. Their throat is yellow and the rest of their underparts dull orange yellow with a slight brownish tinge on the crissum. Adult females' foreheads can be red, yellow, or yellowish olive green. Their crown and nape are blue that curves forward like the male's. The rest of their head is mostly olive green with a yellowish chin and throat. Their back, wings, and tail are olive green. Their underparts are dull olive yellow. Both sexes have a dark brown iris, a black maxilla, a blackish mandible with a grayish base, and dark gray to black legs and feet.

== Distribution and habitat ==
The Puerto Rican euphonia is found throughout the island of Puerto Rico. It inhabits a variety of landscapes including the interior and edges of evergreen, deciduous, and secondary forests. It especially favors areas heavy with mistletoe (Loranthaceae). In elevation it ranges from sea level to the island's highest point at about 1,300 m (4,300 ft).

== Behavior ==
=== Movement ===
The Puerto Rican euphonia is generally considered to be a resident species. However, some movement to lower elevations after breeding have been suggested.

=== Feeding ===
The Puerto Rican euphonia feeds on small fruits, almost entirely those of mistletoe. It includes smaller amounts of other fruits and also small arthropods in its diet. It feeds mostly in the forest canopy. It forages mostly in pairs and occasionally joins mixed-species feeding flocks.

=== Breeding ===
The Puerto Rican euphonia apparently breeds throughout the year with the greatest activity between March and June. Its nest is a side-entrance sphere made from lichens, moss, bark strips, and spider web and lined with finer plant material. It is typically well hidden in moss or an epiphyte. Nests have been found between about 3 and 20 m (10 and 65 ft) above the ground. The usual clutch is two to four eggs that are a slightly glossy white with mauve or reddish brown markings. The incubation period, time to fledging, and details of parental care are not known.

=== Vocalization ===
Both male and female Puerto Rican euphonias sing, with females typically having the more complex song. The song is a rambling, jumbled series of rapid squeaks, whistles, and tink notes. Another description of the song is "a trilling, tinkling tuc-tuc-tuc..., punctuated with sharp whistles, often in long rambling discourse for up to 20 minutes with little or no pause". While foraging it makes "a plaintive whistle".

== Status ==
The IUCN has assessed the Puerto Rican euphonia as being of Least Concern. It has a restricted range; its population size is not known but is believed to be stable. No immediate threats have been identified and it does not appear to be trapped for the pet trade. It is considered locally common overall. It is common in El Yunque National Forest and also occurs in other protected areas.
