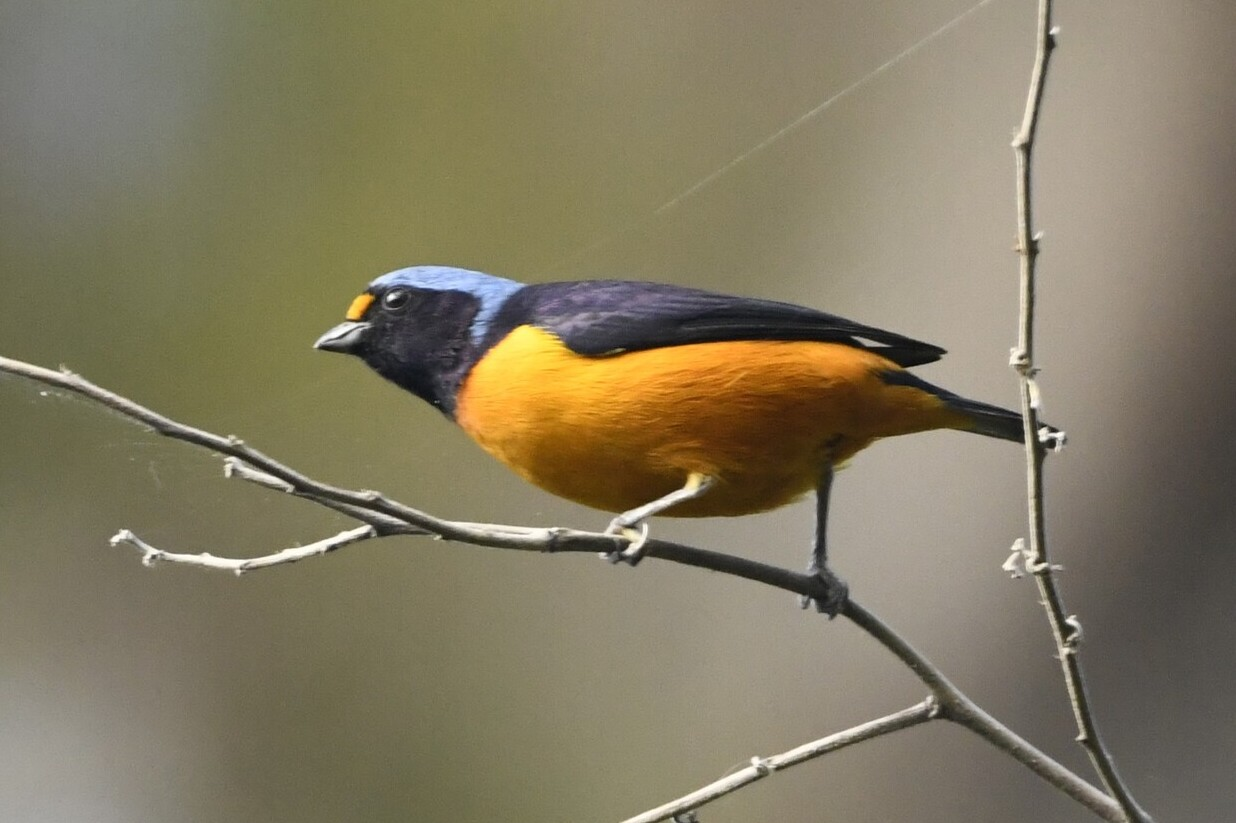
- Male in the Dominican Republic
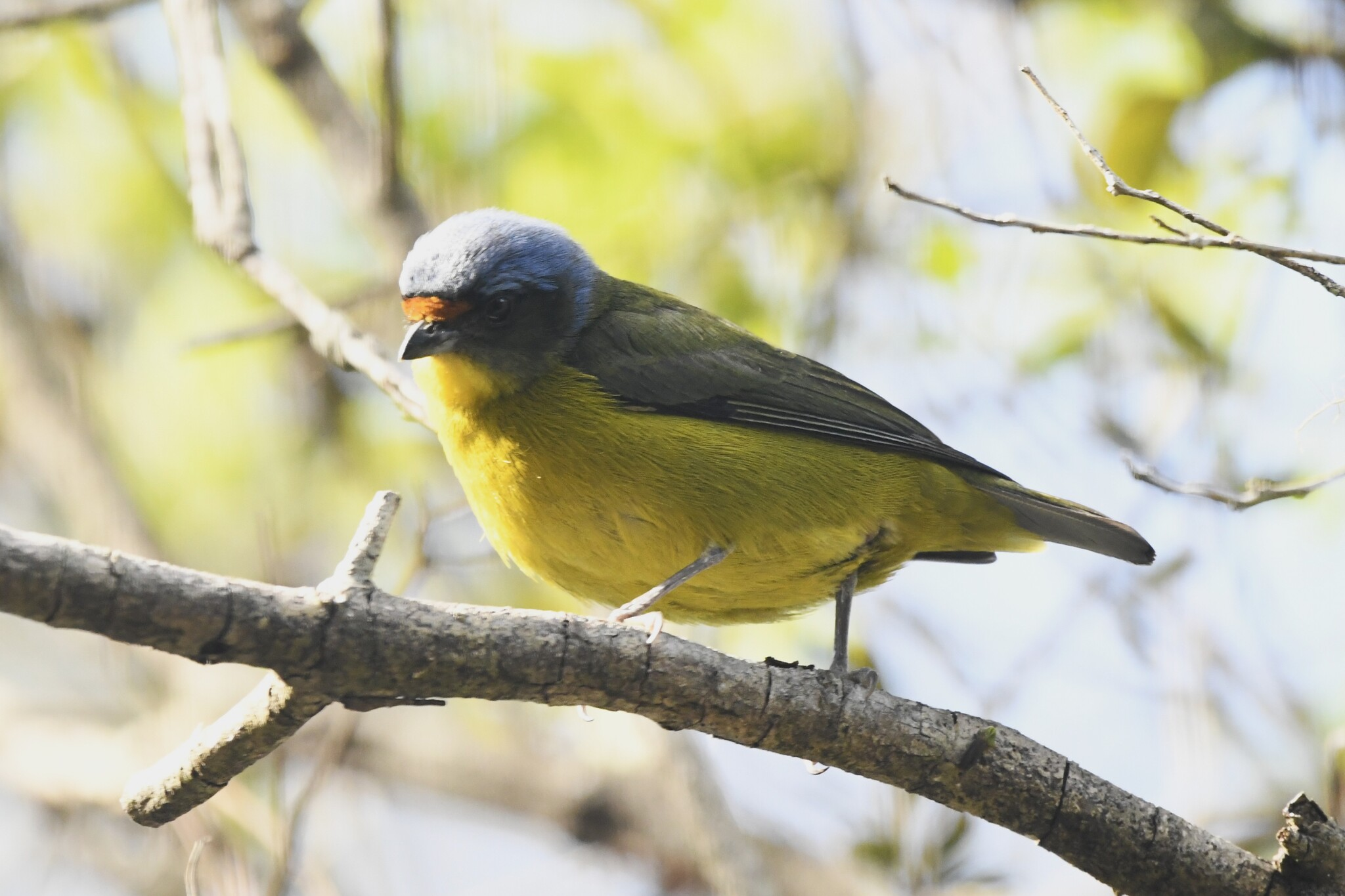
- Female in the Dominican Republic

Conservation status
- Least Concern (IUCN 3.1)

Scientific classification
- Kingdom: Animalia
- Phylum: Chordata
- Class: Aves
- Order: Passeriformes
- Family: Fringillidae
- Subfamily: Euphoniinae
- Genus: Chlorophonia
- Species: C. musica

Binomial name
- Chlorophonia musica (Gmelin, JF, 1789)

Synonyms
- See text

= Hispaniolan euphonia =

Species of bird

The Hispaniolan euphonia (Chlorophonia musica) is a species of bird in the family Fringillidae, the finches and euphonias. It is endemic to the Caribbean island of Hispaniola that is shared by the Dominican Republic and Haiti.

== Taxonomy and systematics ==
The Hispaniolan euphonia has a complicated taxonomic history. It was formally described in 1789 by the German naturalist Johann Friedrich Gmelin in his revised and expanded edition of Carl Linnaeus's Systema Naturae. He placed it with the manakins in the genus Pipra and coined the binomial Pipra musica. The specific epithet is from Latin musicus meaning "musical" or "musician". Gmelin based his account on "L'organiste", a bird from Saint-Domingue, a French colony on the island of Hispaniola, that had been described in 1778 by the French polymath the Comte de Buffon in his multi-volume work, Histoire Naturelle des Oiseaux. A hand-colored engraving by François-Nicolas Martinet was published separately to accompany Buffon's text. The species was eventually reassigned to genus Euphonia that had been erected in 1806.

For a time the Hispaniolan euphonia, the golden-rumped euphonia (now C. cyanocephala), and the elegant euphonia (now C. elegantissima) were treated as a single species called the blue-hooded euphonia. They were separated by 1998 and formed a superspecies. Following further studies, in the early 2020s those three species were reassigned by most taxonomic systems to their present genus Chlorophonia that had been erected in 1851. The first version of AviList (2025) also places the Hispaniolan euphonia in Chlorophonia. However, as of 2025 BirdLife International's Handbook of the Birds of the World retains it in Euphonia.

Genera Euphonia and Chlorophonia were long placed in the family Thraupidae, the "true" tanagers. Multiple studies in the late twentieth and early twenty-first centuries resulted in their being reassigned to their present place in the family Fringillidae.

At the time Euphonia musica became Chlorophonia musica and for a few years thereafter it bore the English name "Antillean euphonia" and contained three subspecies. Beginning in 2016 the three were split into the Hispaniolan euphonia (C. musica sensu stricto), the Puerto Rican euphonia (C. sclateri), and the Lesser Antillean euphonia (C. flavifrons) and the splits were widely adopted by 2023.

The Hispaniolan euphonia is monotypic.

== Description ==
The Hispaniolan euphonia is about 10 to 12 cm (3.9 to 4.7 in) long. The species is sexually dimorphic. Adult males have a tawny yellow forehead that is separated from the forecrown by a narrow blackish strip. Their crown and nape are sky blue that extends forward from the latter under the ear coverts. The rest of their head and their throat are blackish violet. Their back and wing coverts are black with a dark blue gloss and their rump and uppertail coverts are rich tawny yellow. Their tail is dull black. Their flight feathers are dull black with thin medium blue edges. Their underparts are rich tawny yellow. Adult females have a deep yellow forehead with a dusky strip behind it. Their crown and nape are turquoise that curves forward like the male's. The rest of their head is mostly olive green with a yellow chin and throat. Their back, scapulars, wing coverts, and uppertail coverts are olive green with a slight metallic bluish green gloss. Their rump is yellowish olive green. Their tail is blackish with wide olive green feather edges. Their flight feathers are mostly blackish with thin olive green edges on the primaries and wide ones on the secondaries. Their breast is deep olive yellow and their belly, vent, and undertail coverts pure yellow. Both sexes have a dark brown iris, a black maxilla, a blue-gray mandible with a black tip, and dark gray to black legs and feet.

== Distribution and habitat ==
The Hispaniolan euphonia has a disjunct distribution across the island of Hispaniola in both the Dominican Republic and Haiti, and is also found on the small satellite Gonâve Island. It inhabits a variety of landscapes including the interior and edges of evergreen, deciduous, and pine forests and also nearby disturbed areas and shade coffee plantations. In all areas it favors trees with mistletoe (Loranthaceae). It ranges from sea level to the island's highest elevations.

== Behavior ==
=== Movement ===
The Hispaniolan euphonia is a resident species.

=== Feeding ===
The Hispaniolan euphonia feeds almost exclusively on small berries, especially those of mistletoe. It forages in pairs and occasionally joins mixed-species feeding flocks.

=== Breeding ===
The Hispaniolan euphonia's breeding season has not been fully defined, but the species may breed at any time of year. Its nest has not been described and the clutch size, incubation period, time to fledging, and details of parental care are not known.

=== Vocalization ===
The Hispaniolan euphonia's song is "a trilling, tinkling tuc-tuc-tuc..., punctuated with sharp whistles, often in [a] long rambling discourse for up to 20 minutes with little or no pause". Its calls include "a plaintive whistle" often followed by "a soft tuk-tuk, ee-oo-tuk-tuk, or i-i-i-u-u-…..tuk, tuk".

== Status ==
The IUCN has assessed the Hispaniolan euphonia as being of Least Concern. Its population size is not known and is believed to be decreasing. "Loss of forest habitat, primarily for conversion to agriculture, for timber and for fuel is thought to be the primary threat to the species, however it is able to use a variety of vegetated habitats and the impact on the population is likely to be minor." It is also illegally trapped for the pet trade but apparently at only a low level. It is considered common to locally common. It occurs in national parks in both the Dominican Republic and Haiti.
