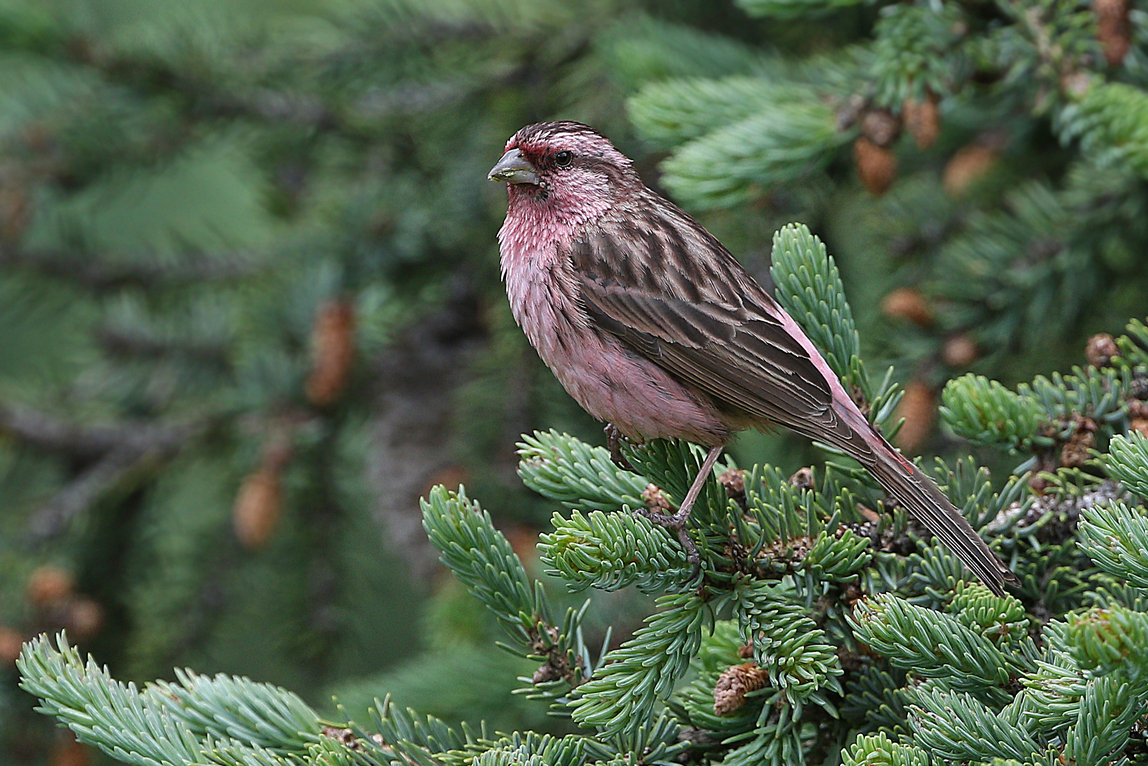
- Male in China
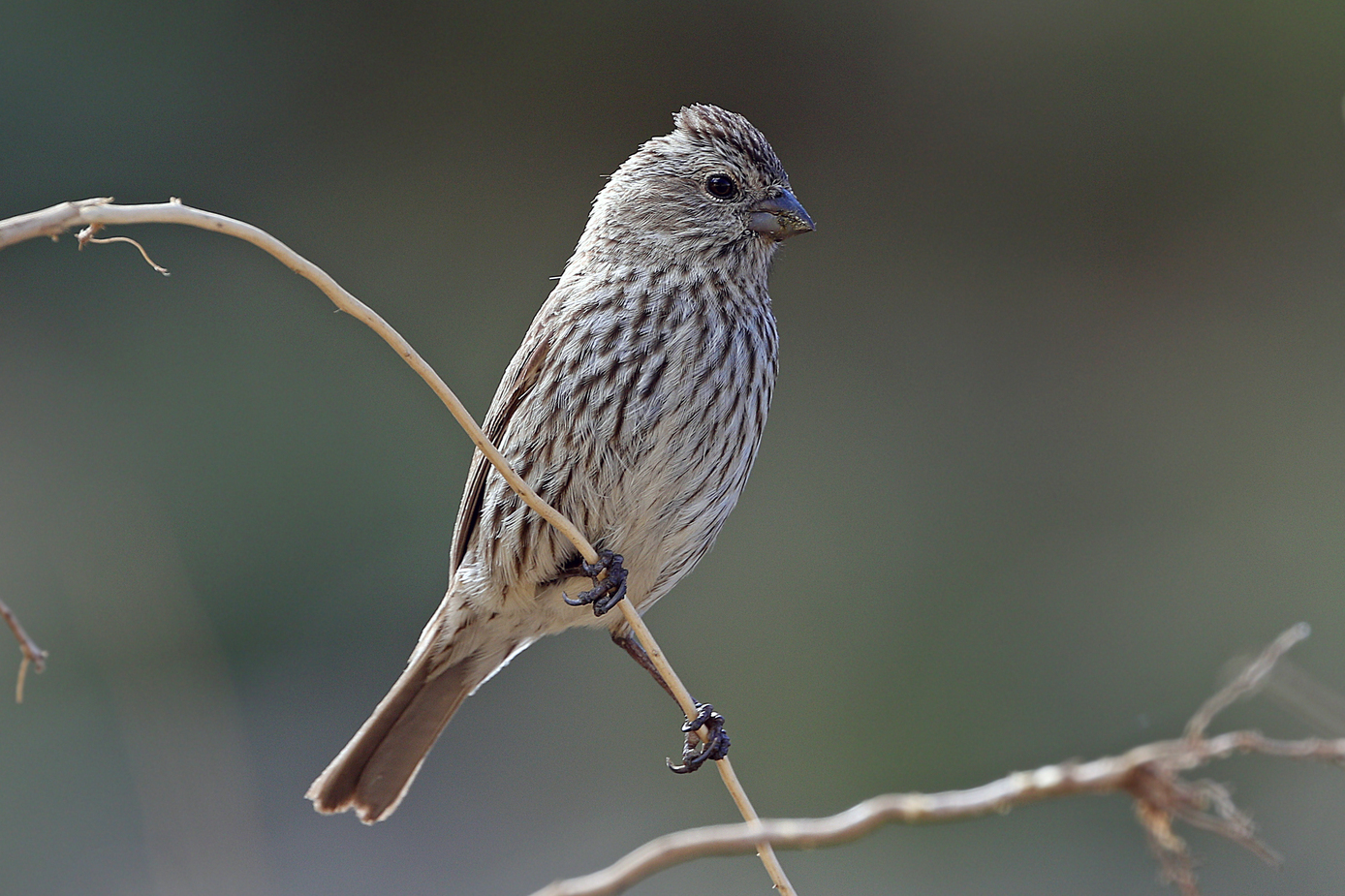
- Female in China

Conservation status
- Least Concern (IUCN 3.1)

Scientific classification
- Kingdom: Animalia
- Phylum: Chordata
- Class: Aves
- Order: Passeriformes
- Family: Fringillidae
- Subfamily: Carduelinae
- Genus: Carpodacus
- Species: C. waltoni

Binomial name
- Carpodacus waltoni (Sharpe, 1905)

= Pink-rumped rosefinch =

Species of bird

The pink-rumped rosefinch (Carpodacus waltoni) is a species of finch in the family Fringillidae.

It is found in central China and eastern Tibet. Its natural habitat is temperate grassland. Its most peculiar characteristic is the pink colour of its wings.
