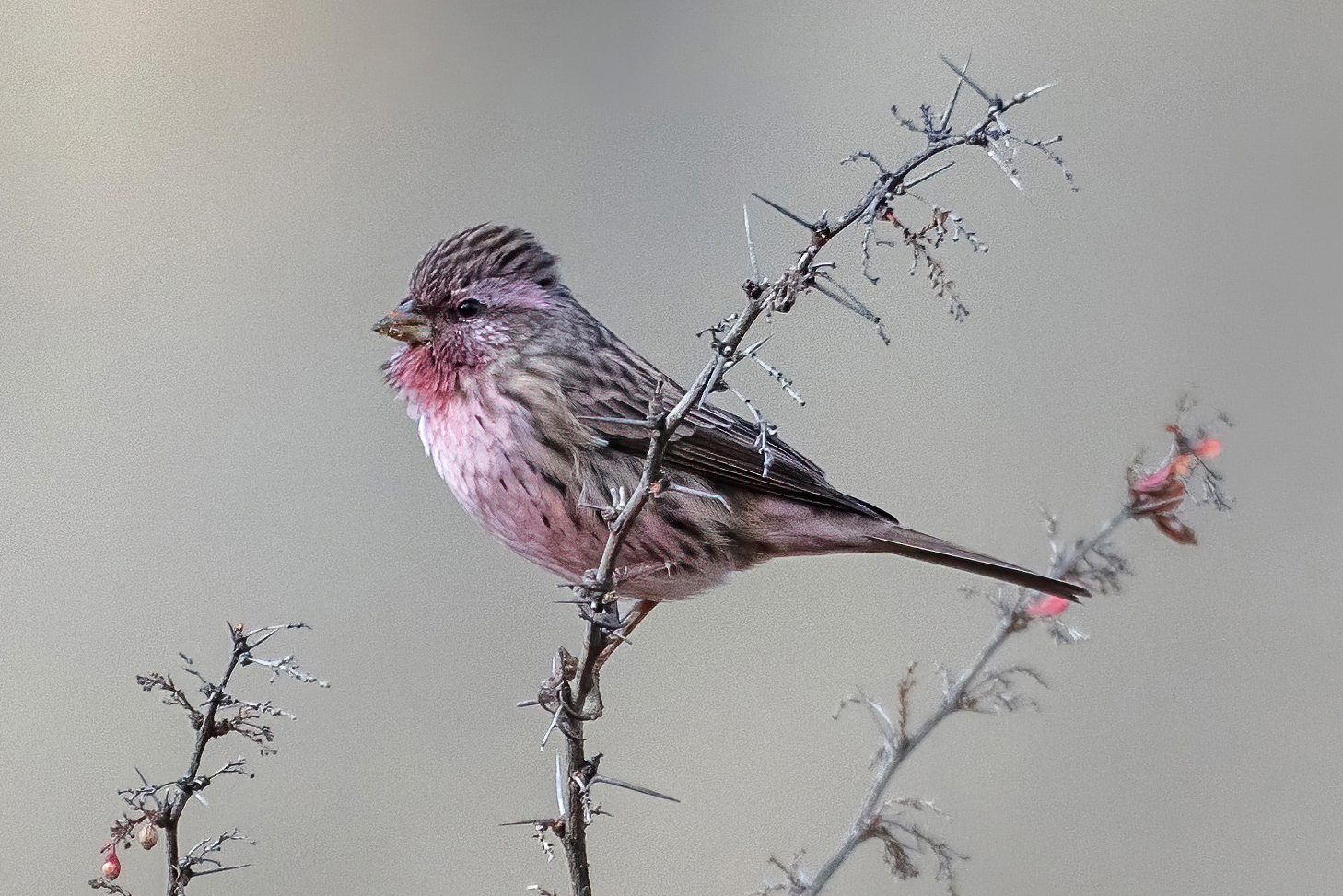

Conservation status
- Least Concern (IUCN 3.1)

Scientific classification
- Kingdom: Animalia
- Phylum: Chordata
- Class: Aves
- Order: Passeriformes
- Family: Fringillidae
- Subfamily: Carduelinae
- Genus: Carpodacus
- Species: C. pulcherrimus

Binomial name
- Carpodacus pulcherrimus (Moore, F, 1856)

= Himalayan beautiful rosefinch =

Species of bird

The Himalayan beautiful rosefinch (Carpodacus pulcherrimus) is a true finch species (family Fringillidae). It is found in mid-western China and the northern Himalayas. Its natural habitats are temperate shrubland and subtropical or tropical high-altitude shrubland.
