= White-browed rosefinch =

The white-browed rosefinch has been split into two species:

- Himalayan white-browed rosefinch (Carpodacus thura)
- Chinese white-browed rosefinch (Carpodacus dubius)
