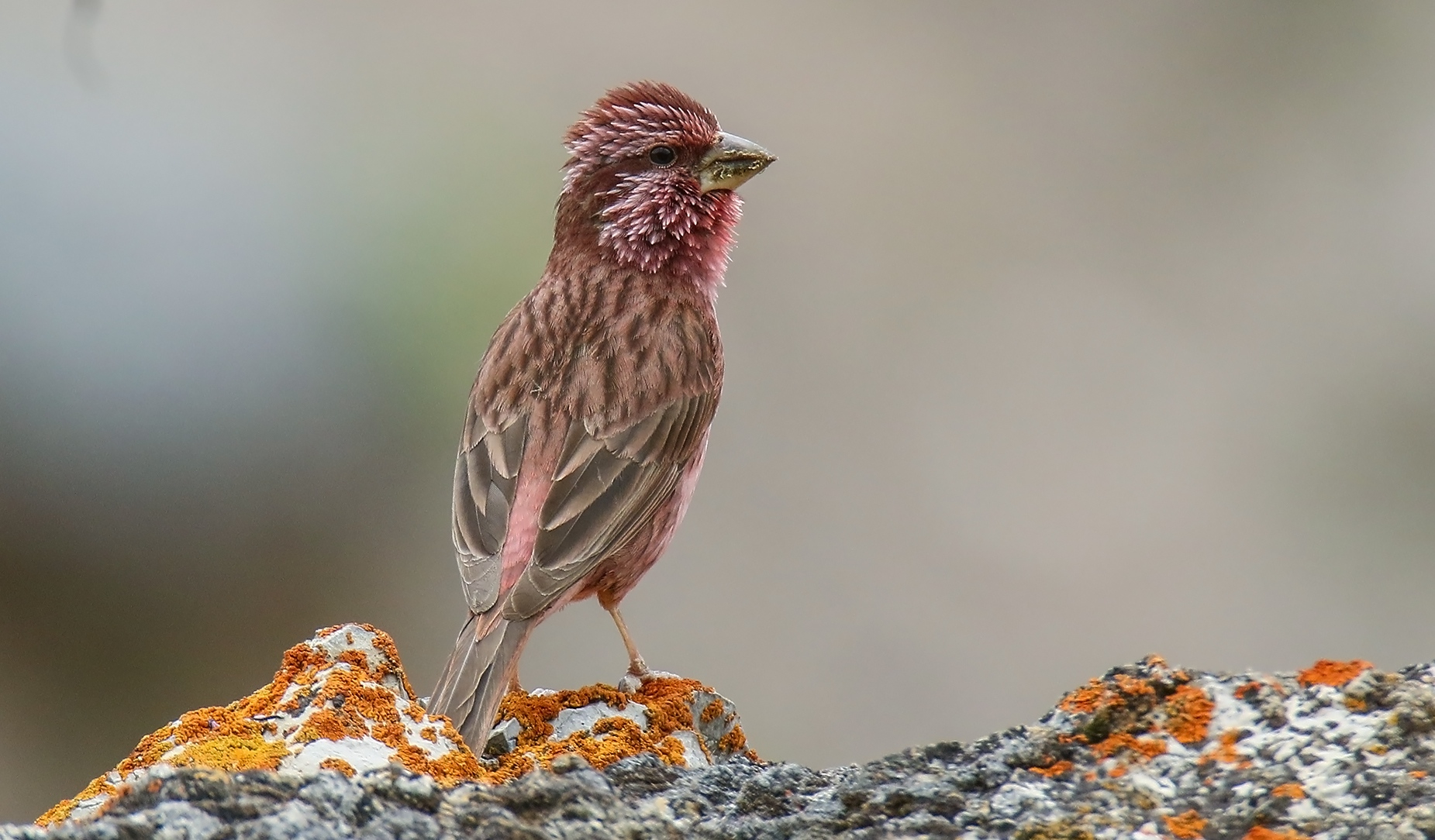

Scientific classification
- Kingdom: Animalia
- Phylum: Chordata
- Class: Aves
- Order: Passeriformes
- Family: Fringillidae
- Subfamily: Carduelinae
- Genus: Carpodacus
- Species: C. grandis

Binomial name
- Carpodacus grandis Blyth, 1849

Synonyms
- Carpodacus rhodochlamys grandis

= Blyth's rosefinch =

Species of bird

Blyth's rosefinch (Carpodacus grandis) or the Himalayan rosefinch is a species of finch in the family Fringillidae. It is found in northern Afghanistan to the western Himalayas. Its natural habitats are temperate forest and boreal shrubland. It is sometimes considered a subspecies of the red-mantled rosefinch.

The common name commemorates Edward Blyth (1810–1873), English zoologist and Curator of the Museum of the Asiatic Society of Bengal.
