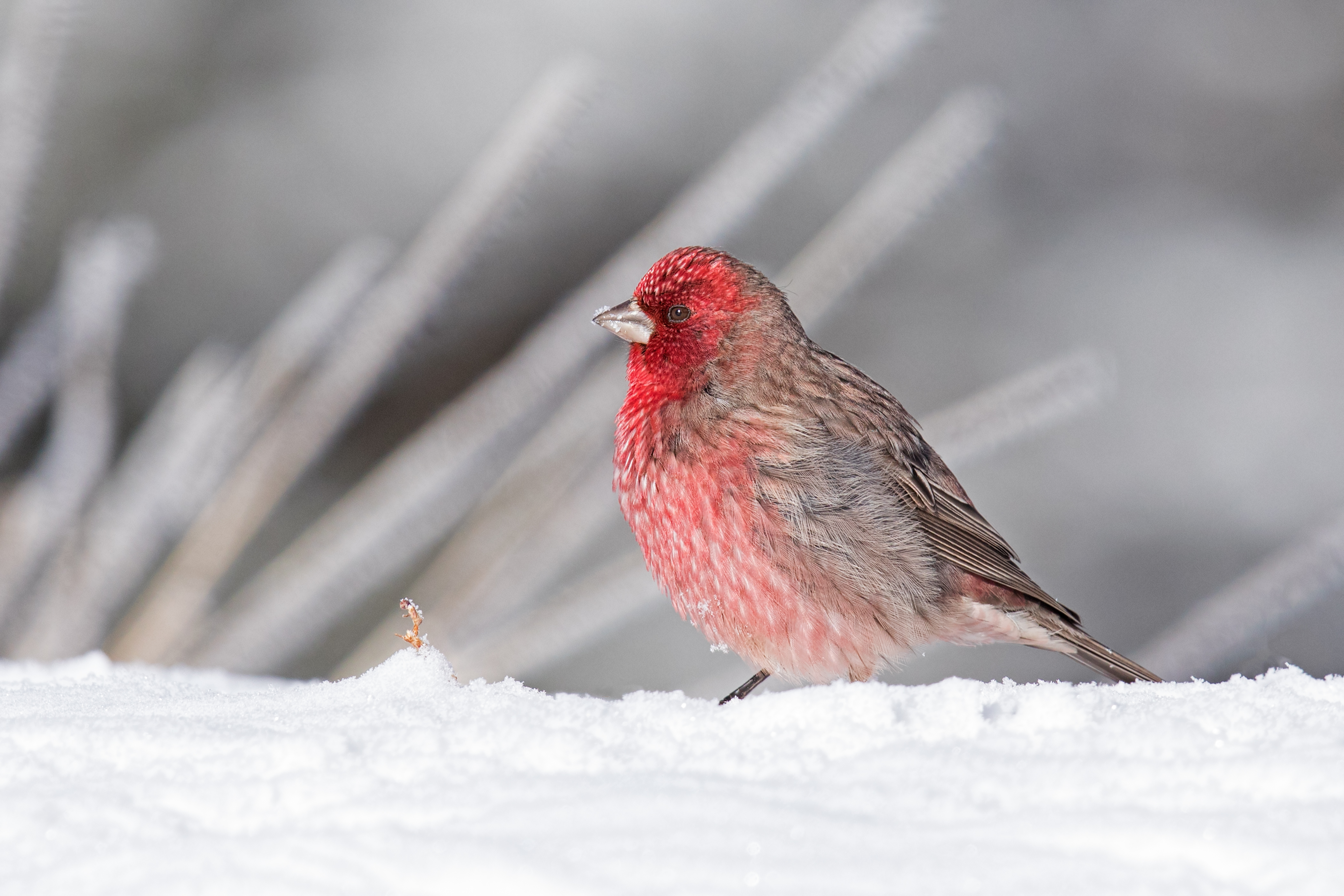

Conservation status
- Least Concern (IUCN 3.1)

Scientific classification
- Kingdom: Animalia
- Phylum: Chordata
- Class: Aves
- Order: Passeriformes
- Family: Fringillidae
- Subfamily: Carduelinae
- Genus: Carpodacus
- Species: C. rubicilloides

Binomial name
- Carpodacus rubicilloides Przewalski, 1876

= Streaked rosefinch =

Species of bird

The streaked rosefinch (Carpodacus rubicilloides) is a true finch species (family Fringillidae). It is found on the Himalayan Plateau. Its natural habitat is boreal shrubland.

Two subspecies are recognised:

- C. r. rubicilloides - eastern Tibet to central and southern China
- C. r. lucifer - southern Tibet and the Himalayas
