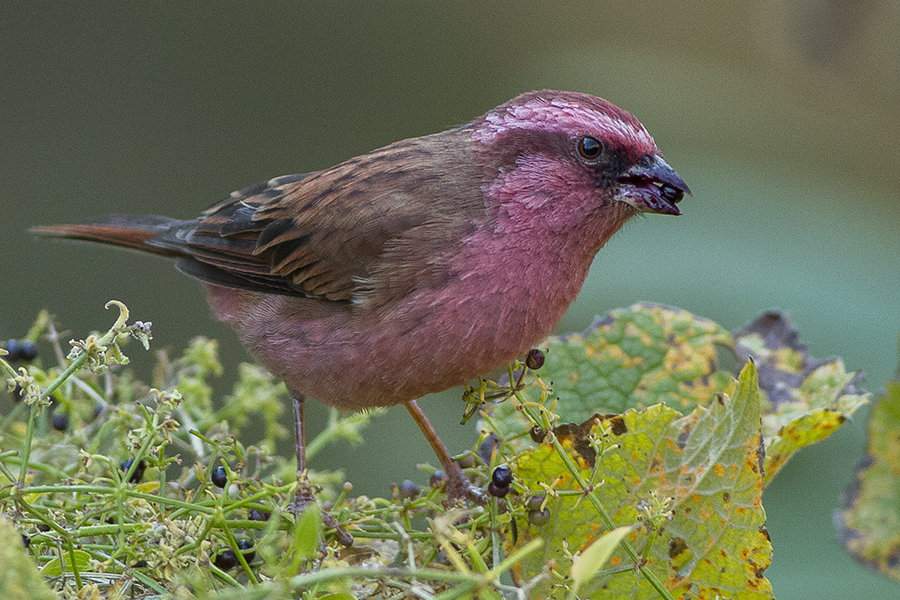
- Male from Nanda Devi National Park, Uttarakhand, India
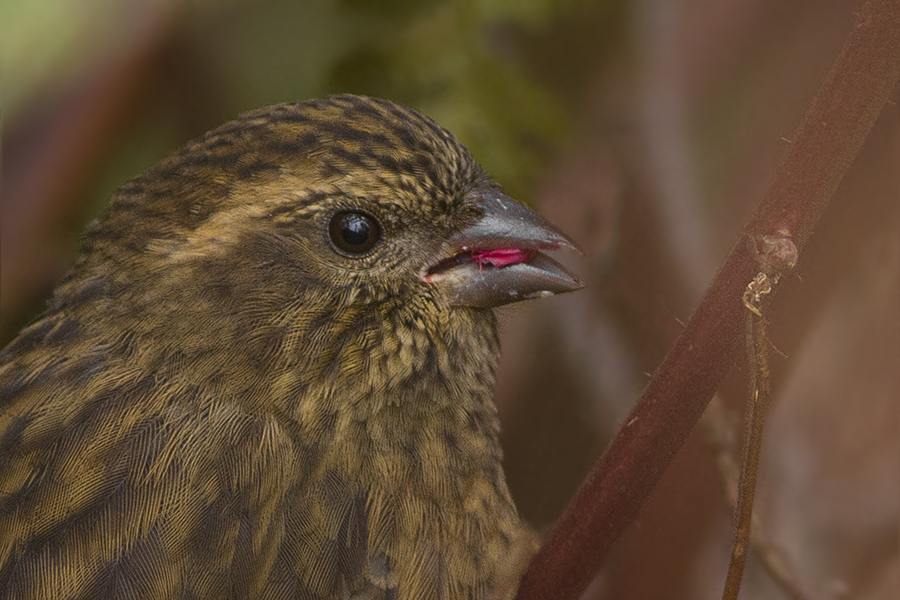
- Female from Pangolakha Wildlife Sanctuary, Sikkim, India

Conservation status
- Least Concern (IUCN 3.1)

Scientific classification
- Kingdom: Animalia
- Phylum: Chordata
- Class: Aves
- Order: Passeriformes
- Family: Fringillidae
- Subfamily: Carduelinae
- Genus: Carpodacus
- Species: C. rodochroa

Binomial name
- Carpodacus rodochroa (Vigors, 1831)

Synonyms
- Carpodacus rodochrous Vigors, 1831

= Pink-browed rosefinch =

Species of bird

The pink-browed rosefinch (Carpodacus rodochroa) is a finch in the family Fringillidae. Nicholas Aylward Vigors first described the species in 1831. It is migratory and ranges across the northern regions of the Indian subcontinent, mainly in the Himalayas. It is found in Bhutan, Tibet, India, Nepal, and Pakistan. Its natural habitats are boreal forests, shrub-lands, grasslands, and dry forests.

The male is bright raspberry pink with a "browed" facial pattern and faint streaking on the back. The females are brown with streaked buffy underparts, broad white eyebrows, and lightly streaked pale cheeks and throat. Having a stable population trend, the pink-browed Rosefinch is in no danger of extinction.

== Description ==
The pink-browed Rosefinch is a medium-sized bird, about 14-15 centimeters and 16-20 grams. It is a slender bird with a pointed beak, indented tail, and black eyes.

The male is a bright raspberry color with an eyestripe and "browed" facial patterns. The bird's underparts are a reddish brown color, and the breast and upper belly are mauve. The lower belly to the undertail is white or pale pin, and the legs are pale brown.

The female mostly lacks pink color, being a variety of streaked browns or blackish colors with only light streaks of pale pink. The back of the neck and head are a darker gray color. Instead of facial patterns like the male, the female has white eyebrows. The tale is dark brown, and there are streaks of dark brown on the lower throat.

A juvenile pink-browed Rosefinch looks more like a female than a male as a first-summer juvenile. It is more brown than pink. The second-winter male has reddish-brown upperparts with a little pale pink but heavy dark streaks on underparts.

== Habitat and Distribution ==
The pink-browed Rosefinch is a bird species in various habitats, including forests, shrublands, grasslands, and artificial/terrestrial environments. Its range spans South and East Asia, specifically Bhutan, China, India, Nepal, and Pakistan. This species is adapted to a wide range of elevations, with its upper elevation limit reaching 4,540 meters and its lower elevation limit being 1,800 meters.

== Migration and Movement ==
The pink-browed Rosefinch has a generation length of 4.1 years and a stable population trend. Classified as of least concern regarding extinction risk, this species undergoes a short-distance animal migration, moving seasonally between lower and higher altitudes.

== Breeding ==
Breeding occurs July through August. The female builds the nest from twigs, dry plant stems, fibers and grass, birch, moss, and animal hair. There are roughly 4–5 eggs that are turquoise-blue, unspotted, lightly spotted, or lined with black or reddish-brown and are incubated by the female.

== Behavior and Sounds ==
The pink-browed Rosefinch's song comes from the top of shrubs or low trees. It is a series of loud and upwardly toned whistles, "toowhi toowhi". The calls include loud "per-lee" or "chew-wee" and a "sweet" sound similar to that of Serinus canaria, also known as an Atlantic canary.

== Diet and Foraging ==
The pink-browed Rosefinch exhibits unique feeding behaviors and habitat preferences. It eats plants like Cyathula, Viburnum, and Ziziphus Mauritiana and feeds from the ground via hopping or shuffling. While finding food it also shows a preference for the edges of melting snow patches. These behaviors suggest adaptation to accessing food sources in its mountainous habitat.

== Gallery ==
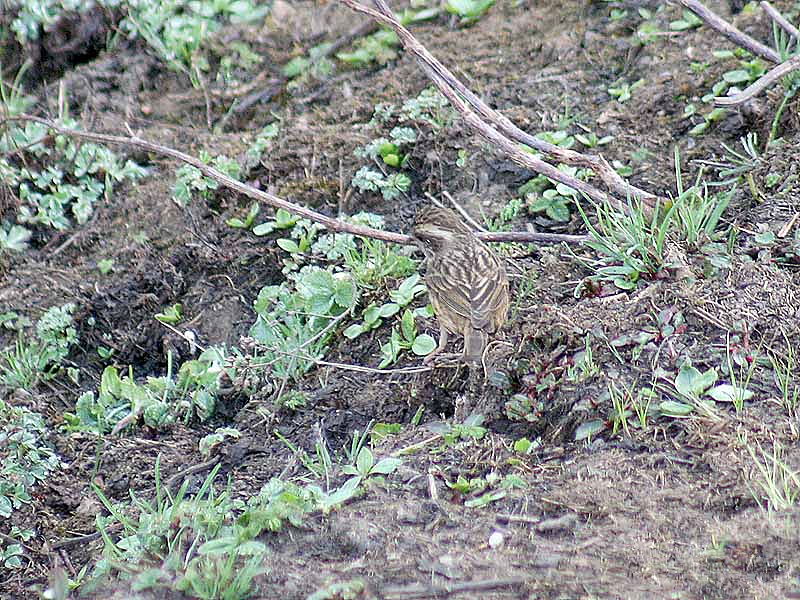
Female in Kullu - Manali district of Himachal Pradesh, India

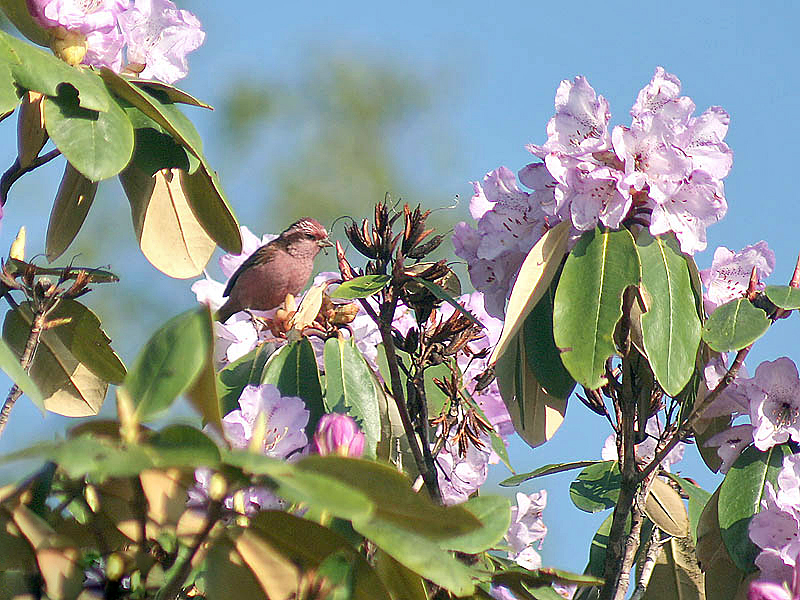
Male in Kullu

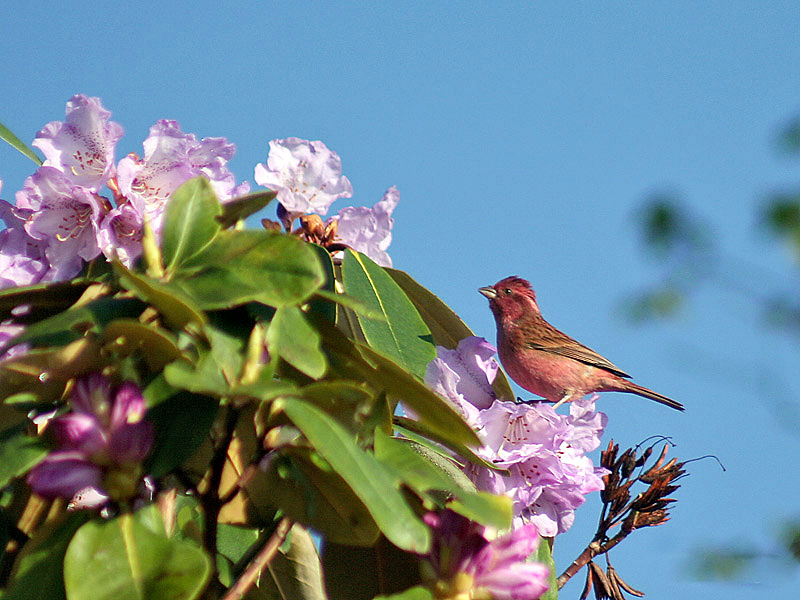
Male in Kullu

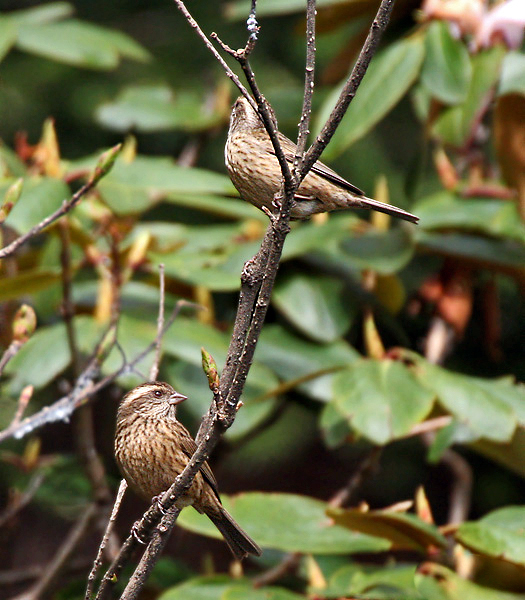
Females at 3,000 m (10,000 ft) in Kullu

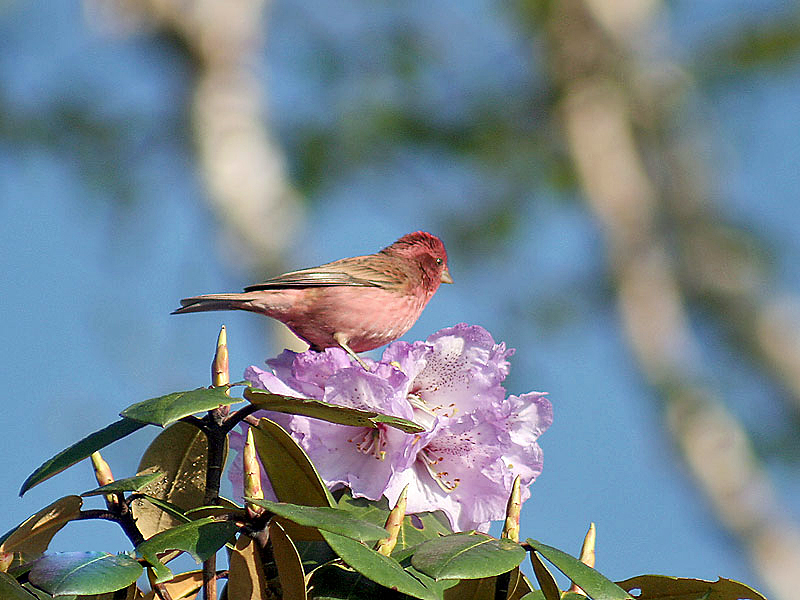
Male in Kullu

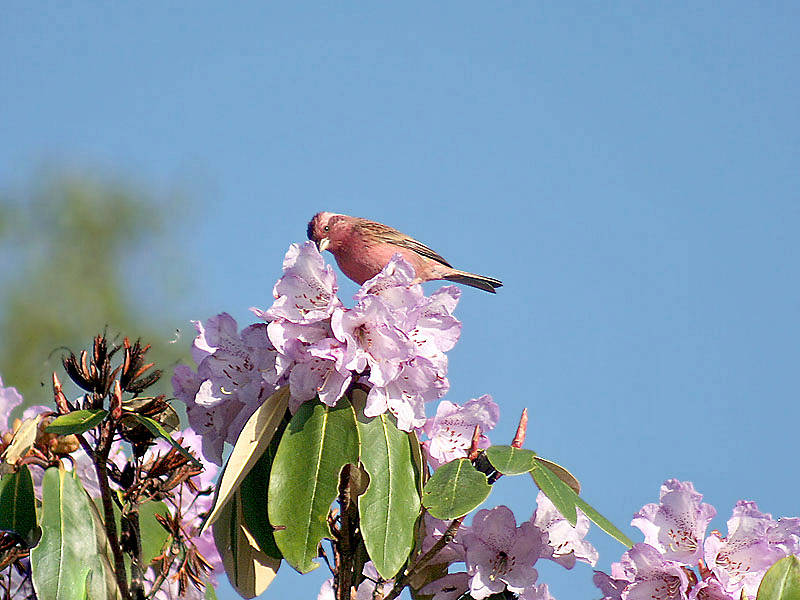
Male at 2,900 m (9,500 ft) in Kullu
