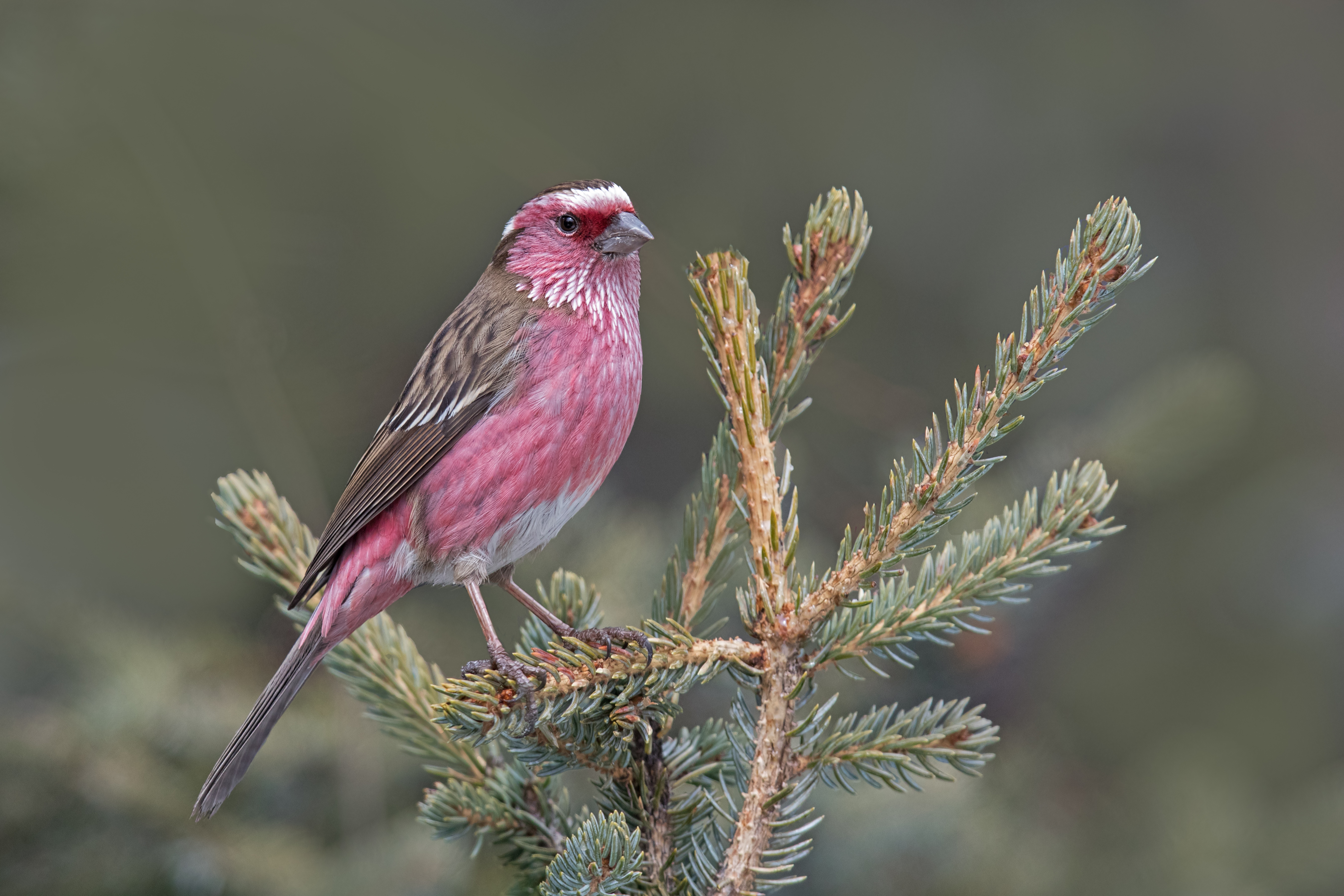

Conservation status
- Least Concern (IUCN 3.1)

Scientific classification
- Kingdom: Animalia
- Phylum: Chordata
- Class: Aves
- Order: Passeriformes
- Family: Fringillidae
- Subfamily: Carduelinae
- Genus: Carpodacus
- Species: C. dubius

Binomial name
- Carpodacus dubius Przevalski, 1876

= Chinese white-browed rosefinch =

Species of bird

The Chinese white-browed rosefinch (Carpodacus dubius) is a true finch species (family Fringillidae).

It is found in central China and eastern Tibet. Its natural habitats are temperate forests and temperate shrubland.

This species was at one time considered as a subspecies of the Himalayan white-browed rosefinch (Carpodacus thura) but was up-ranked to species status. This was supported by a phylogenetic analysis of DNA sequences.

== Description ==
The Chinese white-browed rosefinch has an average size between 9 and 25 cm in length. The male has a face and underside bright pink. The female is brown streaked all over with paler underparts. The beak is short and conical.

== Habitat and behavior ==
The Chinese white-browed rosefinch lives in central China and eastern Tibet. This species inhabits temperate forests, temperate shrublands, semi-open scrub, forests and forest edges at about 3000–4800 meters.

It usually hibernates in hilly, scrubby habitats, sometimes at lower elevations. The Chinese white-browed rosefinch is adapted to a granivorous diet, feeding on the ground in small groups.

It often emits a rapid series of nasal bleats.

== Reproduction ==
The nest is usually situated in a bush. It is a cup of twigs, grasses, mosses and shreds of birch bark lined internally with very fine grasses and hairs. It generally contains between 4 and 6 eggs.

== Subspecies ==
C. d. deserticolor: western China (northeastern Qinghai);

C. d. dubius: western China (south-eastern Qinghai to south-eastern Gansu, southern Ningxia and northern Sichuan);

C. d. femininus: south-east Tibet to south-west China (west Sichuan and north Yunnan).

== Conservation status ==
The population is stable, it is considered by the IUCN as "least concern".
