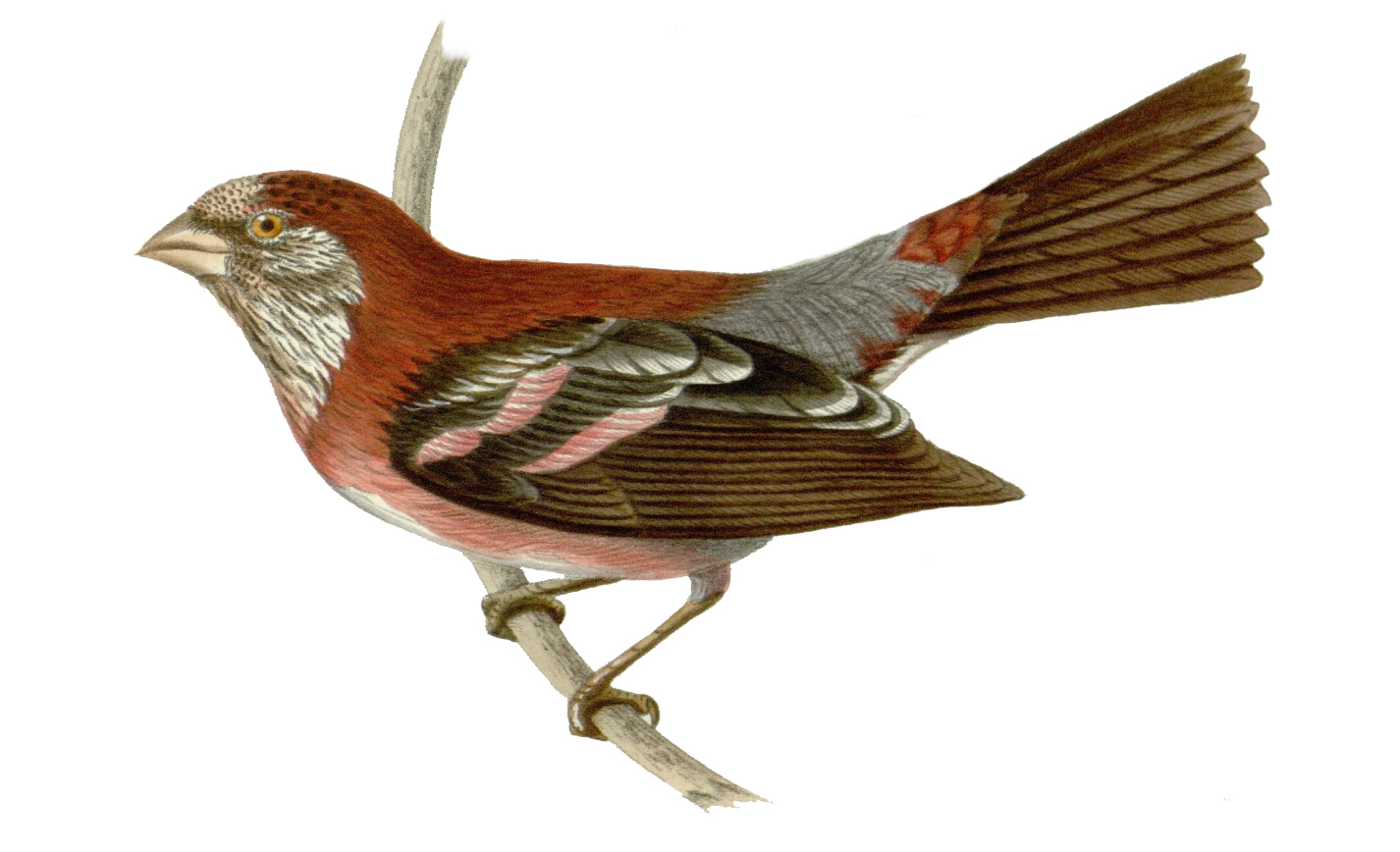

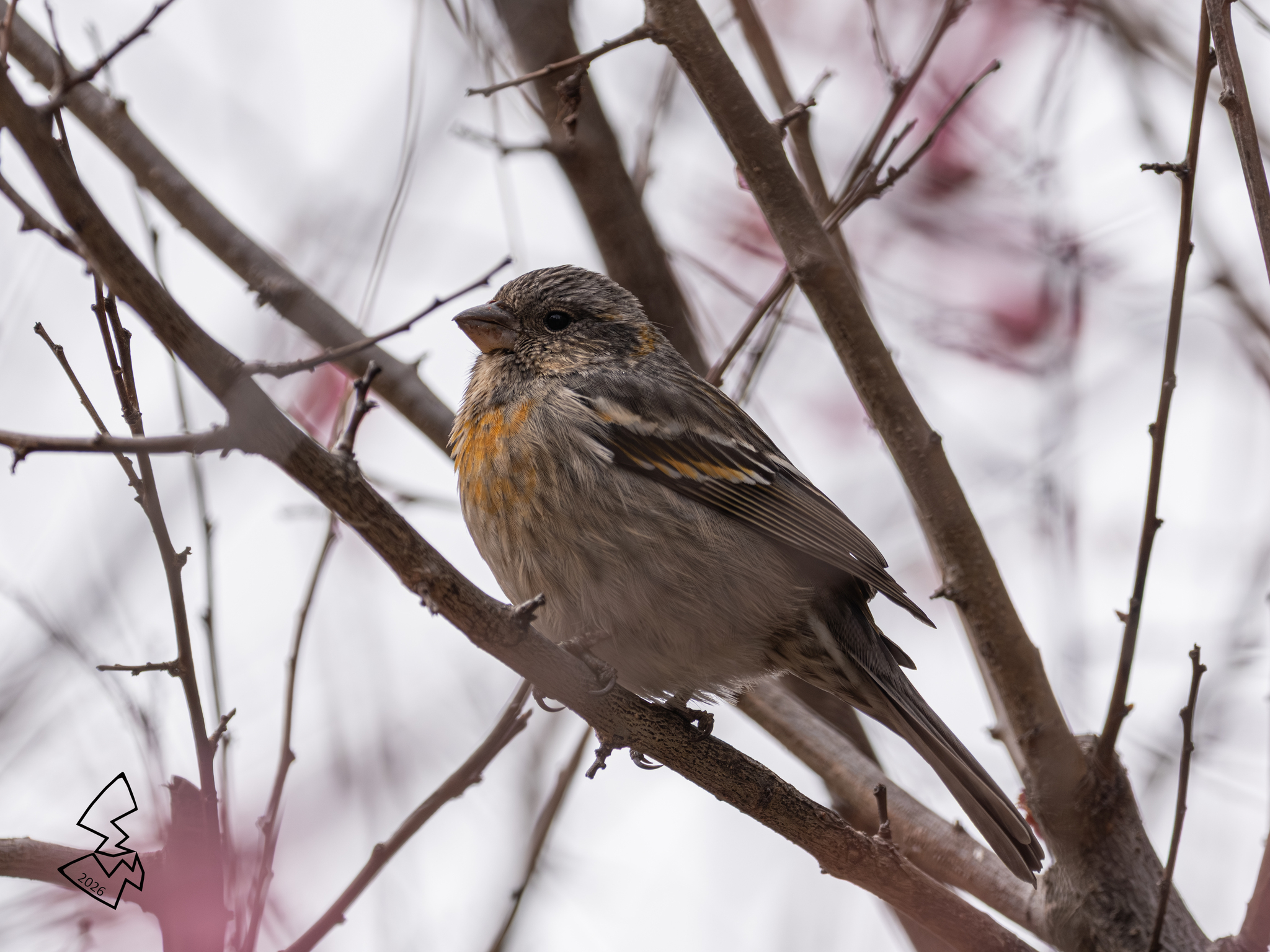

Conservation status
- Least Concern (IUCN 3.1)

Scientific classification
- Kingdom: Animalia
- Phylum: Chordata
- Class: Aves
- Order: Passeriformes
- Family: Fringillidae
- Subfamily: Carduelinae
- Genus: Carpodacus
- Species: C. trifasciatus

Binomial name
- Carpodacus trifasciatus Verreaux, 1871

= Three-banded rosefinch =

Species of bird

The three-banded rosefinch (Carpodacus trifasciatus) is a species of finch in the family Fringillidae.

It is found in central China. It's natural habitat is in temperate forests.
