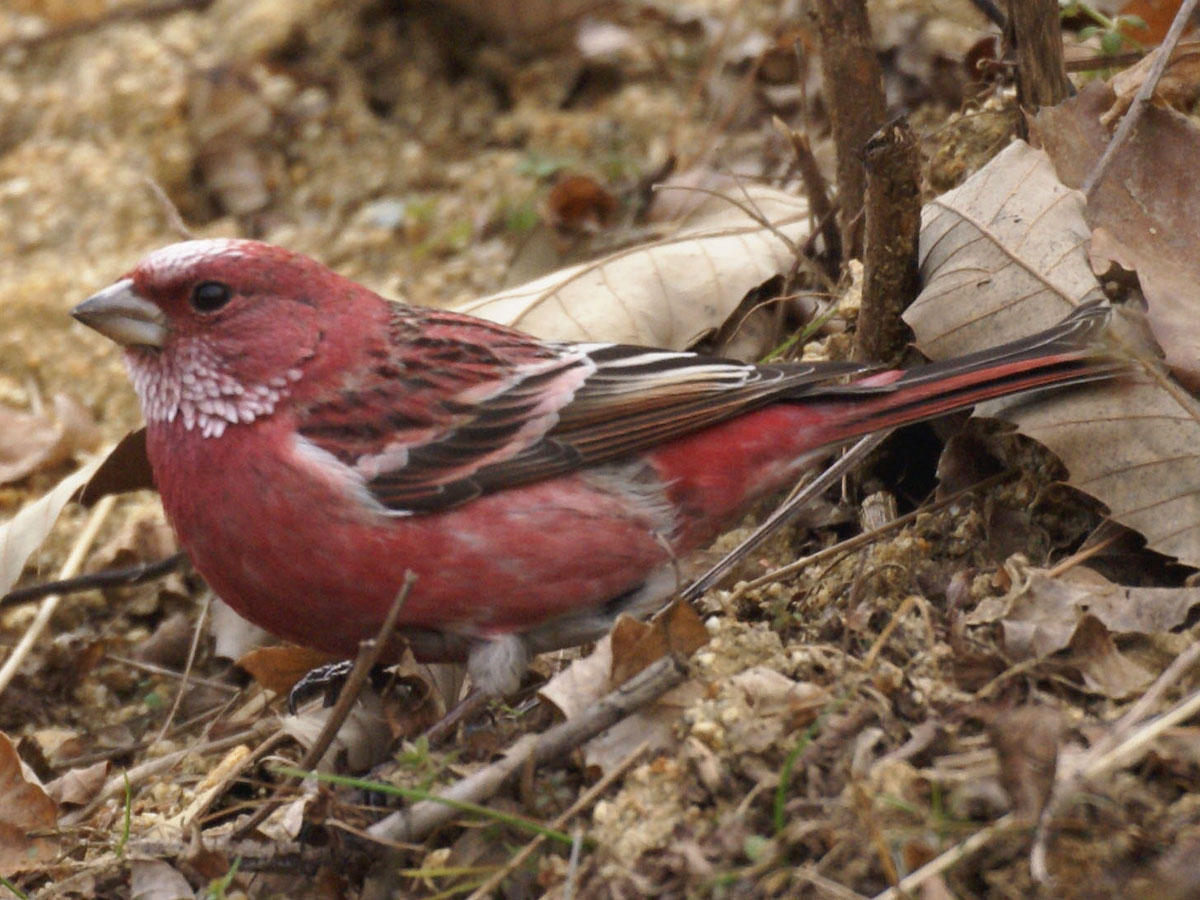

Conservation status
- Least Concern (IUCN 3.1)

Scientific classification
- Kingdom: Animalia
- Phylum: Chordata
- Class: Aves
- Order: Passeriformes
- Family: Fringillidae
- Subfamily: Carduelinae
- Genus: Carpodacus
- Species: C. roseus

Binomial name
- Carpodacus roseus (Pallas, 1776)

= Pallas's rosefinch =

Species of bird

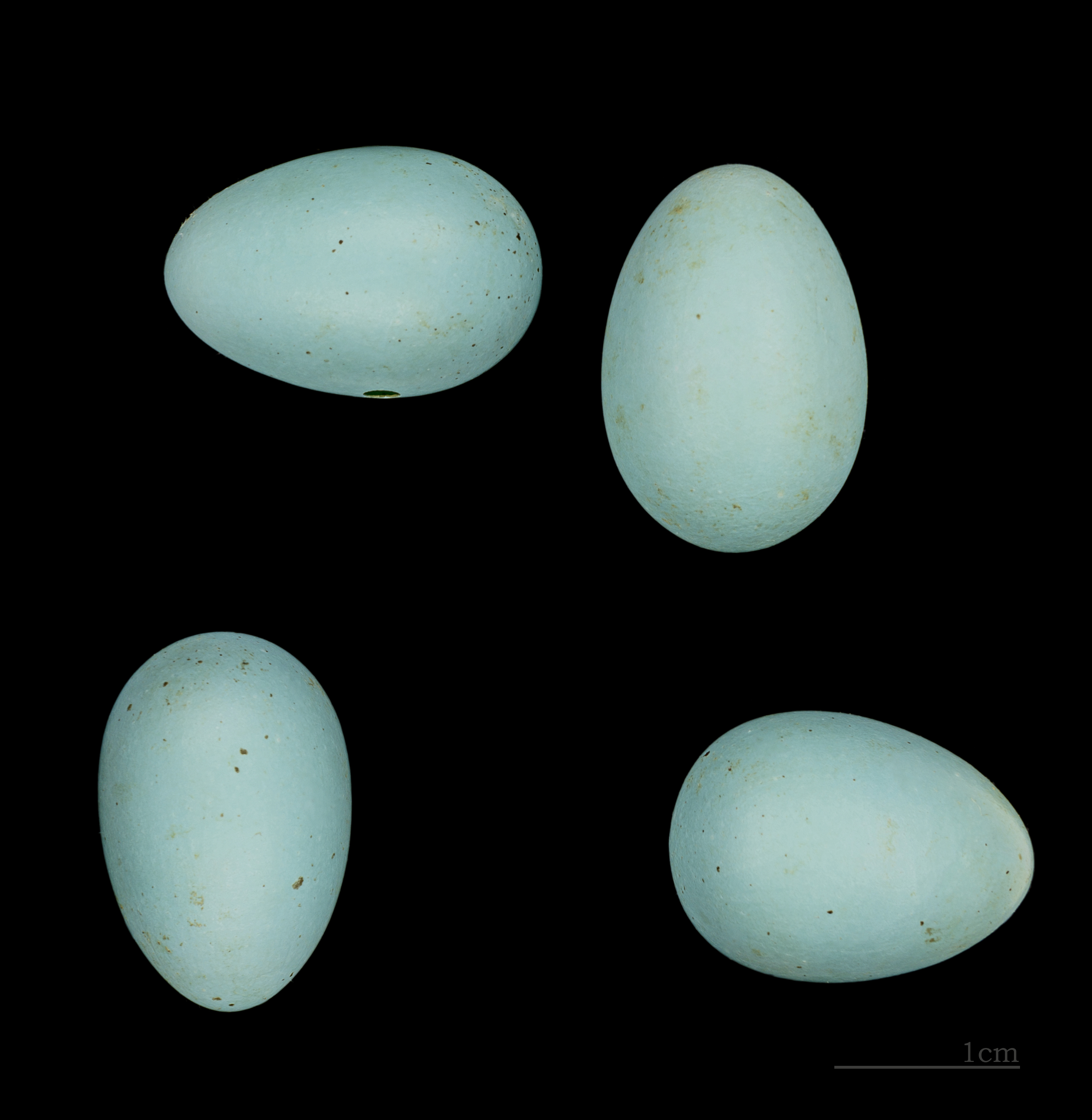
Eggs of Carpodacus roseus MHNT

Pallas's rosefinch (Carpodacus roseus) is a species of bird in the finch family Fringillidae. It is found in China, Japan, Kazakhstan, Korea, Mongolia, and Russia. Birds are occasionally reported from further west and there are records from several European regions, including Britain, but the cage-bird trade makes the origin of some such birds hard to assess. Its natural habitats are boreal forests and boreal shrubland.

== Description ==
Pallas's rosefinch is around 16–17.5 cm in length. It is a medium-sized to large slender rosefinch with a long notched tail. Like many other finches, it has a short grayish bill used most often for eating seeds. An adult male has a rose red breast and head, with white spots on the crown and throat. Female is mostly brown with a white belly, a streaked breast, and an reddish-brown head. They both have pale wingbars.

== Range ==
They're found throughout Central and Southeastern Russia, Mongolia, and China and Japan in the non-breeding season. They rarely travel to Europe or the Americas, but cases have been noted.
