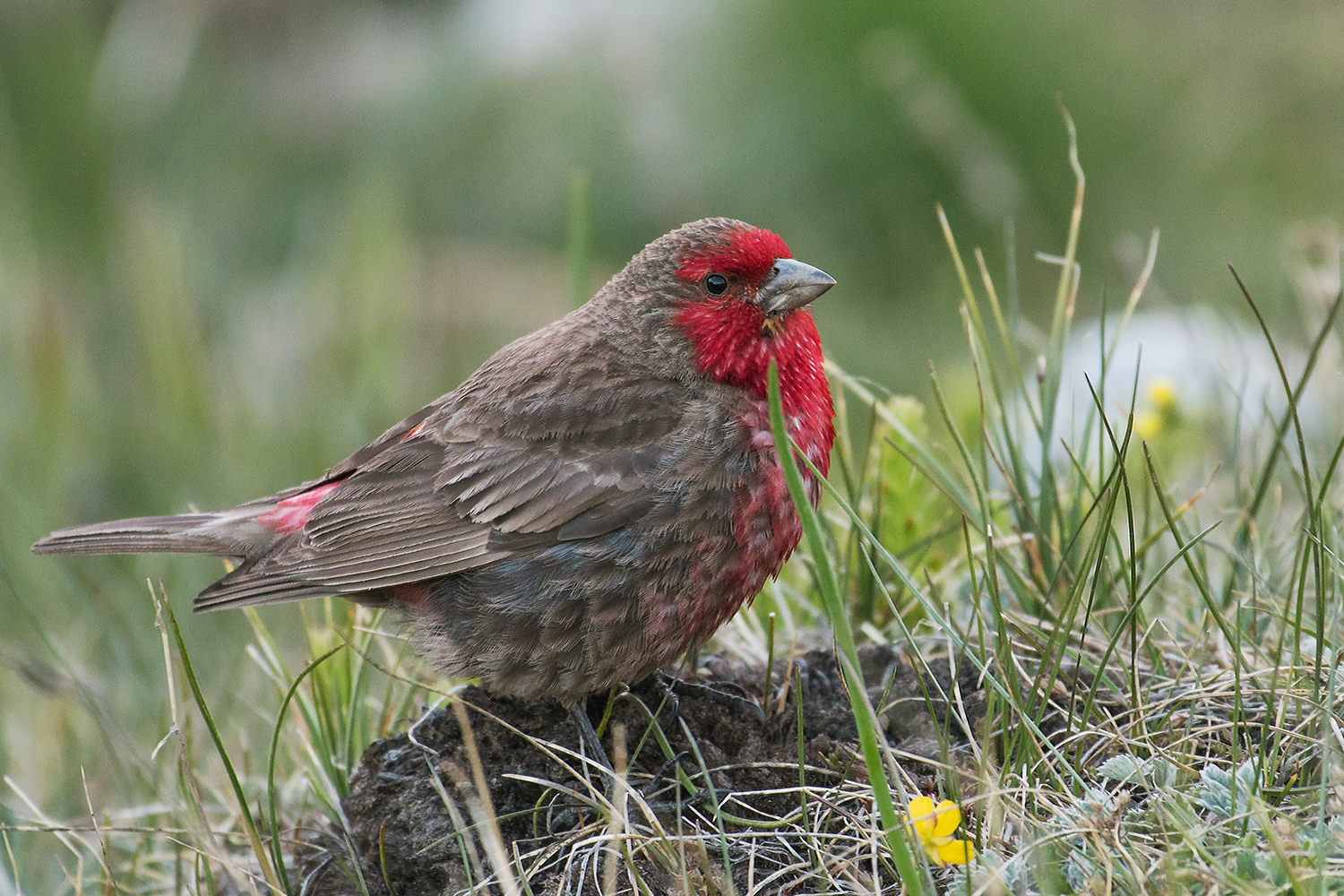

Conservation status
- Least Concern (IUCN 3.1)

Scientific classification
- Kingdom: Animalia
- Phylum: Chordata
- Class: Aves
- Order: Passeriformes
- Family: Fringillidae
- Subfamily: Carduelinae
- Genus: Carpodacus
- Species: C. puniceus

Binomial name
- Carpodacus puniceus (Blyth, 1845)

Synonyms
- Pyrrhospiza punicea

= Red-fronted rosefinch =

Species of bird

The red-fronted rosefinch (Carpodacus Puniceus) is a species of rosefinch in the finch family Fringillidae. It is sometimes placed in the monotypic genus Pyrrhospiza. found in Afghanistan, Bhutan, China, India, Kazakhstan, Nepal, Pakistan, Russia, Tajikistan, and Turkmenistan. Its natural habitat is montane tundra.
