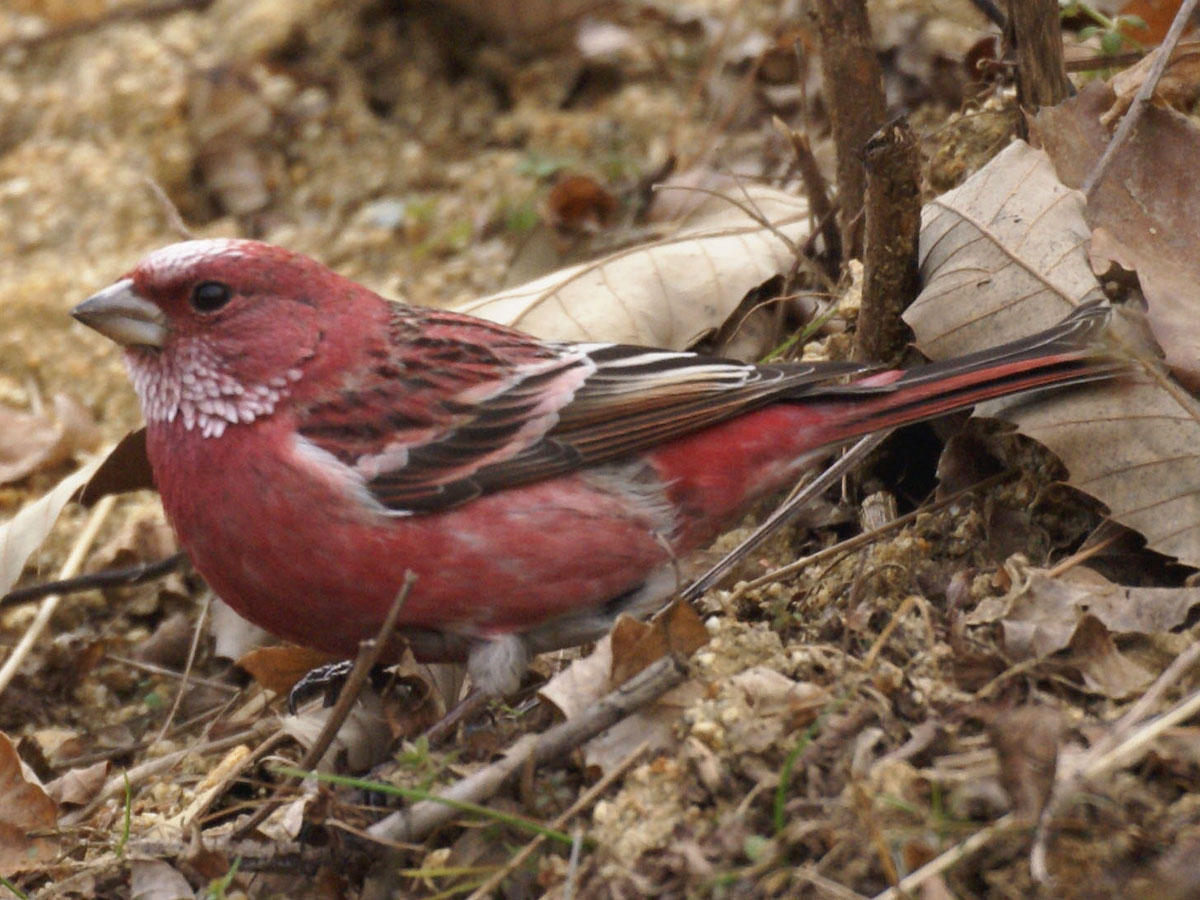
- Pallas's rosefinch (Carpodacus roseus)

Scientific classification
- Kingdom: Animalia
- Phylum: Chordata
- Class: Aves
- Order: Passeriformes
- Family: Fringillidae
- Subfamily: Carduelinae
- Genus: Carpodacus; Kaup, 1829

Type species
- Fringilla rosea Pallas, 1776

Species
- See text.

= Rosefinch =

Rosefinches

Genus of birds

The rosefinches are a genus, Carpodacus, of passerine birds in the finch family Fringillidae. Most are called "rosefinches" and as the word implies, have various shades of red in their plumage. The common rosefinch is frequently called the "rosefinch". The genus name is from the Ancient Greek terms karpos, "fruit", and dakno, "to bite".

The Carpodacus rosefinches occur throughout Eurasia, but the greatest diversity is found in the Sino-Himalayas suggesting that the species originated in this region.

== Taxonomy ==
The genus Carpodacus was introduced in 1829 by the German naturalist Johann Jakob Kaup. The type species was designated by George Gray in 1842 as Fringilla rosea Pallas, 1776, Pallas's rosefinch. The genus name combines the Ancient Greek karpos meaning "fruit" with dakos meaning "biter".

In 2012, Zuccon and colleagues published a comprehensive molecular phylogenetic analysis of the finch family. Based both on their own results and those published earlier by other groups, they proposed a series of changes to the taxonomy. They found that the three North American rosefinches, namely Cassin's finch, purple finch, and house finch, formed a separate clade that was not closely related to the Palearctic rosefinches. They proposed moving the three species to a separate genus Haemorhous. This proposal was accepted by the International Ornithological Committee and the American Ornithologists' Union. Zuccon and colleagues also found that the common rosefinch (Carpodacus erythrinus) fell outside the core rosefinch clade and was a sister to the scarlet finch (at the time Haematospiza sipahi). They recommended that the common rosefinch should be moved to a new monotypic genus with the resurrected name of Erythrina. The British Ornithologists' Union accepted this proposal, but the International Ornithological Union chose instead to adopt a more inclusive Carpodacus which incorporated Haematospiza as well as the monotypic genus Chaunoproctus containing the extinct Bonin grosbeak. The long-tailed rosefinch that had previously been included in the monotypic genus Uragus was also moved into Carpodacus.

Two species that were formerly included in the genus, Blanford's rosefinch and the dark-breasted rosefinch, were shown to not be closely related to the other species in the group. They were moved to separate monotypic genera, Blanford's rosefinch to Agraphospiza and the dark-breasted rosefinch to Procarduelis. Sillem's rosefinch originally had the common name "Sillem's mountain finch" and was assigned to the genus Leucosticte but a phylogenetic analysis using mitochondrial DNA sequences published in 2016 found that the species belonged to the genus Carpodacus.

There have been a number of rosefinch radiations. First to split off were the ancestors of the North American species, the common rosefinch, and the scarlet finch, generally placed in its own genus. These groups, which may be related, diverged in the Middle Miocene (about 14–12 mya) from the proto-rosefinches. Each of these groups probably should constitute a distinct genus; in the case of the North American species, this is Haemorhous. The types of the genera Erythrina Brehm 1829 and Carpodacus Kaup 1829 are frequently considered to be the common rosefinch, but both refer to Pallas's rosefinch.

Molecular phylogenetic studies have shown that Hawaiian honeycreepers are closely related to the rosefinches in the genus Carpodacus. The most recent common ancestor has been variously estimate at 7.24 million years ago (mya) and 15.71 mya.

Przewalski's "rosefinch" (Urocynchramus pylzowi) has been determined to be not a rosefinch, and indeed not a true finch at all, but to constitute a monotypic family Urocynchramidae.

== Species ==
The genus Carpodacus contains 28 species. They all include 'rosefinch' in their English names apart from the scarlet finch, the crimson-browed finch and the extinct Bonin grosbeak.

Image	Common name	Scientific name	Distribution
	Common rosefinch	Carpodacus erythrinus	Asia and Europe.
	Scarlet finch	Carpodacus sipahi	the Himalayas from Uttarakhand state in the Indian Himalayas eastwards across Nepal, stretching further east to the adjacent hills of Northeast India and Southeast Asia as far south as Thailand.
	†Bonin grosbeak	Carpodacus ferreorostris (extinct)	Chichi-jima in the Ogasawara Islands.
	Streaked rosefinch	Carpodacus rubicilloides	Bhutan, China, India, and Nepal.
	Great rosefinch	Carpodacus rubicilla	Afghanistan, Azerbaijan, Georgia, Kazakhstan, Kyrgyzstan, Mongolia, Pakistan, Russia, Tajikistan, and Uzbekistan and east to China
	Blyth's rosefinch	Carpodacus grandis	northern Afghanistan to the western Himalayas.
	Red-mantled rosefinch	Carpodacus rhodochlamys	in Afghanistan, China, India, Kazakhstan, Mongolia, Pakistan, Russia, and Tajikistan.
	Himalayan beautiful rosefinch	Carpodacus pulcherrimus	mid-western China and the northern Himalayas.
	Chinese beautiful rosefinch	Carpodacus davidianus	China
	Pink-rumped rosefinch	Carpodacus waltoni	central China and eastern Tibet
	Pink-browed rosefinch	Carpodacus rodochroa	Bhutan, Tibet, India, Nepal, and Pakistan.
	Dark-rumped rosefinch	Carpodacus edwardsii	Bhutan, China, India, Myanmar, and Nepal.
	Spot-winged rosefinch	Carpodacus rodopeplus	India and Nepal
	Sharpe's rosefinch	Carpodacus verreauxii	central China and far northern Myanmar.
	Vinaceous rosefinch	Carpodacus vinaceus	Nepal, China and far northern Myanmar.
	Taiwan rosefinch	Carpodacus formosanus	Taiwan
	Sinai rosefinch	Carpodacus synoicus	Egypt, Israel, Jordan, and Saudi Arabia.
	Pale rosefinch	Carpodacus stoliczkae	Afghanistan and China
	Tibetan rosefinch	Carpodacus roborowskii	Xinjiang Autonomous Region.
	Sillem's rosefinch	Carpodacus sillemi	China, Japan, Kazakhstan, North Korea, South Korea, and Russia.
	Siberian long-tailed rosefinch	Carpodacus sibiricus	Japan, Kazakhstan, North Korea, South Korea, Mongolia, and Russia.
	Chinese long-tailed rosefinch	Carpodacus lepidus	China
	Pallas's rosefinch	Carpodacus roseus	China, Japan, Kazakhstan, North Korea, South Korea, Mongolia, and Russia.
	Three-banded rosefinch	Carpodacus trifasciatus	central China and far northeastern India.
	Himalayan white-browed rosefinch	Carpodacus thura	Afghanistan, Bhutan, India, Nepal, and Pakistan.
	Chinese white-browed rosefinch	Carpodacus dubius	central China and eastern Tibet.
	Red-fronted rosefinch	Carpodacus puniceus	Afghanistan, Bhutan, China, India, Kazakhstan, Nepal, Pakistan, Russia, Tajikistan, and Turkmenistan
	Crimson-browed finch	Carpodacus subhimachalus	Bhutan, China, India, Myanmar, and Nepal.
