= Siberian long-tailed rosefinch =

Conservation status
- Least Concern (IUCN 3.1)

Scientific classification
- Kingdom: Animalia
- Phylum: Chordata
- Class: Aves
- Order: Passeriformes
- Family: Fringillidae
- Subfamily: Carduelinae
- Genus: Carpodacus
- Species: C. sibiricus

Binomial name
- Carpodacus sibiricus (Pallas, 1773)

Species of bird

The Siberian long-tailed rosefinch (Carpodacus sibiricus) is a species of finch of the family Fringillidae.

It is found in Japan, Kazakhstan, North Korea, South Korea, and Russia. Its natural habitats are temperate forests, subtropical or tropical moist shrubland, and temperate grassland.

It is a very rare vagrant to Europe, but like several related Asiatic rosefinches, is reasonably frequent in the cage bird trade, so many records have been considered to relate to escapes.

== Taxonomy ==
The Siberian long-tailed rosefinch was formerly placed in the genus Uragus, but was moved to Carpodacus based on the results of phylogenetic analyses of mitochondrial and nuclear DNA sequences.

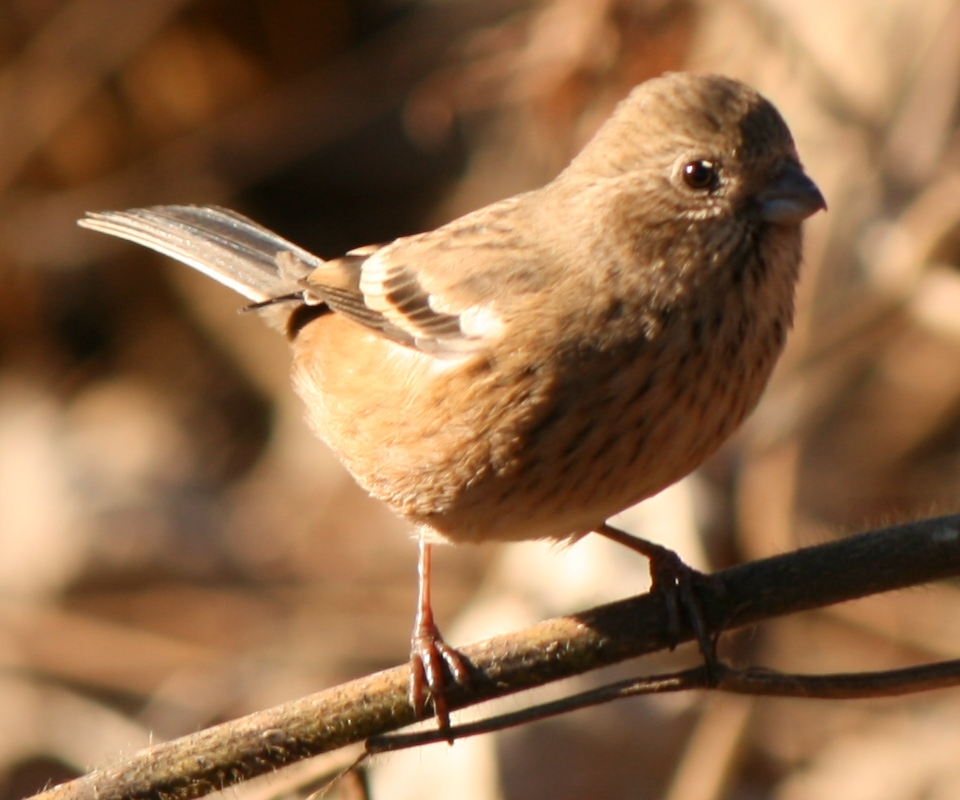
female in Japan

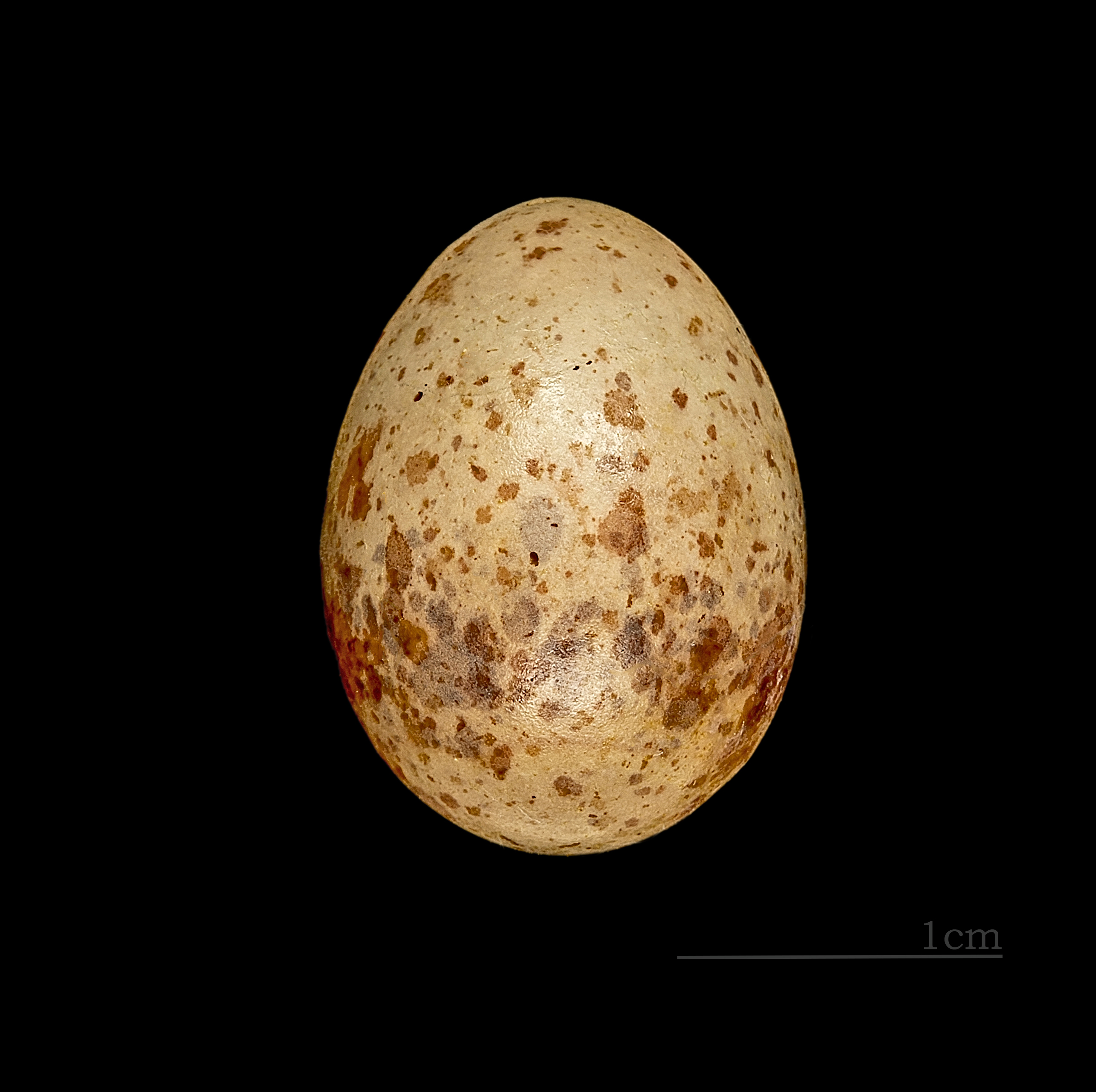
Egg - MHNT
