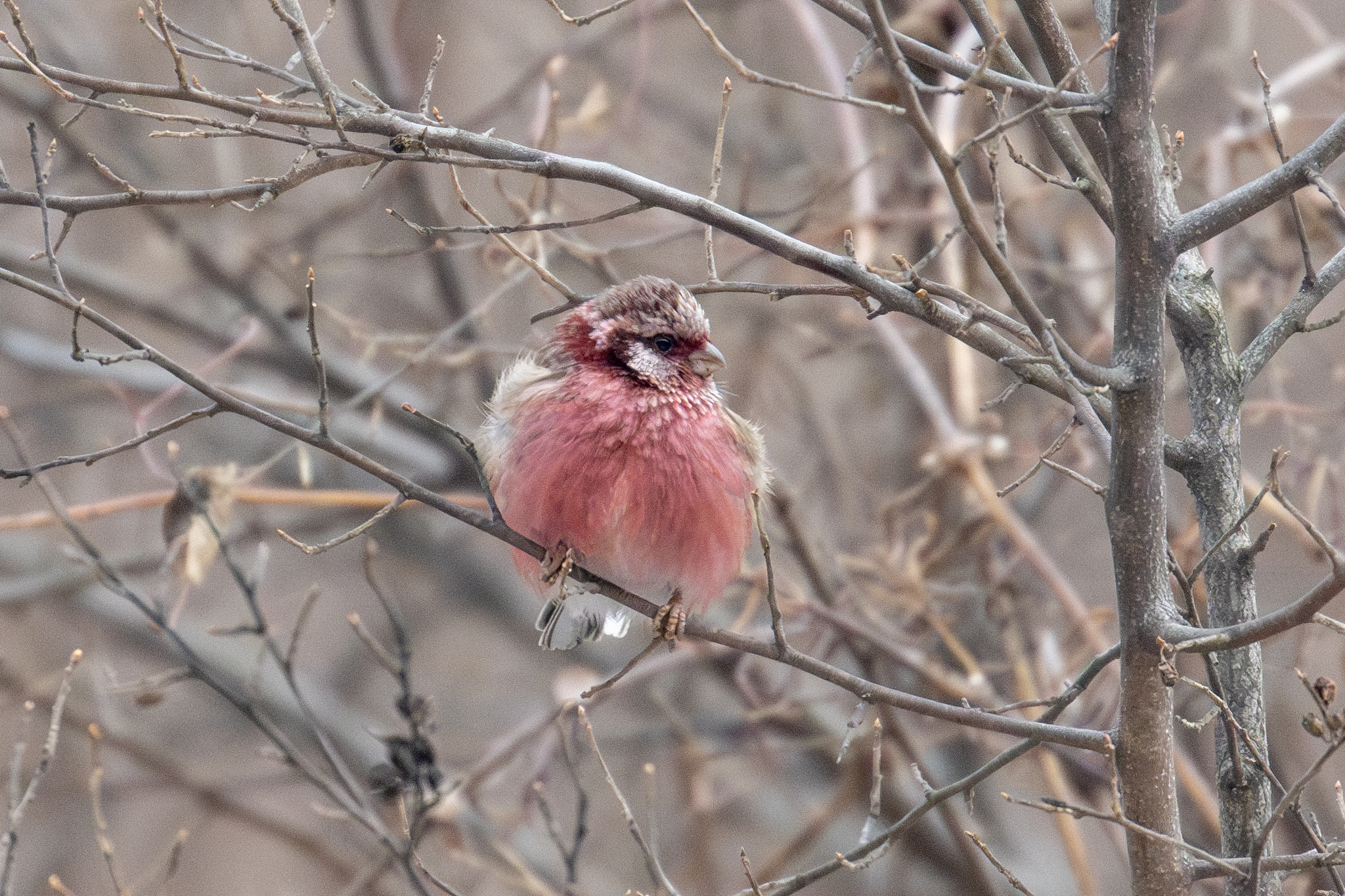

Scientific classification
- Kingdom: Animalia
- Phylum: Chordata
- Class: Aves
- Order: Passeriformes
- Family: Fringillidae
- Subfamily: Carduelinae
- Genus: Carpodacus
- Species: C. lepidus

Binomial name
- Carpodacus lepidus (David, A & Oustalet, 1877)

= Chinese long-tailed rosefinch =

Species of bird

The Chinese long-tailed rosefinch (Carpodacus lepidus) is a species of finch of the family Fringillidae.

It is found in China. Its natural habitats are temperate forests, subtropical or tropical moist shrubland, and temperate grassland.
