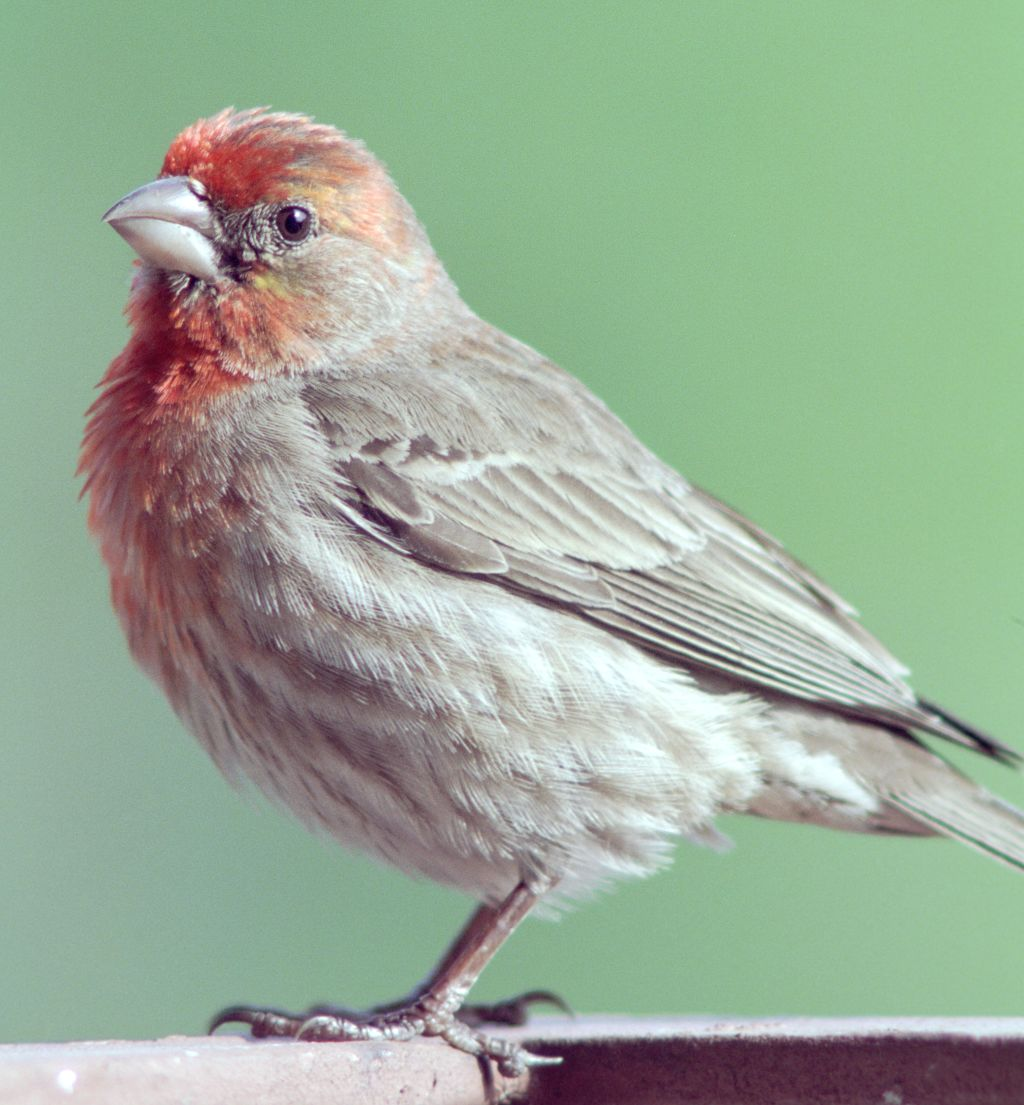
- House finch (Haemorhous mexicanus)

Scientific classification
- Kingdom: Animalia
- Phylum: Chordata
- Class: Aves
- Order: Passeriformes
- Family: Fringillidae
- Subfamily: Carduelinae
- Genus: Haemorhous; Swainson, 1837

Type species
- Fringilla purpurea Gmelin, 1789

Species
- See text

= American rosefinch =

American rosefinches

Genus of birds

The American rosefinches that form the genus Haemorhous are a group of passerine birds in the finch family Fringillidae. As the name implies ("haemo" means "blood" in Greek), various shades of red are characteristic plumage colors of this group. They are found throughout the North American continent.

The genus is not closely related to the Carpodacus rosefinches that are found in Europe and Asia.

== Systematics ==
There have been a number of rosefinch radiations. One of the first to split off were the ancestors of the North American species and diverged in the Middle Miocene (about 14–12 mya) from the proto-rosefinches.

Within the genus the house finch is the outgroup, with purple and Cassin's finches more closely related to one another, than either is to the house finch.

== Species ==
The genus contains the following three species:

Genus Haemorhous – Swainson, 1837 – two species
Common name	Scientific name and subspecies	Range	Size and ecology	IUCN status and estimated population
Cassin's finch Male Female	Haemorhous cassinii (Baird, 1854)	western North America as far south as northern New Mexico and Arizona; also Southern California near Baja California.	Size: Habitat: Diet:	LC
Purple finch Male Female	Haemorhous purpureus (Gmelin, 1789) Two subspecies: H. p. purpureus (Gmelin, JF, 1789); H. p. californicus (Baird, SF, 1858)	Canada and the northeastern United States	Size: Habitat: Diet:	LC
House finch Male Female	Haemorhous mexicanus (Müller, 1776)	North America from southern Canada to the Mexican state of Oaxaca	Size: Habitat: Diet:	LC
