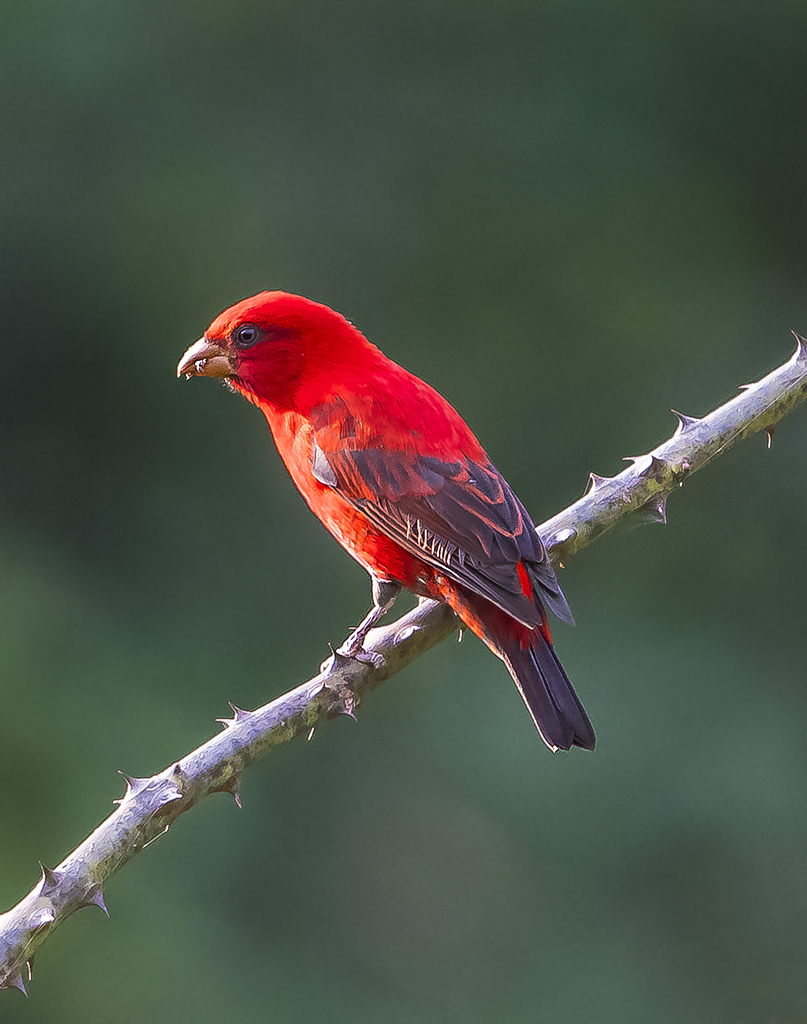
- Male in Uttarakhand, India

Conservation status
- Least Concern (IUCN 3.1)

Scientific classification
- Kingdom: Animalia
- Phylum: Chordata
- Class: Aves
- Order: Passeriformes
- Family: Fringillidae
- Subfamily: Carduelinae
- Genus: Carpodacus
- Species: C. sipahi

Binomial name
- Carpodacus sipahi (Hodgson, 1836)
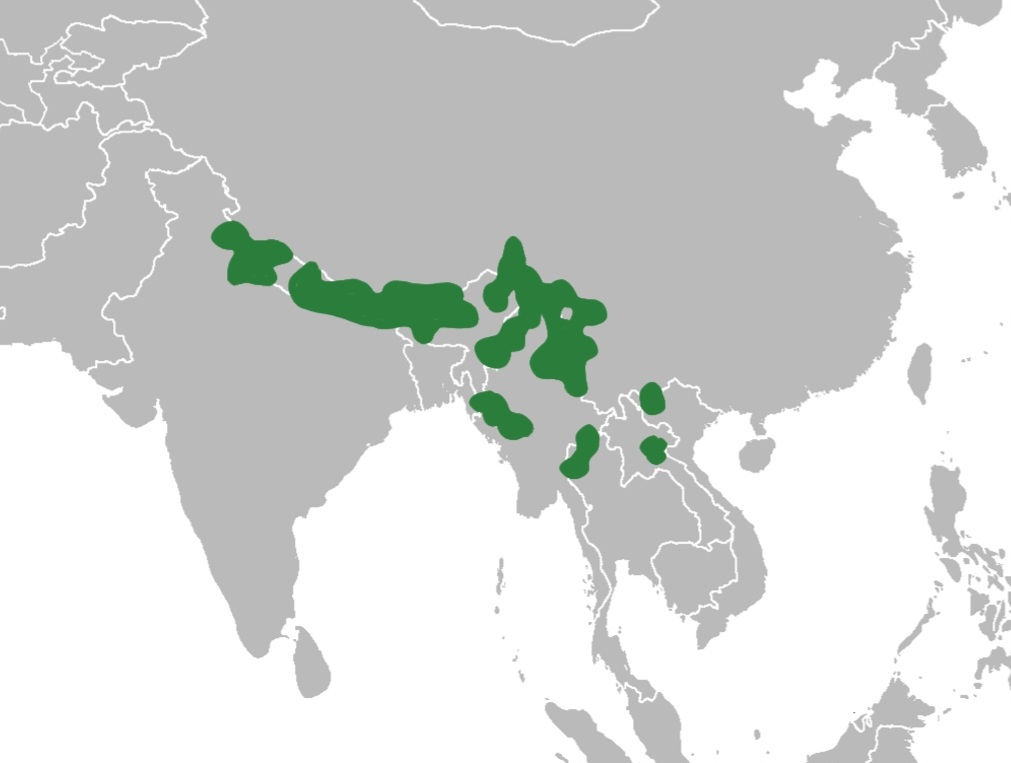
- Distribution map of the Scarlet finch

Synonyms
- Haematospiza sipahi Erythrina sipahi

= Scarlet finch =

Species of bird

The scarlet finch (Carpodacus sipahi) is a small passerine bird in the finch family Fringillidae. It is found in the Himalayas from Uttarakhand state in the Indian Himalayas eastwards across Nepal, stretching further east to the adjacent hills of Northeast India and Southeast Asia as far south as Thailand. It is resident in the Himalayas, but many birds winter to the immediate south. Its natural habitat is temperate forests.

It was described by the British naturalist Brian Houghton Hodgson in 1836 under the binomial name Corythus sipahi. The species name sipahi comes from the Hindustani word sipāhi for a soldier or the Anglicised form sepoy, for the red uniform worn by those in the employment of the East India Company.

The scarlet finch was formerly placed in the monotypic genus Haematospiza but was moved to the rosefinch genus Carpodacus based on the results of molecular phylogenetic studies.

== Gallery ==
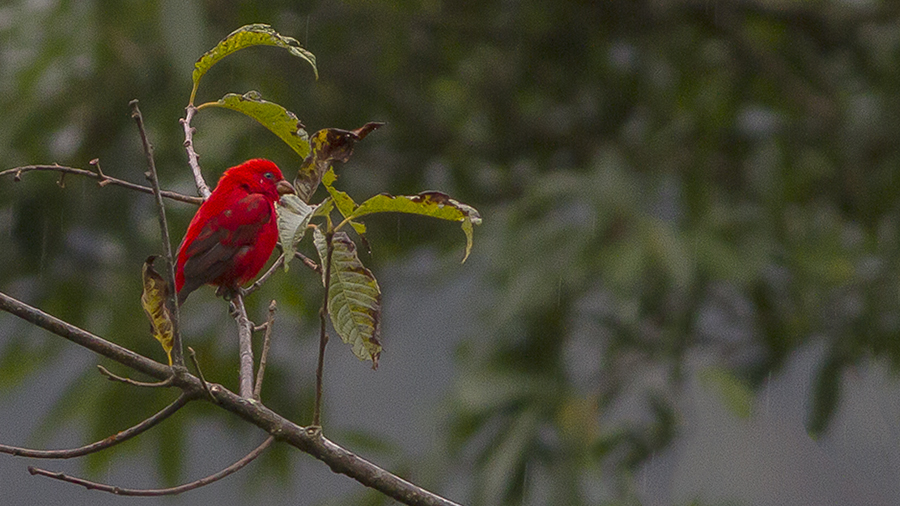
Male at Khangchendzonga National Park, Sikkim, India

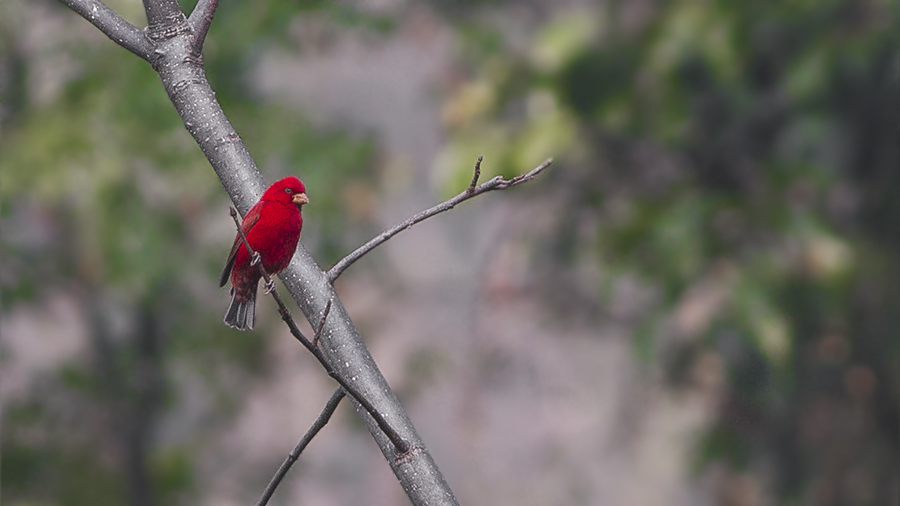
Male at Khangchendzonga National Park, Sikkim, India

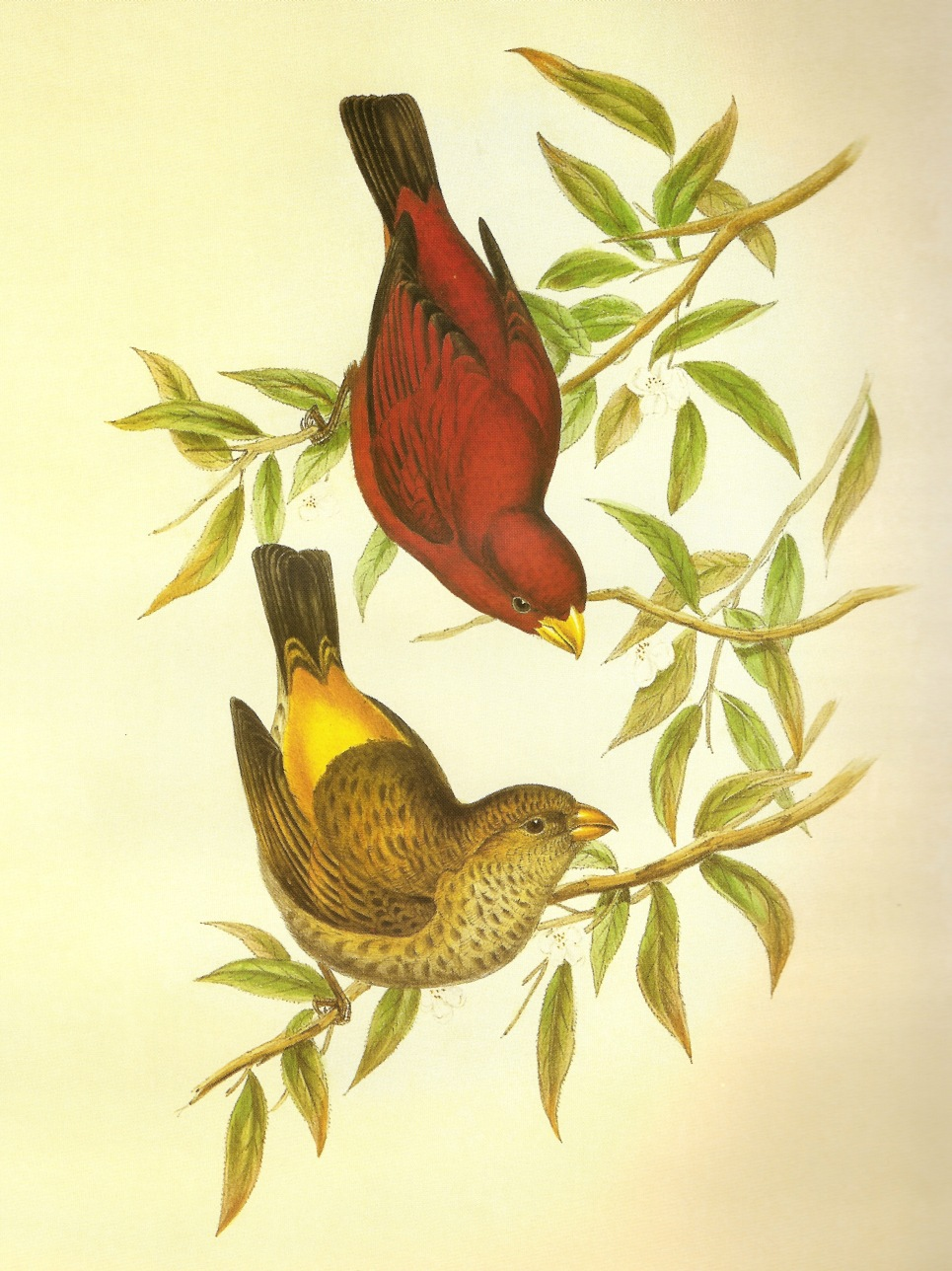
Illustration of a pair by John Gould
