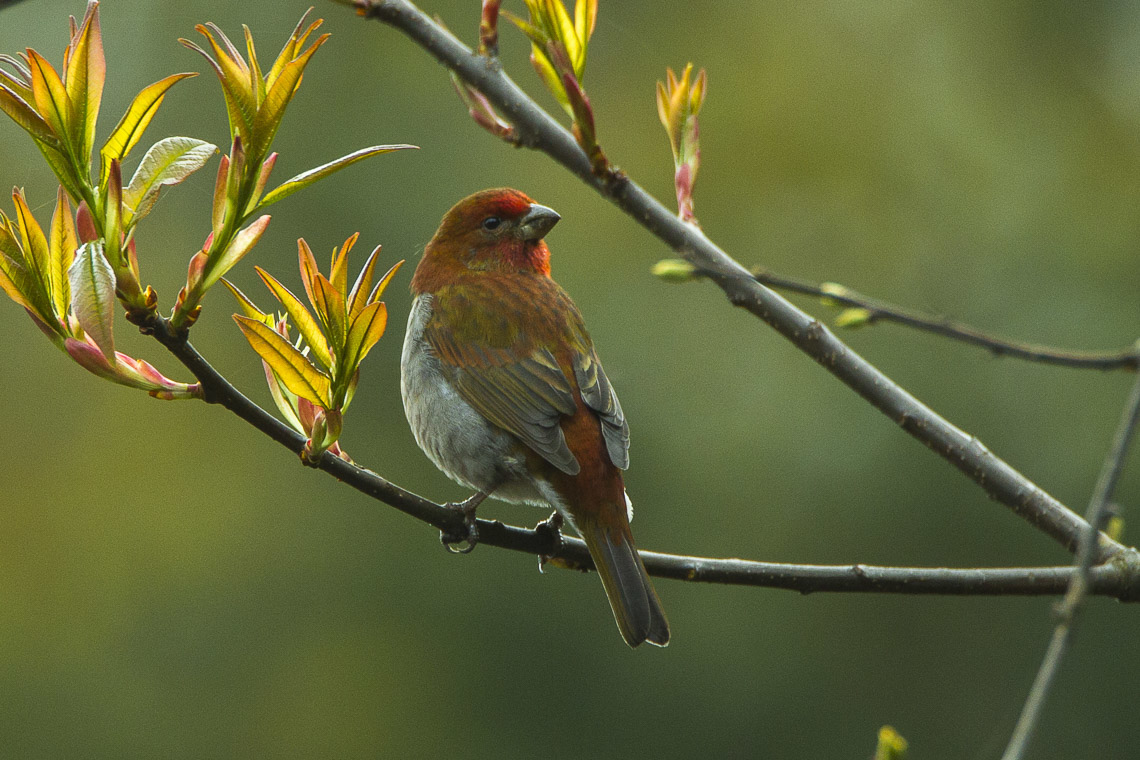

Conservation status
- Least Concern (IUCN 3.1)

Scientific classification
- Kingdom: Animalia
- Phylum: Chordata
- Class: Aves
- Order: Passeriformes
- Family: Fringillidae
- Subfamily: Carduelinae
- Genus: Carpodacus
- Species: C. subhimachalus

Binomial name
- Carpodacus subhimachalus (Hodgson, 1836)

Synonyms
- Pinicola subhimachalus Propyrrhula subhimachala

= Crimson-browed finch =

Species of bird

The crimson-browed finch (Carpodacus subhimachalus) is a true finch species (family Fringillidae). It is found in Bhutan, China, India, Myanmar, and Nepal. Its natural habitats are temperate forests and temperate shrubland.

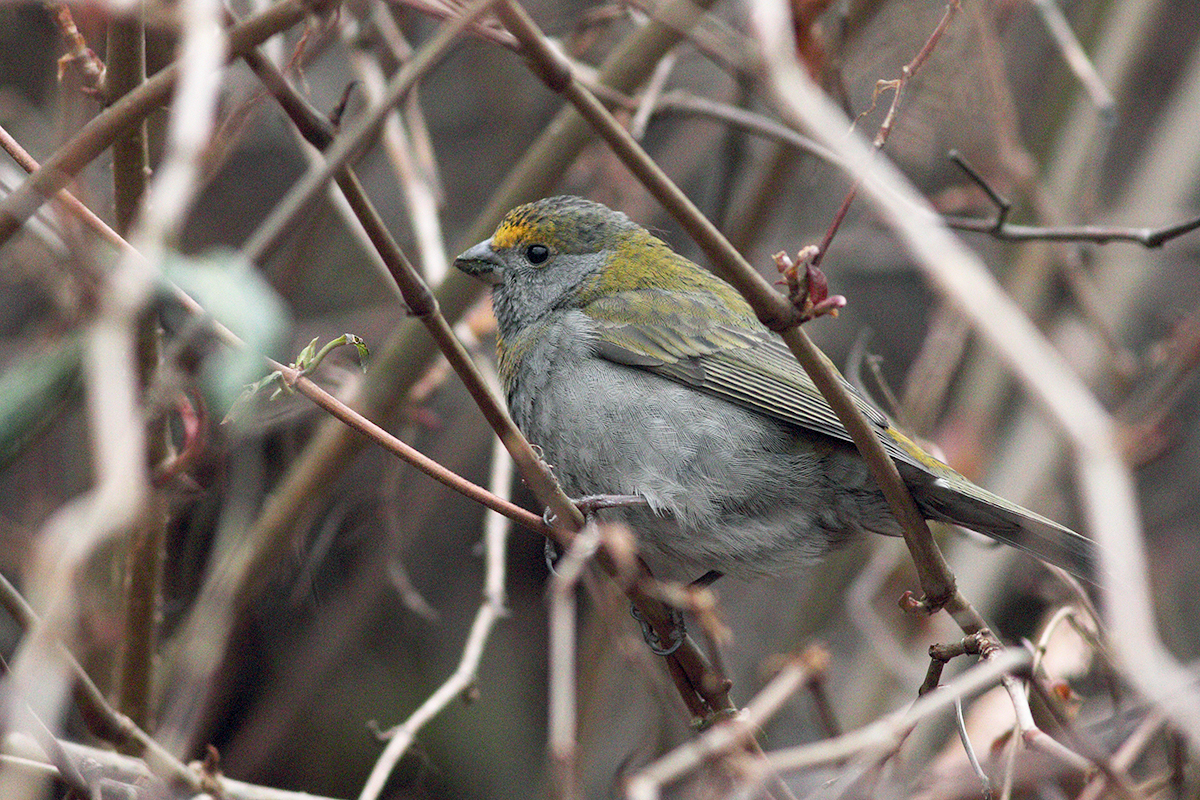
Female of the species from Eaglenest Wildlife Sanctuary, Arunachal Pradesh.

This is a large finch with a large short bill. The male has a crimson red head and throat. The female has a yellow head and throat.

The species was described by the British naturalist Brian Houghton Hodgson in 1836 under the binomial name Corythus subhimachalus. The species name subhimachalus combines the Latin sub meaning 'beneath' and the Hindi word himachal meaning snow. The crimson-browed finch was formerly placed in the genus Pinicola but was moved to the rosefinch genus Carpodacus based on the results from the phylogenetic analyses of mitochondrial and nuclear DNA sequences.
