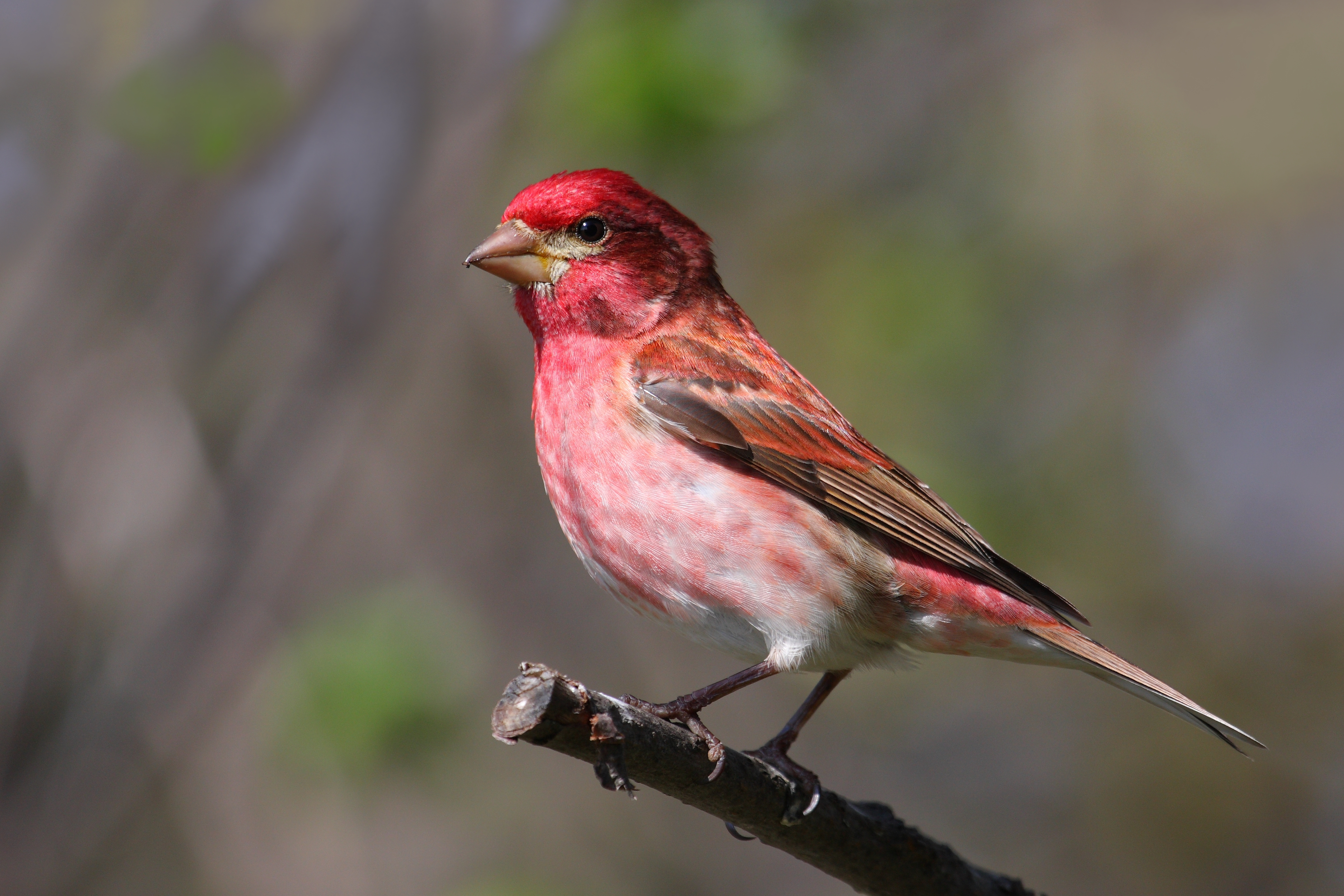
- Male
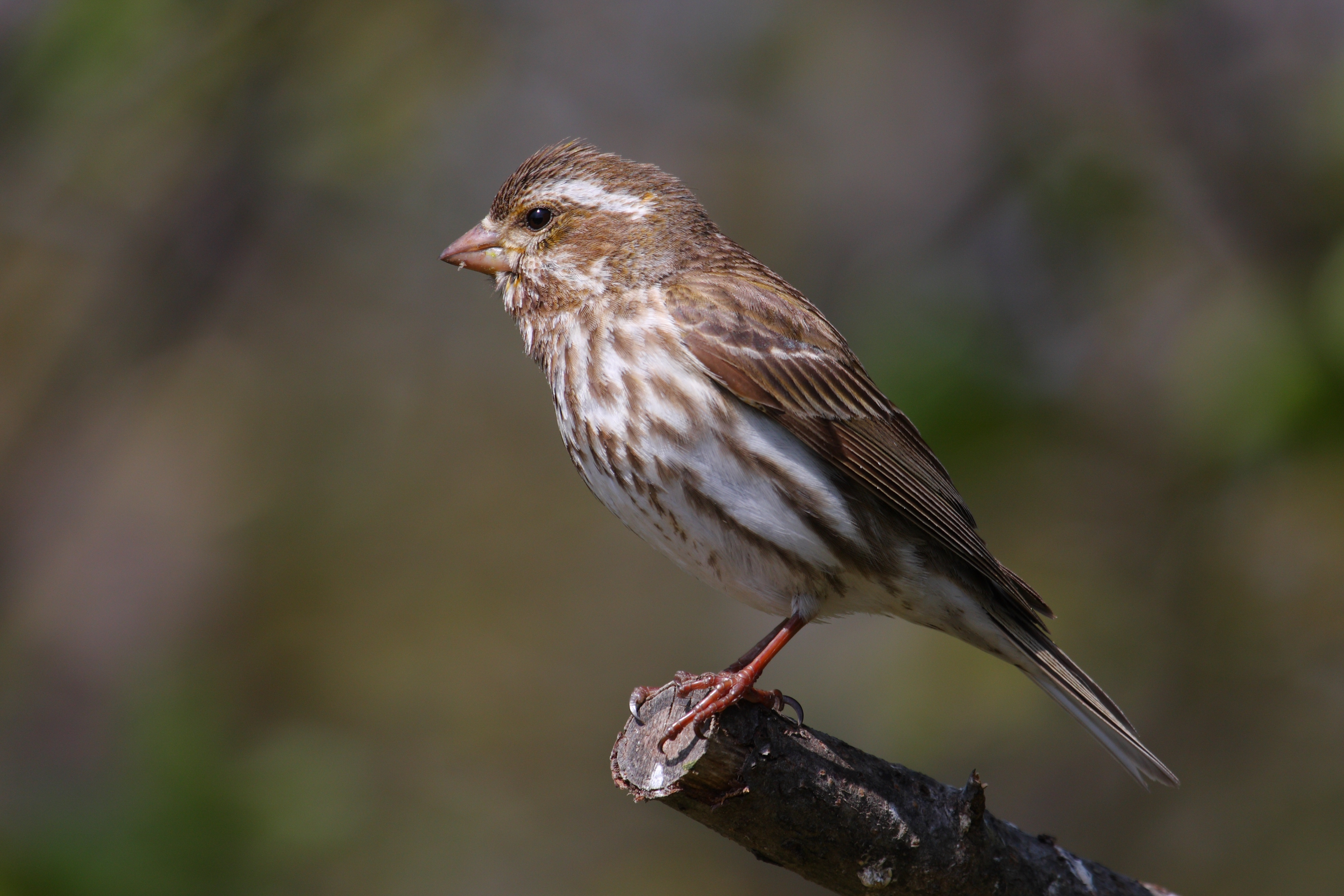
- Female

Conservation status
- Least Concern (IUCN 3.1)

Scientific classification
- Kingdom: Animalia
- Phylum: Chordata
- Class: Aves
- Order: Passeriformes
- Family: Fringillidae
- Subfamily: Carduelinae
- Genus: Haemorhous
- Species: H. purpureus

Binomial name
- Haemorhous purpureus (Gmelin, 1789)
- Range of C. purpureus Breeding range Year-round range Wintering range

Synonyms
- Burrica purpurea Carpodacus purpureus

= Purple finch =

Purple finch Temporal range: Late Pleistocene–present

Species of bird

The purple finch (Haemorhous purpureus) is a bird in the finch family, Fringillidae. It breeds in the northern United States, southern Canada, and the west coast of North America.

== Taxonomy ==
The purple finch was formally described in 1789 by the German naturalist Johann Friedrich Gmelin in his revised and expanded edition of Carl Linnaeus's Systema Naturae. He placed it with the finches in the genus Fringilla and coined the binomial name Fringilla purpurea. Gmelin specified the locality as Carolina. Gmelin based his account on the "purple finch" that had been described and illustrated by the English naturalist Mark Catesby in his book The Natural History of Carolina, Florida and the Bahama Islands. The purple finch is now one of three finches placed in the genus Haemorhous that was introduced in 1837 by the English naturalist William Swainson.

Two subspecies are recognised:

- H. p. purpureus (Gmelin, JF, 1789) – central south, southeast Canada and northeast USA
- H. p. californicus (Baird, SF, 1858) – southwest Canada and west USA

This species and the other "American rosefinches" were formerly included with the rosefinches of Eurasia in the genus Carpodacus; however, the three North American species are not closely related to the rosefinches of the Old World, and have thus been moved to the genus Haemorhous.

== Description ==
The purple finch is 12–16 cm (4.7–6.3 in) in overall length and weighs a mean 23.3 g (0.82 oz), ranging from 19.8 to 28.4 g (0.7 - 1.0 oz). It has a short forked brown tail and brown wings. Adult males are raspberry red on the head, breast, back and rump; their back is streaked. Adult females have light brown upperparts and white underparts with dark brown streaks throughout; they have a white line on the face above the eye.

The subspecies H. P. californicus differs from the nominate in having a longer tail and shorter wings. The plumage of both males and females is darker, and the coloration of the females is more greenish. It also has a longer bill.

== Distribution and habitat ==
Their breeding habitat is coniferous and mixed forest in Canada and the northeastern United States, as well as various wooded areas along the U.S. Pacific coast.

Birds from northern Canada migrate to the southern and midwestern United States; other birds are permanent residents.

The purple finch population has been displaced from some breeding season habitats in the Eastern United States following the introduction of the house finch, which is native to the western U.S. and Mexico. The two species share a similar niche, with the house finch often outcompeting the purple finch during the summer.

== Behavior ==
=== Song ===
Warbling of eastern purple finch

Purple finch males sing several types of musical vocalizations, including a continuous dense warbling that is characteristic of many types of finches, and a rapid string of high and low musical notes used when flocking, announcing territory, or attracting a mate. The continuous song has an up-and-down cadence of various notes. Nesting females have their own songs.

=== Food and feeding ===
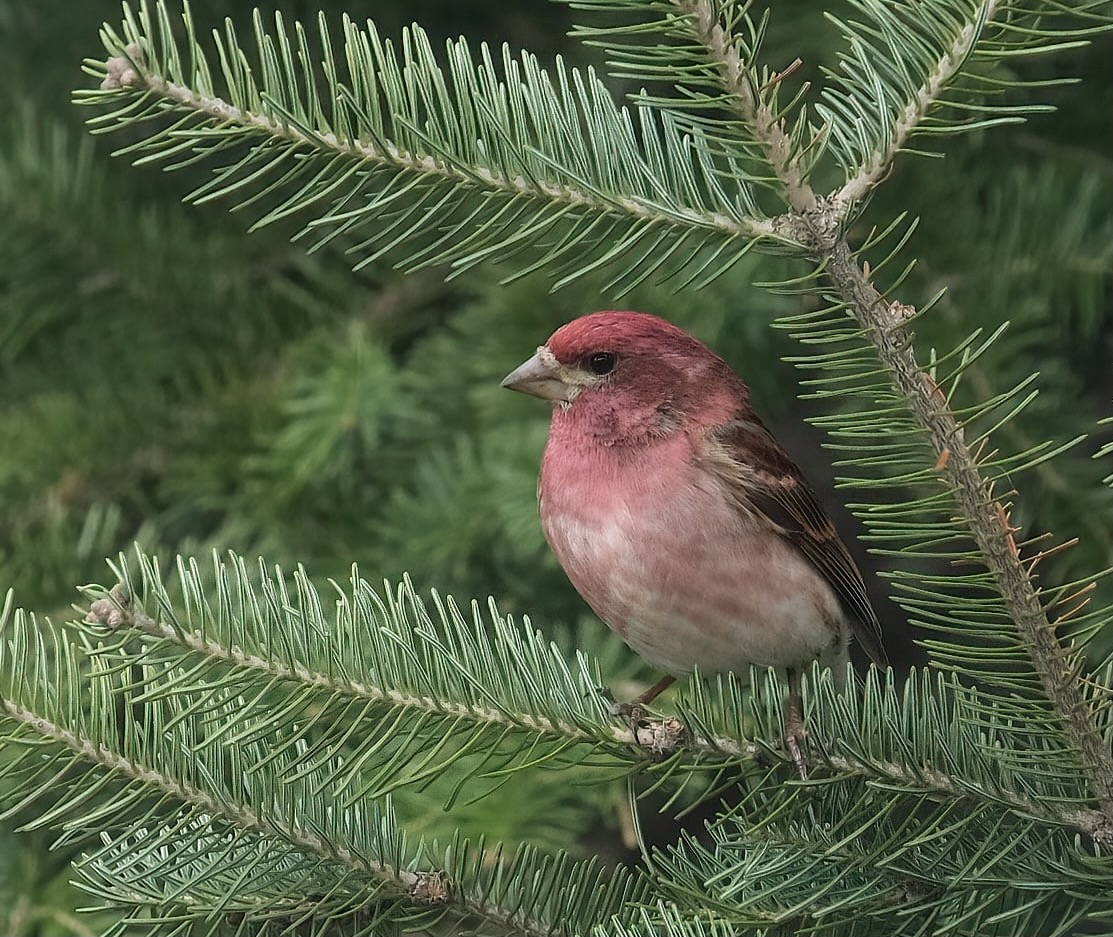
Male purple finch

These birds forage in trees and bushes, sometimes in ground vegetation. They mainly eat seeds, berries, and insects. They also eat tree buds, caterpillars, and beetles.

=== Breeding ===
The purple finch prefers nesting in lowland coniferous and mixed forests, avoiding more heavily populated urban areas, but sometimes is found in rural areas. The female usually builds a nest on horizontal branches of coniferous trees, away from the trunk, but occasionally in tree forks. The nest is shaped like an open cup, made up of rootlets, twigs, and weeds, and lined with grass, hair, and moss. Three to six eggs are common. Both females and males feed the nestlings, which leave the nest two to three weeks after hatching.

== Cultural depictions ==
In 1957 the purple finch was designated as the state bird of New Hampshire. The New Hampshire red hen (breed of domestic chicken) was also proposed, but was not chosen in favor of the purple finch. In 1763, Richard Brookes made the description of the female purple finch in Mexico with the name of "chiantototl" (chia seed bird).
