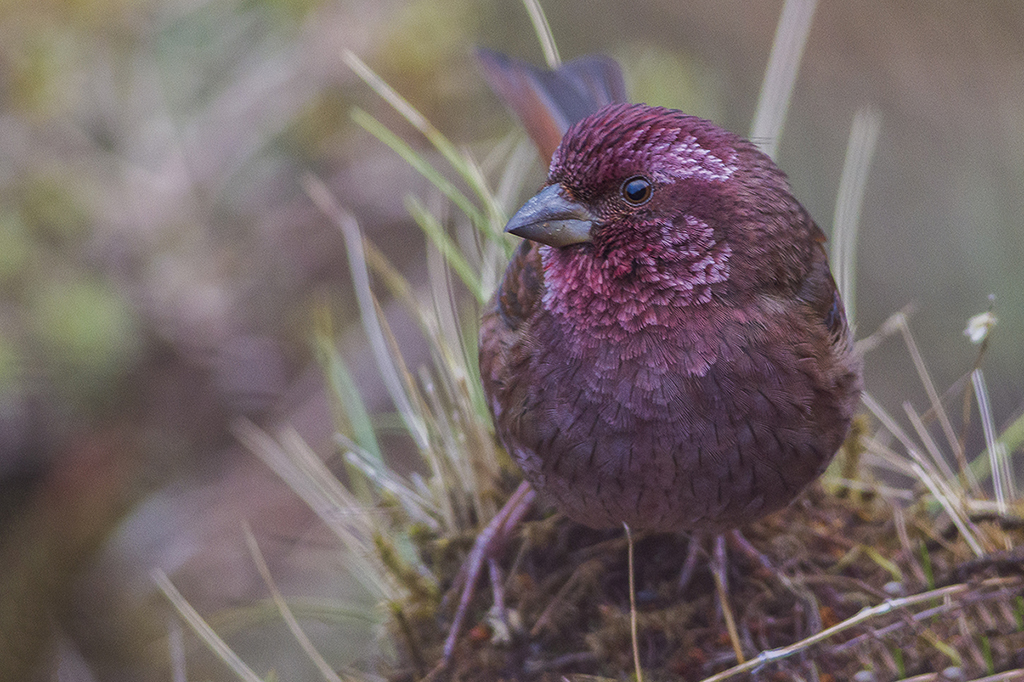
- From East Sikkim, India

Conservation status
- Least Concern (IUCN 3.1)

Scientific classification
- Kingdom: Animalia
- Phylum: Chordata
- Class: Aves
- Order: Passeriformes
- Family: Fringillidae
- Subfamily: Carduelinae
- Genus: Carpodacus
- Species: C. edwardsii

Binomial name
- Carpodacus edwardsii Verreaux, 1871

= Dark-rumped rosefinch =

Species of bird

The dark-rumped rosefinch (Carpodacus edwardsii) is a species of finch in the family Fringillidae.

It is found in Bhutan, China, India, Myanmar, and Nepal. Its natural habitats are boreal forests and subtropical or tropical high-altitude shrubland.
