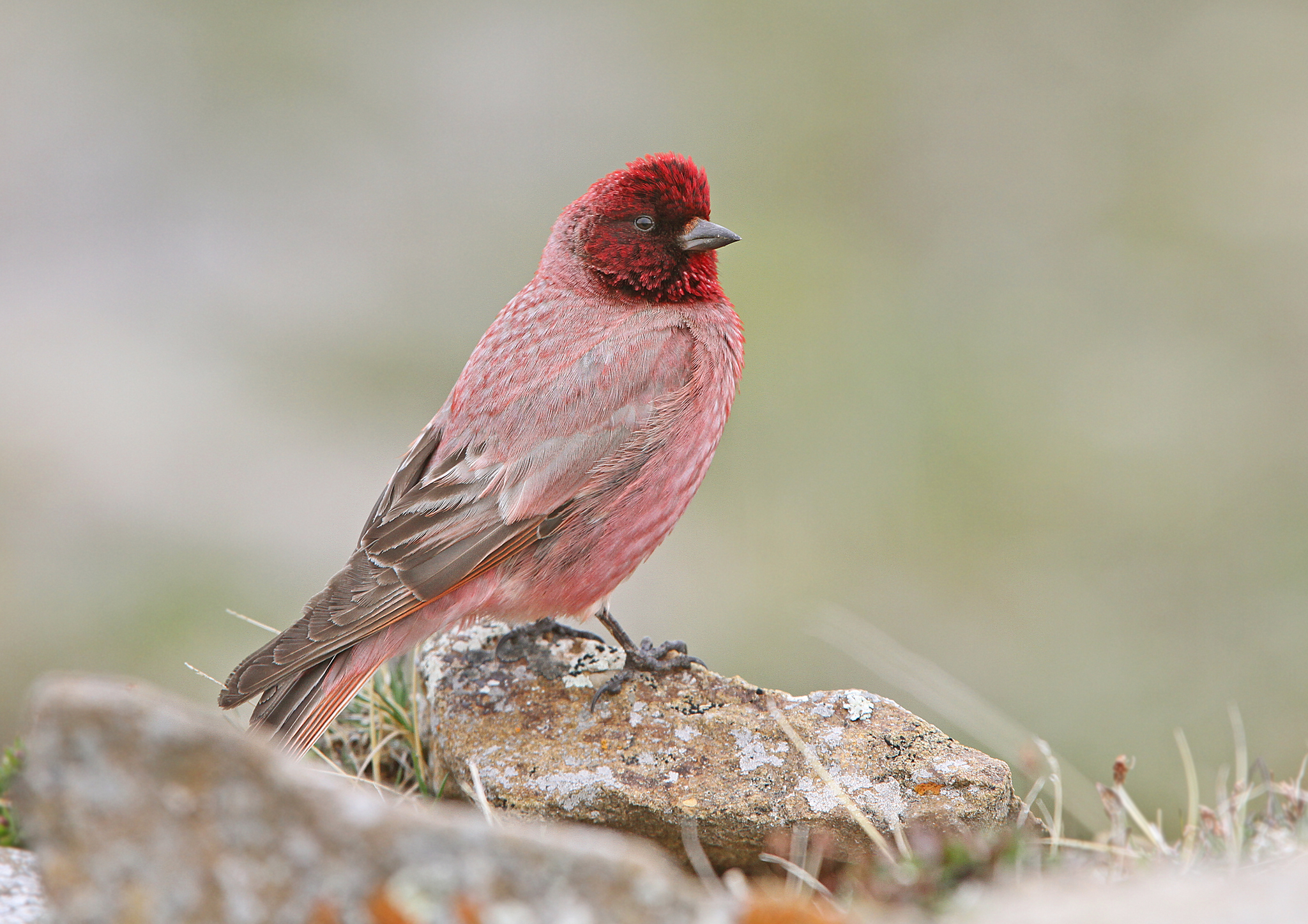

Conservation status
- Least Concern (IUCN 3.1)

Scientific classification
- Kingdom: Animalia
- Phylum: Chordata
- Class: Aves
- Order: Passeriformes
- Family: Fringillidae
- Subfamily: Carduelinae
- Genus: Carpodacus
- Species: C. roborowskii

Binomial name
- Carpodacus roborowskii (Przewalski, 1887)

= Tibetan rosefinch =

Species of bird

The Tibetan rosefinch (Carpodacus roborowskii), also known as Roborovski's rosefinch, is a species of rosefinch in the finch family Fringillidae. It is sometimes placed in the monotypic genus Kozlowia. It is endemic to the Tibetan Plateau. Its natural habitat is montane tundra.

== Distribution and habitat ==
The Tibetan rosefinch is found in northeastern Tibet, in the Buckhan Boda Shan, Amne Machin and Kunlun mountains in Qinghai. These birds live among rocky steppes and alpine pastures, in areas with sparse vegetation. Because of its desolate habitat, the Tibetan rosefinch's range is shared with few other birds, aside from Brandt's mountain finch.

== Behavior ==
Tibetan rosefinches are diurnal. They live mostly on the ground, traveling quickly hopping in search of food.

=== Diet ===
Tibetan rosefinches are ground feeders. They feed mainly on seeds, as well as fragments of flowers including the lousewort (Pedicularis).

=== Vocalization ===
The Tibetan rosefinch is mainly silent. Its call consists of brief whistling, along with louder trills, particularly in flight. It occasionally makes hissing sounds.
