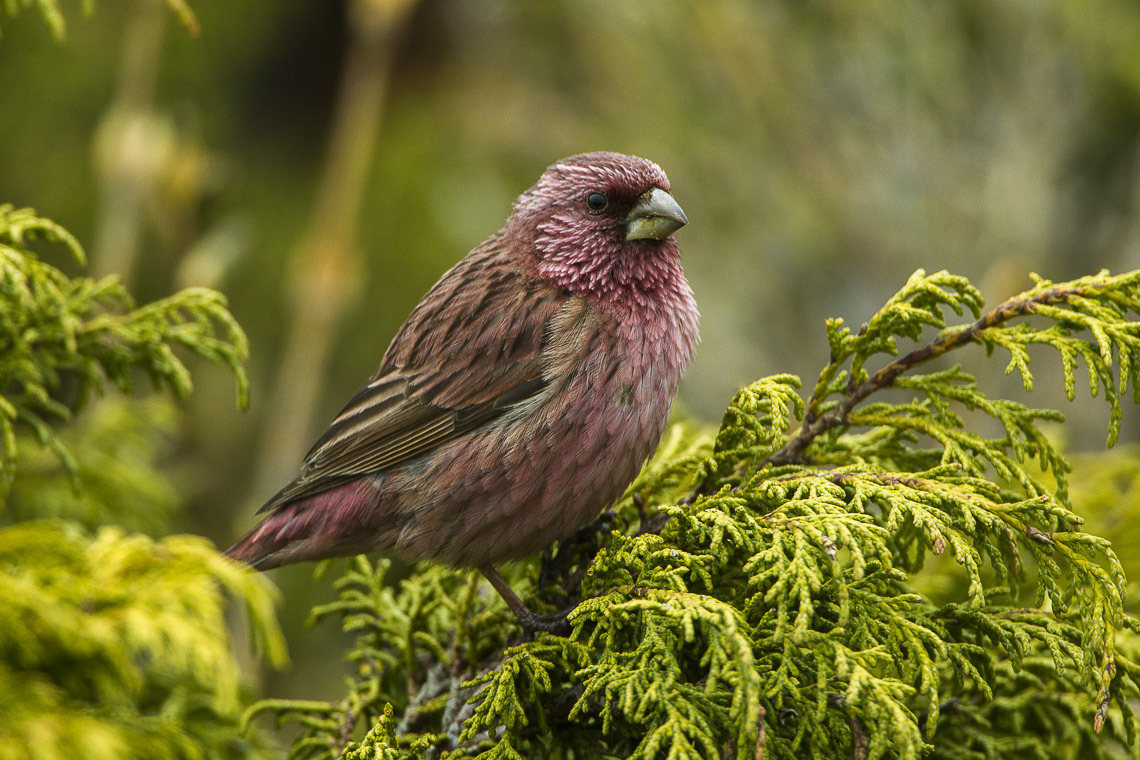

Conservation status
- Least Concern (IUCN 3.1)

Scientific classification
- Kingdom: Animalia
- Phylum: Chordata
- Class: Aves
- Order: Passeriformes
- Family: Fringillidae
- Subfamily: Carduelinae
- Genus: Carpodacus
- Species: C. rhodochlamys

Binomial name
- Carpodacus rhodochlamys (Brandt, 1843)

= Red-mantled rosefinch =

Species of bird

The red-mantled rosefinch (Carpodacus rhodochlamys) is a species of finch in the family Fringillidae. It is found in Afghanistan, China, India, Iran, Kyrgyzstan, Kazakhstan, Mongolia, Pakistan, Russia, and Tajikistan. Its natural habitats are temperate forest and boreal shrubland.
