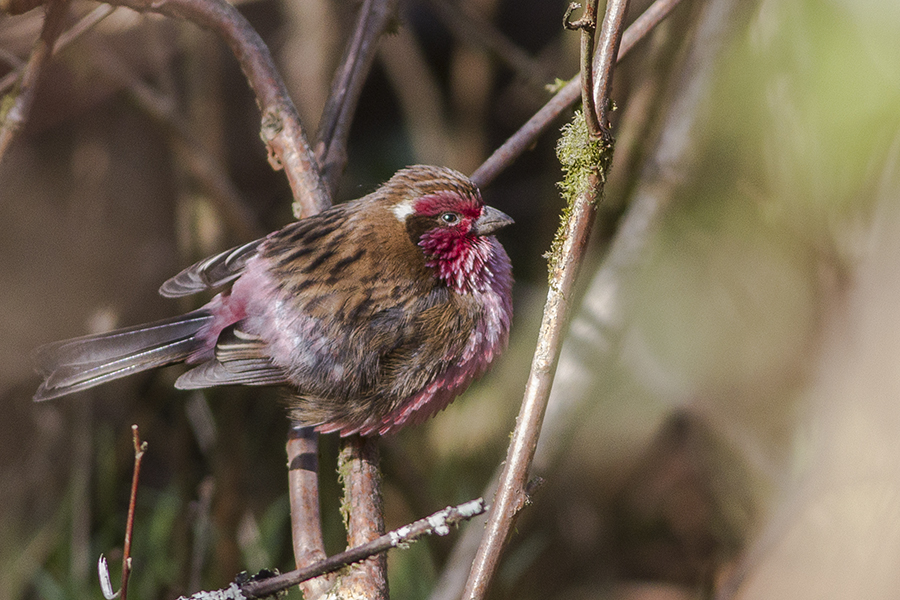
- Male (♂) of the species from Pangolakha Wildlife Sanctuary in Sikkim, India.
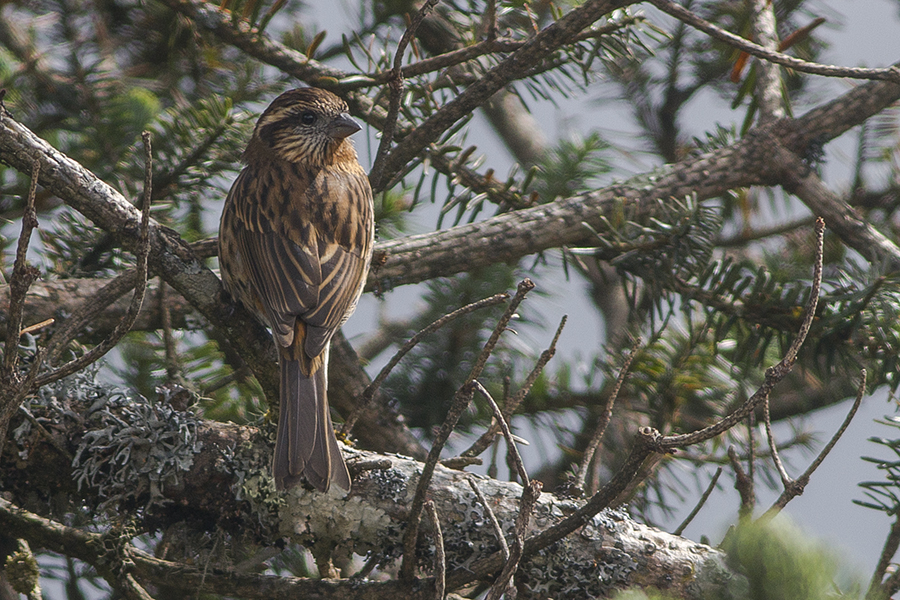
- Female (♀) of the species from Pangolakha Wildlife Sanctuary in Sikkim, India.

Conservation status
- Least Concern (IUCN 3.1)

Scientific classification
- Kingdom: Animalia
- Phylum: Chordata
- Class: Aves
- Order: Passeriformes
- Family: Fringillidae
- Subfamily: Carduelinae
- Genus: Carpodacus
- Species: C. thura

Binomial name
- Carpodacus thura Bonaparte & Schlegel, 1850

= Himalayan white-browed rosefinch =

Species of bird

The Himalayan white-browed rosefinch (Carpodacus thura) is a true finch species (family Fringillidae).

Rages across the Himalayas, being found from Afghanistan in the west, eastwards across India to Tibet, Bhutan and Nepal. Its natural habitats are temperate forests and temperate shrubland.

== Gallery ==
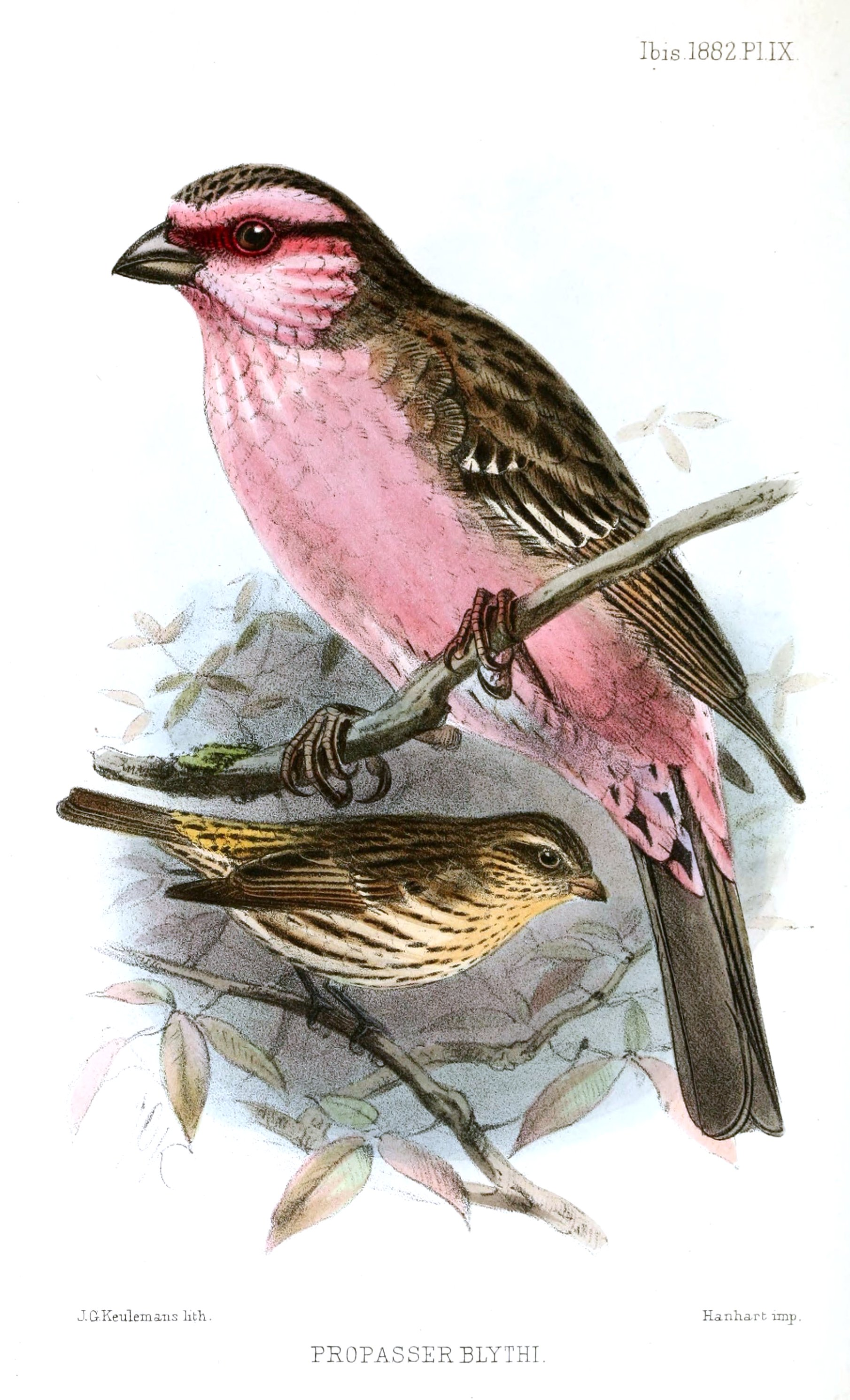
An artist's illustration.

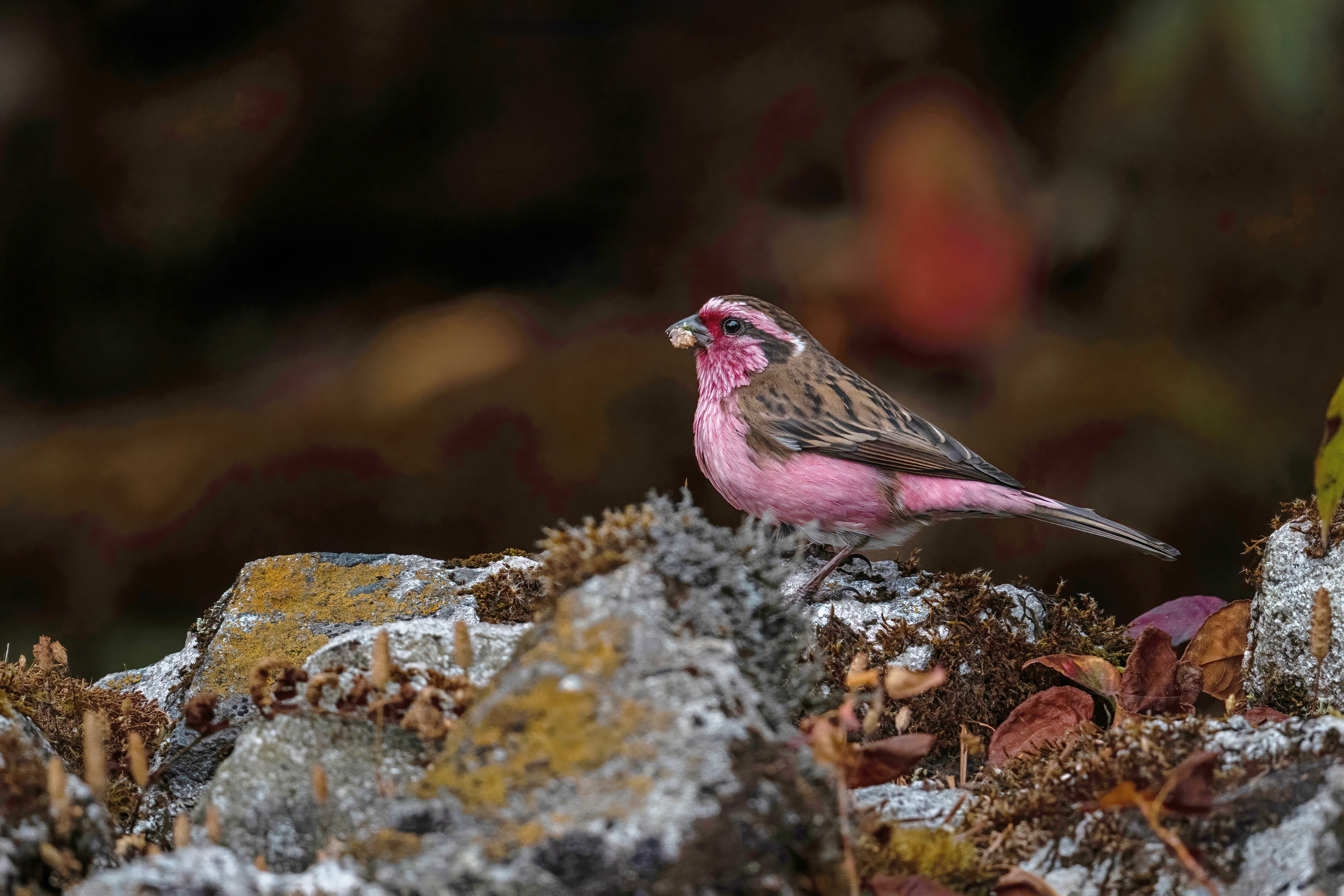
At Ama yangri route, Helambu, Nepal.

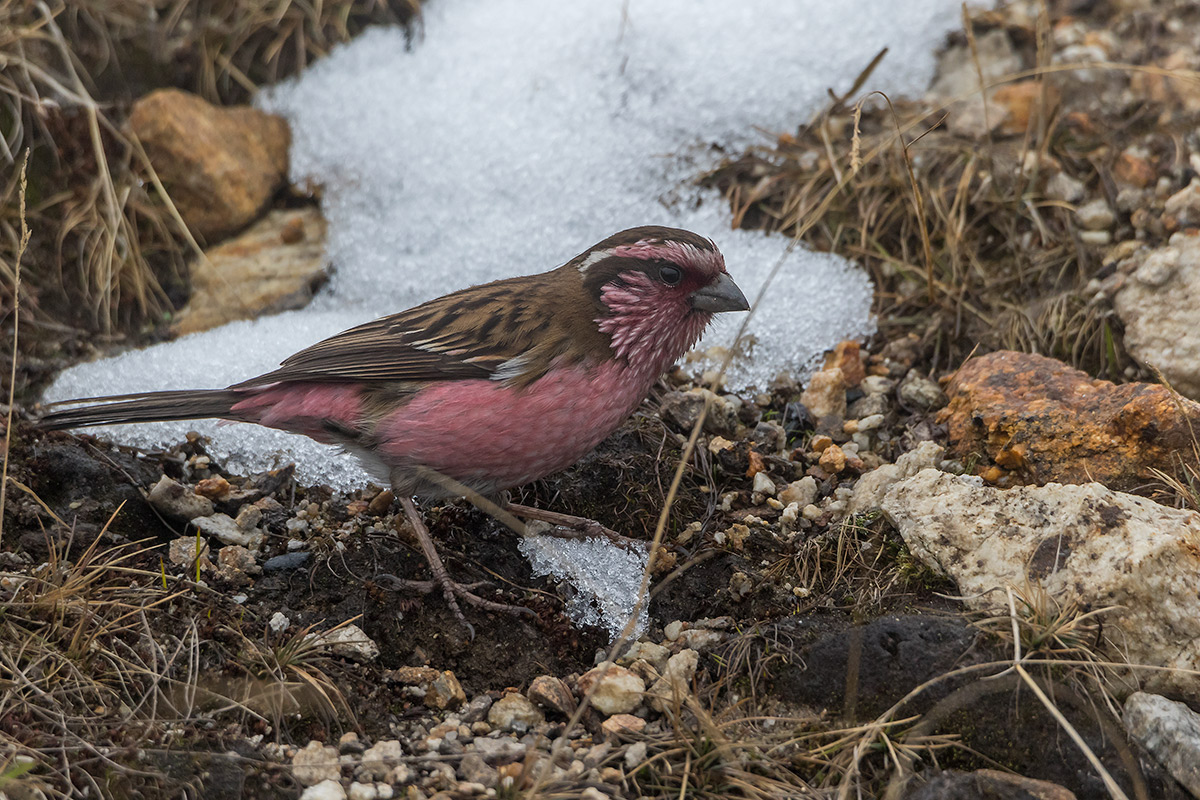
Male Bird at Gnathang in Sikkim.

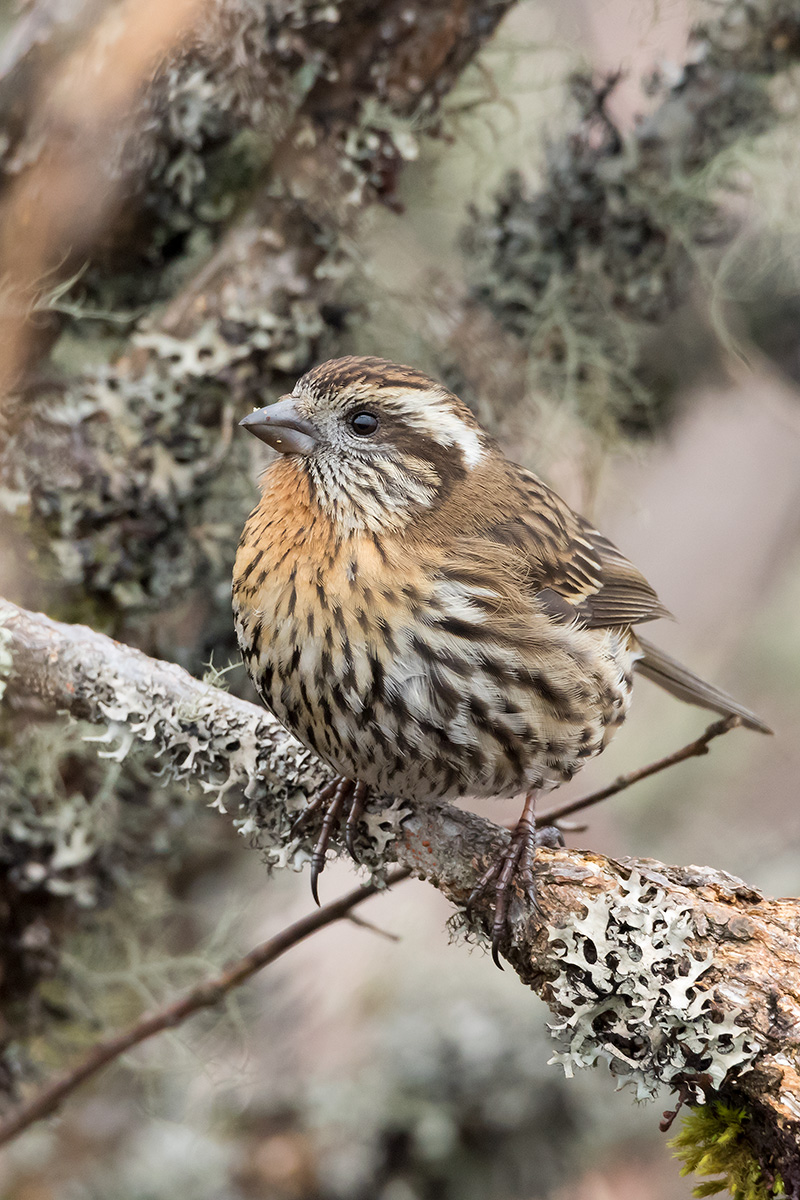
Female at Gnathang India.
