= Hawaiian honeycreeper conservation =

Hawaiian honeycreepers (Fringillidae), of the subfamily Carduelinae, were once quite abundant in all forests throughout Hawai'i. This group of birds historically consisted of at least 51 species. Less than half of Hawaii's previously extant species of honeycreeper still exist. Threats to species include habitat loss, avian malaria, predation by non-native mammals, and competition from non-native birds.

Conservation status of Hawaiian honeycreepers
Extinct species	Critically endangered species
Oahu 'akialoa (Akialoa ellisianus) (Wiped out by Western colonization); Maui Nui ʻakialoa (Akialoa lanaiensis) (Wiped out by Western colonization); Hawaiʻi ʻakialoa (Akialoa obscurus) (Wiped out by Western colonization); Kauaʻi ʻakialoa (Akialoa stejnegeri) (Wiped out by Western colonization); Hoopoe-billed ʻakialoa (Akialoa upupirostris) (Wiped out by Polynesian colonization); Kona grosbeak (Chloridops kona) (Wiped out by Western colonization); King Kong grosbeak (Chloridops regiskongi) (Wiped out by Polynesian colonization); Wahi grosbeak (Chloridops wahi) (Wiped out by Polynesian colonization); Oʻahu icterid-like gaper (Aidemedia chascax) (Wiped out by Polynesian colonization); Maui Nui icterid-like gaper (Aidemedia lutetiae) (Wiped out by Polynesian colonization); Sickle-billed gaper (Aidemedia zanclops) (Wiped out by Polynesian colonization); ʻUla-ʻai-hawane (Ciridops anna) (Wiped out by Western colonization); Stout-legged finch (Ciridops tenax) (Wiped out by Polynesian colonization); Lanai hookbill (Dysmorodrepanis munroi) (Wiped out by Western colonization); Hawaii mamo (Drepanis pacifica) (Wiped out by Western colonization); Black mamo (Drepanis funerea) (Wiped out by Western colonization); Oahu nukupu'u (Hemignathus lucidus) (Wiped out by Western colonization); Giant nukupu'u (Hemignathus vorpalis) (Wiped out by Polynesian colonization); Laysan honeycreeper (Himatione fraithii) (Wiped out by Western colonization); Kauaʻi palila (Loxioides kikuichi) (Wiped out by Polynesian colonization); Oʻahu ʻakepa (Loxops wolstenholmei) (Wiped out by Western colonization); Highland finch (Orthiospiza howarthi) (Wiped out by Polynesian colonization); Kakawahie (Paroreomyza flammea) (Wiped out by Western colonization); Lana'i 'alauahio (Paroreomyza montana montana) (Wiped out by Western colonization); Lesser koa-finch (Rhodacanthis flaviceps) (Wiped out by Western colonization); Scissor-billed koa-finch (Rhodacanthis forfex) (Wiped out by Polynesian colonization); Primitive koa-finch (Rhodacanthis litotes) (Wiped out by Polynesian colonization); Greater koa-finch (Rhodacanthis palmeri); Kauaʻi finch (Telespiza persecutrix) (Wiped out by Polynesian colonization); Maui Nui finch (Telespiza ypsilon) (Wiped out by Polynesian colonization); Strange-billed finch (Vangulifer mirandus) (Wiped out by Polynesian colonization); Thin-billed finch (Vangulifer neophasis) (Wiped out by Polynesian colonization); Greater amakihi (Viridonia sagittirostris); Cone-billed finch (Xestospiza conica) (Wiped out by Polynesian colonization); Ridge-billed finch (Xestospiza fastigialis) (Wiped out by Polynesian colonization); ʻŌʻū (Psittirostra psittacea) (Wiped out by Western colonization); Maui ʻakepa (Loxops ochraceus) (Wiped out by Western colonization); Poʻo-uli (Melamprosops phaeosoma) (Wiped out by Western colonization); Maui nukupu'u (Hemignathus affinis) (Wiped out by Western colonization); Kauai nukupu'u (Hemignathus hanapepe) (Wiped out by Western colonization)	Palila (Loxioides bailleui); ‘Akeke‘e (Loxops caeruleirostris); ʻAkikiki (Oreomystis bairdi); ʻAkohekohe (Palmeria dolei); Oʻahu ʻalauahio (Paroreomyza maculata), probably extinct; Maui parrotbill (Pseudonestor xanthophrys); Nihoa finch (Telespiza ultima)
Endangered species	Vulnerable species
ʻAkiapolaʻau (Hemignathus wilsoni); Hawai'i 'akepa (Loxops coccineus); ʻAlawī (Loxops mana); Maui Nui ʻalauahio (Paroreomyza montana newtoni)	Oʻahu ʻamakihi (Chlorodrepanis flavus); Kauaʻi ʻamakihi (Chlorodrepanis kauaiensis); ʻAnianiau (Magumma parva); Laysan finch (Telespiza cantans); ʻIʻiwi (Vestiaria coccinea)
Near-threatened species	Species of least concern
	Common ʻamakihi (Chlorodrepanis virens); ʻApapane (Himatione sanguinea)

== Hawaiian honeycreeper threats ==
The honeycreepers are threatened by recently introduced predation, competition, parasitism, degradation of habitat, and infectious disease including mosquito-borne avian malaria. One of the consequences of the invasive birds is the introduction of avian malaria. The pathogen is primarily transmitted via female mosquitoes who will pass on the disease by biting a susceptible individual after having bitten an infected individual. The main mosquito vector (Culex quinquefasciatus) was introduced over a hundred years before the pathogen (Plasmodium r. capistranoae), mostly hosted by the blue-breasted quail (Excalfactoria chinensis). Later, two other mosquito species, the Asian tiger mosquito (Aedes albopictus) and the bromeliad mosquito (Wyeomyia mitchellii) were introduced to the islands. The immune system of the honeycreepers had not been exposed to avian malaria since its common ancestor existed 4 to 5 million years ago. Thus, the honeycreepers had not co-evolved with the pathogen to develop resistance as those birds on the mainland did.

In the 1970s, the Hawai’i Forest Bird Survey found that native birds had retreated from mid or low elevation forest and had been replaced by exotic species; however, competition was not documented between them and the native species. During the same time, the elevational limit of malaria was established to be approximately 1,500 metres (4,900 ft) Above this elevation the mosquito vector could not subsist due to the low temperatures. Due to malaria, highly susceptible species must reside at 1,500 to 1,900 metres (4,900 to 6,200 ft). Global warming may move that line higher until these species no longer have a refuge.

Degradation of habitat for the Hawaiian honeycreepers has also been a main cause for the radical decrease in their population numbers. Colonization of the Hawaiian islands has led to extensive deforestation to make way for agriculture, ranching, and other development. Furthermore, where the forests are still intact, introduced domestic pigs and goats have done considerable damage to habitat. Other destructive invasive species include cats, who feed on birds, especially those who are naive to predators (such as Hawaiian honeycreepers).

Efforts to conserve the remaining species are of great interest and a couple of different methods have been described.

=== Remove mosquito vector ===
There are a few strategies for mosquito removal which include the reduction of mosquito breeding sites by: chemical and biological control agents, genetic manipulation of the population, and removal of feral ungulates from critical forest habitats. The goal is to eliminate the mosquito populations using herd immunity, which does not require the unfeasible eradication of every individual mosquito. Another strategy requires releasing genetically manipulated sterile mosquito males into the wild every generation and as a consequence the mosquito populations diminish over time.

=== Captive breeding ===
In many cases habitat protection is not occurring fast enough for critically endangered Hawaiian honeycreeper species to keep their populations afloat. The Zoological Society of San Diego and Peregrine Fund have established management programs aimed at breeding these species in captivity and releasing them back into the wild. As reported in 2000, the major challenge for the program did not include successfully breeding the birds in captivity but finding suitable habitat to release them. Thus, habitat management and restoration must be rigorously ensured before this breeding program can be secured.

=== Clearing habitat of invasive species ===
The Hawaiian honeycreepers are generally specialists both in diet and in habitat. This has left them very vulnerable directly and indirectly to the generalist invaders that have been introduced to the islands. Other birds have provided direct competition for resources with the honeycreepers as well as brought disease (such as avian malaria). However removing the introduced birds is difficult due to their inaccessibility to humans and high dispersal ability. Introduced ungulates include pigs and goats. Removal of large vertebrates requires both fencing and direct removal of the animals. In places where pigs have been removed, vegetation has begun to recover. However, Hawaiian honeycreeper numbers are still in decline and this may be due to introduced predators: feral cats, small Asian mongooses, and three species of rat.

== Hope: the ʻamakihi ==
The common ʻamakihi (Hemignathus virens) is one of seven extant honeycreeper species on Hawai’i Island. It is a small generalist that has historically shown high mortality rates due to infection by avian malaria. Surprisingly, they have been found at altitudes below 400 metres (1,300 ft) despite their exposure to the pathogen. 90% of these birds showed they had contracted and survived the disease. This finding has raised the possibility that the species may be evolving resistance to malaria, however this may be only a localized event.

== See also ==
- Conservation biology
