= List of endemic birds of Hawaii =

There are 71 known taxa of birds endemic to the Hawaiian Islands, of which 30 are extinct, 6 possibly extinct and 30 of the remaining 48 species and subspecies are listed as endangered or threatened by the United States Fish and Wildlife Service. In the era following Western contact, habitat loss and avian disease are thought to have had the greatest effect on endemic bird species in Hawaii, although native peoples are implicated in the loss of dozens of species before the arrival of Captain Cook and others, in large part due to the arrival of the Polynesian rat (Rattus exulans) which came along with the first Polynesians.

== List of species ==
The following is a list of bird species and subspecies endemic to the Hawaiian Islands:

=== Procellariidae ===
- Hawaiian petrel or ʻuaʻu, Pterodroma sandwichensis VU
- Newell's shearwater or ʻaʻo, Puffinus newelli CR
- Bryan's shearwater, Puffinus bryani CR (P. assimilis: LC)
- Bonin petrel, Pterodroma hypoleuca LC 99% of the total population breeds on the Northwestern Hawaiian Islands

=== Anatidae ===
- Hawaiian goose or nēnē, Branta sandvicensis VU
- Hawaiian duck or koloa maoli, Anas wyvilliana EN
- Laysan duck, Anas laysanensis CR

=== Diomedeidae ===
- Laysan albatross, Phoebastria immutabilis NT 99.7% of the total population breeds on the Northwestern Hawaiian Islands
- Black-footed albatross, Phoebastria nigripes NT 97.5% of the total population breeds on the Northwestern Hawaiian Islands

=== Accipitridae ===
- Hawaiian hawk or ʻio, Buteo solitarius NT

=== Rallidae ===
- Laysan rail, Porzana palmeri † EX
- Hawaiian rail or moho, Porzana sandwichensis † EX
- Hawaiian gallinule or ʻalae ʻula, Gallinula chloropus sandwichensis (G. chloropus: LC)
- Hawaiian coot or ʻalae keʻokeʻo, Fulica alai VU

=== Recurvirostridae ===
- Hawaiian stilt or aeʻo, Himantopus mexicanus knudseni (NR) (H. mexicanus: LC)

=== Laridae ===
- Hawaiian black noddy or noio, Anous minutus melanogenys (A. minutus: LC)

=== Strigidae ===
- Pueo, Asio flammeus sandwichensis (NR) (A. flammeus: LC)

=== Mohoidae ===
- Kauaʻi ʻōʻō, Moho braccatus † EX
- Oʻahu ʻōʻō, Moho apicalis † EX
- Bishop's ʻōʻō, Moho bishopi † EX
- Hawaiʻi ʻōʻō, Moho nobilis † EX
- Kioea, Chaetoptila angustipluma † EX

=== Corvidae ===
- Hawaiian crow or ʻalala, Corvus hawaiiensis EW

=== Monarchidae ===
- Kauaʻi ʻelepaio, Chasiempis sclateri VU
- Oʻahu ʻelepaio, Chasiempis ibidis EN
- Hawaiʻi ʻelepaio, Chasiempis sandwichensis VU

=== Sylviidae ===
- Laysan millerbird, Acrocephalus familaris familaris † EX
- Nihoa millerbird, Acrocephalus familaris kingi CR

=== Turdidae ===
- Kamaʻo, Myadestes myadestinus † EX
- Puaiohi, Myadestes palmeri CR
- Olomaʻo, Myadestes lanaiensis CR (PE)
  - ʻĀmaui, Myadestes (lanaiensis) woahensis † EX
- ʻOmaʻo, Myadestes obscurus VU

=== Fringillidae ===
- Laysan finch, Telespiza cantans VU
- Nihoa finch, Telespiza ultima CR
- ʻŌʻū, Psittirostra psittacea EX
- Lanaʻi hookbill, Dysmorodrepanis munroi † EX
- Palila, Loxioides bailleui CR
- Kauaʻi palila, Loxioides kikuichi † EX
- Lesser koa-finch, Rhodacanthis flaviceps † EX
- Greater koa-finch, Rhodacanthis palmeri † EX
- Kona grosbeak, Chloridops kona † EX
- Maui parrotbill, Pseudonestor xanthophrys CR
- Kauaʻi ʻakialoa Akialoa stejnegeri or Hemignathus (ellisianus) procerus † EX
- Oʻahu ʻakialoa, Akialoa ellisiana or Hemignathus ellisianus ellisianus † EX
- Maui Nui ʻakialoa, Akialoa lanaiensis or Hemignathus (ellisianus) lanaiensis † EX
- Lesser ʻakialoa, Akialoa obscura or Hemignathus obscurus † EX
- Common ʻamakihi, Hemignathus virens LC
- Oʻahu ʻamakihi, Hemignathus flavus VU
- Kauaʻi ʻamakihi, Hemignathus kauaiensis VU
- Greater ʻamakihi, Hemignathus sagittirostris † EX
- Maui nukupuʻu, Hemignathus affinis EX
- Kauai nukupuʻu, Hemignathus hanapepe EX
- Oʻahu nukupuʻu, Hemignathus lucidus † EX
- ʻAkiapolaʻau, Hemignathus munroi EN
- ʻAnianiau, Magumma parva VU
- ʻAkikiki, Oreomystis bairdi CR
- Hawaiʻi creeper, Oreomystis mana EN
- Oʻahu ʻalauahio, Paroreomyza maculata CR (PE)
- Maui ʻalauahio, Paroreomyza montana EN
- Lanaʻi ʻalauahio, Paroreomyza montana montana † EX
- Kakawahie, Paroreomyza flammea † EX
- ʻAkekeʻe, Loxops caeruleirostris CR
- Hawaiʻi ʻakepa, Loxops coccineus EN
- Maui ʻākepa, Loxops coccineus ochraceus † EX
- Oʻahu ʻākepa, Loxops coccineus wolstenholmei † EX
- ʻUla-ʻai-hawane, Ciridops anna † EX
- ʻIʻiwi, Vestiaria coccinea VU
- Hawaiʻi mamo, Drepanis pacifica † EX
- Black mamo, Drepanis funerea † EX
- ʻAkohekohe, Palmeria dolei CR
- ʻApapane, Himatione sanguinea LC
- Laysan honeycreeper, Himatione fraithii † EX
- Poʻouli, Melamprosops phaeosoma † EX

== See also ==
- List of birds of Hawaii
- List of bird species introduced to the Hawaiian Islands
- Endemism in the Hawaiian Islands
- List of extinct animals of the Hawaiian Islands
