= List of adaptive radiated Hawaiian honeycreepers by form =

This is a List of adaptive radiated Hawaiian honeycreepers by form; these are the Hawaiian honeycreepers, especially the extinct forms, lost through late-European colonization. (These are adaptive radiative equivalents.)

== Finch-like ==
? species

Finch-like honeycreepers of Hawaii
| Taxa | Presence | Notes | Images |
|---|---|---|---|
| Honeycreeper: (finch-like): Psittirostra Chloridops}; 1. P. kona (Kona grosbeak) | | | P. kona |

== Hummingbird-like ==
? species

Hummingbird-like honeycreepers of Hawaii
| Taxa | Presence | Notes | Images |
|---|---|---|---|
| Honeycreeper: (hummingbird-like): ((sub)Genus: Akialoa) (part of Genus: Hemignathus–(1 Genus, 3 (sub)Genera)) Akialoa–(Hemignathus); 1. H. obscurus (Hawai'i 'akialoa) | | | Hawai'i 'akialoa—(H. obscurus) |

== Parrot-like ==
? species

Parrot-like honeycreepers of Hawaii
| Taxa | Presence | Notes | Images |
|---|---|---|---|
| Honeycreeper: (parrot-like): Psittirostra; 1. P. psittacea | | | P. psittaceae |

== Unique: longhorn beetle larva hunter-(parrot-like bill) ==
1 species-?

"Longhorn beetle harvester" honeycreepers of Hawaii
| Taxa | Presence | Notes | Images |
|---|---|---|---|
| Honeycreeper: ("Longhorn beetle harvester"): Pseudonestor; 1. P. xanthophrys (Maui parrotbill) | | | P. xanthophrys—(Maui parrotbill) |

== Warbler-like ==
? species

Warbler-like honeycreepers of Hawaii
| Taxa | Presence | Notes | Images |
|---|---|---|---|
| Honeycreeper: (warbler-like): Hemignathus; 1. H. virens (Common amakihi) (?-Loxops virens) | Extirpated from Lanai | | Common amakihi |

== Woodpecker-like ==
? species

Woodpecker-like honeycreepers of Hawaii
| Taxa | Presence | Notes | Images |
|---|---|---|---|
| Honeycreeper: (woodpecker-like): Genus:Hemignathus (Sub)Genus: Heterorhynchus; 1. H. wilsoni (ʻAkiapolaʻau) (H. munroi) | | | ʻAkiapolaʻau—(H. wilsoni) |

== Surviving forms: non-Prehistoric, not extinct ==
=== Finch-like ===
? species

Finch-like honeycreepers of Hawaii—(surviving species)
| Taxa | Presence | Notes | Images |
|---|---|---|---|
| honeycreeper: (finch-like); Tribe: Drepanidini: (a Thin-billed nectarivore:) Genus:Himatione; 1. ʻApapane) (H. sanguinea) | | | ʻApapane |

=== (Finch-like) (secondary: hummingbird-like)--(Hawaiian lobelioid-specialist) ===
1 species
True hummingbird-like species are all extinct.

(FINCH-like)–(secondary)–hummingbird-like–(Hawaiian lobelioid-specialist)–honeycreepers of Hawaii—(surviving species)
| Taxa | Presence | Notes | Images |
|---|---|---|---|
| Honeycreeper: (hummingbird-like) (secondary) (FINCH-like tribe): Genus:Vestiaria; 1. V. coccinea (ʻIʻiwi) | | | ʻIʻiwi) |

=== Parrot-like ===
4 species

Parrot-like honeycreepers of Hawaii—(surviving species)
| Taxa | Presence | Notes | Images |
|---|---|---|---|
| Genus: Pseudonestor; 1. P. xanthophrys–Maui parrotbill | | | Laysan finch Maui parrotbill Nihoa finch |
| Genus: Telespiza; 1. T. cantans–Laysan finch 2. T. ultima–Nihoa finch 3. T. ypsilon–Maui Nui finch | | | Laysan finch Maui parrotbill Nihoa finch |

=== Warbler-like ===
? species
(the only warbler-like?, (the other amakihi 's radiated-?))

Warbler-like honeycreepers of Hawaii—(surviving species)
| Taxa | Presence | Notes | Images |
|---|---|---|---|
| Honeycreeper: (warbler-like): Hemignathus; 1. H. virens (Common amakihi) (?-Loxops virens) | Extirpated from Lanai | | common amakihi |

=== Woodpecker-like ===
1 species

Woodpecker-like honeycreepers of Hawaii—(surviving species)
| Taxa | Presence | Notes | Images |
|---|---|---|---|
| honeycreeper: (woodpecker-like): Genus:Hemignathus (Sub)Genus: Heterorhynchus; 1. H. wilsoni (ʻAkiapolaʻau) (H. munroi) | | | ʻAkiapolaʻau—(H. wilsoni) |

== Alphabetical listing ==
- ʻAkiapolaʻau
- ʻApapane
- common amakihi
- Kona grosbeak
- Hawai'i 'akialoa
- ʻIʻiwi
- Laysan finch
- Maui Nui finch–(no photo)
- Maui parrotbill
- Nihoa finch
- ʻŌʻū

== Surviving forms in list ==
- ʻAkiapolaʻau
- ʻApapane
- common amakihi
- ʻIʻiwi
- Laysan finch
- Maui parrotbill
- Nihoa finch

== See also ==
- Hawaiian honeycreepers
- Adaptive radiation
- Honeycreepers
