= List of threatened birds of the United States =

According to the International Union for Conservation of Nature (IUCN), 77 bird species in the United States are threatened with extinction. The IUCN has classified each of these species into one of three conservation statuses: vulnerable VU, endangered EN, and critically endangered CR (v. 2013.2, the data is current as of March 5, 2014).

== Order Procellariiformes (albatrosses and petrels) ==
Family Diomedeidae (albatrosses)

- Short-tailed albatross (Phoebastria albatrus) VU^{IUCN}

Family Procellariidae (shearwaters)

- Bermuda petrel (Pterodroma cahow) EN^{IUCN}
- Jamaican petrel (Pterodroma caribbaea) CR^{IUCN}
- White-necked petrel (Pterodroma cervicalis) VU^{IUCN}
- Cook's petrel (Pterodroma cookii) VU^{IUCN}
- Juan Fernández petrel (Pterodroma externa) VU^{IUCN}
- Black-capped petrel (Pterodroma hasitata) EN^{IUCN}
- Stejneger's petrel (Pterodroma longirostris) VU^{IUCN}
- Pycroft's petrel (Pterodroma pycrofti) VU^{IUCN}
- Hawaiian petrel (Pterodroma sandwichensis) EN^{IUCN}
- Buller's shearwater (Puffinus bulleri) VU^{IUCN}
- Pink-footed shearwater (Puffinus creatopus) VU^{IUCN}
- Newell's shearwater (Puffinus newelli) CR^{IUCN}

Family Hydrobatidae (storm petrels)

- Ashy storm petrel (Oceanodroma homochroa) EN^{IUCN}

== Order Anseriformes (waterfowl) ==
Family Anatidae (ducks, geese, and swans)

- Nene (Branta sandvicensis) NT^{IUCN}
- Laysan duck (Anas laysanensis) CR^{IUCN}
- Hawaiian duck (Anas wyvilliana) VU^{IUCN}
- Long-tailed duck (Clangula hyemalis) VU^{IUCN}
- Steller's eider (Polysticta stelleri) VU^{IUCN}

== Order Incertae sedis (uncertain placement) ==
Family Cathartidae (New World vultures)

- California condor (Gymnogyps californianus) CR^{IUCN}

== Order Galliformes (gamefowl) ==
Family Phasianidae (pheasants)

- Lesser prairie chicken (Tympanuchus pallidicinctus) VU^{IUCN}
- Greater prairie chicken (Tympanuchus cupido) NT^{IUCN}
- Gunnison sage-grouse (Centrocercus minimus) EN^{IUCN}

== Order Gruiformes (cranes, rails, and relatives) ==
Family Rallidae (rails)

- Hawaiian coot (Fulica alai) VU^{IUCN}

Family Gruidae (cranes)

- Whooping crane (Grus americana) EN^{IUCN}

== Order Charadriiformes (waders, gulls, and auks) ==
Family Laridae (gulls)

- Red-legged kittiwake (Rissa brevirostris) VU^{IUCN}

Family Scolopacidae (waders)

- Eskimo curlew (Numenius borealis) CR^{IUCN}
- Far Eastern curlew (Numenius madagascariensis) VU^{IUCN}
- Bristle-thighed curlew (Numenius tahitiensis) VU^{IUCN}

Family Alcidae (auks)

- Kittlitz's murrelet (Brachyramphus brevirostris) NT^{IUCN}
- Marbled murrelet (Brachyramphus marmoratus) EN^{IUCN}
- Craveri's murrelet (Synthliboramphus craveri) VU^{IUCN}
- Guadalupe murrelet (Synthliboramphus hypoleucus) VU^{IUCN}

== Order Psittaciformes (parrots) ==
Family Psittacidae (African and neotropical parrots)

- Thick-billed parrot (Rhynchopsitta pachyrhyncha) EN^{IUCN}

== Order Piciformes (woodpeckers and relatives) ==
Family Picidae (woodpeckers)

- Ivory-billed woodpecker (Campephilus principalis) CR^{IUCN}

== Order Passeriformes (perching birds) ==
Family Vireonidae (vireos)

- Black-capped vireo (Vireo atricapilla) NT^{IUCN}

Family Corvidae (crows and jays)

- Florida scrub jay (Aphelocoma coerulescens) VU^{IUCN}
- Island scrub jay (Aphelocoma insularis) VU^{IUCN}
- Pinyon jay (Gymnorhinus cyanocephalus) VU^{IUCN}

Family Hirundinidae (swallows)

- Bahama swallow (Tachycineta cyaneoviridis) EN^{IUCN}

Family Turdidae (thrushes)

- Bicknell's thrush (Catharus bicknelli) VU^{IUCN}
- Olomaʻo (Myadestes lanaiensis) CR^{IUCN}
- ʻŌmaʻo (Myadestes obscurus) VU^{IUCN}
- Puaiohi (Myadestes palmeri) CR^{IUCN}

Family Mimidae (mimids)

- Bendire's thrasher (Toxostoma bendirei) VU^{IUCN}

Family Motacillidae (wagtails and pipits)

- Sprague's pipit (Anthus spragueii) VU^{IUCN}

Family Parulidae (New World warblers)

- Bachman's warbler (Vermivora bachmanii) CR^{IUCN}
- Cerulean warbler (Setophaga cerulea) VU^{IUCN}
- Golden-cheeked warbler (Setophaga chrysoparia) EN^{IUCN}

Family Acrocephalidae (marsh- and tree-warblers)

- Millerbird (Acrocephalus familiaris) CR^{IUCN}

Family Emberizidae (New World sparrows)

- Worthen's sparrow (Spizella wortheni) EN^{IUCN}
- Saltmarsh sparrow (Ammodramus caudacutus) VU^{IUCN}

Family Icteridae (New World blackbirds)

- Tricolored blackbird (Agelaius tricolor) EN^{IUCN}
- Rusty blackbird (Euphagus carolinus) VU^{IUCN}

Family Fringillidae (finches)

- Oʻahu ʻamakihi (Hemignathus flavus) VU^{IUCN}
- Kauaʻi ʻamakihi (Hemignathus kauaiensis) VU^{IUCN}
- Nukupuʻu (Hemignathus lucidus) CR^{IUCN}
- ʻAkiapolaʻau (Hemignathus munroi) EN^{IUCN}
- ʻAnianiau (Magumma parva) VU^{IUCN}
- Palila (Loxioides bailleui) CR^{IUCN}
- ʻAkekeʻe (Loxops caeruleirostris) CR^{IUCN}
- ʻAkepa (Loxops coccineus) EN^{IUCN}
- Poʻouli (Melamprosops phaeosoma) CR^{IUCN}
- ʻAkikiki (Oreomystis bairdi) CR^{IUCN}
- Hawaiʻi creeper (Oreomystis mana) EN^{IUCN}
- ʻAkohekohe (Palmeria dolei) CR^{IUCN}
- Oʻahu ʻalauahio (Paroreomyza maculata) CR^{IUCN}
- Maui ʻalauahio (Paroreomyza montana) EN^{IUCN}
- Maui parrotbill (Pseudonestor xanthophrys) CR^{IUCN}
- Laysan finch (Telespiza cantans) VU^{IUCN}
- Nihoa finch (Telespiza ultima) CR^{IUCN}
- ʻIʻiwi (Vestiaria coccinea) VU^{IUCN}

Family Monarchidae (monarch flycatchers)

- Oʻahu ʻelepaio (Chasiempis ibidis) EN^{IUCN}
- Hawaiʻi ʻelepaio (Chasiempis sandwichensis) VU^{IUCN}
- Kauaʻi ʻelepaio (Chasiempis sclateri) VU^{IUCN}

== See also ==
- List of birds of the United States
