= Harold Douglas Pratt Jr. =

American ornithologist

Harold Douglas Pratt Jr. (born July 23, 1944, in Charlotte, North Carolina), often credited in the short form H. Douglas Pratt or as Doug Pratt, is an American ornithologist, bioacoustician, wildlife photographer, and bird illustrator. His main research field are the endemic avifaunas of Hawaii and other islands in the Pacific where he was one of the pioneers of the voice recordings of birds. Pratt is a Fellow of the American Ornithologists' Union.

In 1966, Pratt graduated to Bachelor of Science at the Davidson College in Davidson, North Carolina. With his dissertation A systematic analysis of the endemic Avifauna of the Hawaiian Islands he promoted to PhD at the Louisiana State University in 1979. Before he became curator of birds at the North Carolina State Museum of Natural Sciences in Raleigh he worked as research associate at the Louisiana State University in Baton Rouge from 1980 to 2005.

In 1975, Pratt was one of the last scientists who were able to photograph the extinct ʻōʻū and one of several scientists to record the song of the extinct Kauaʻi oʻo.

Pratt wrote important revisions within the genus Zosterops and the subfamily Drepanidinae. In 1987, he split the bridled white-eye into the three distinct species Zosterops conspicillatus, Zosterops semperi, and Zosterops hypolais. In 1979, he renamed Hemignathus wilsoni into Hemignathus munroi. In 1989, he moved the Kauai amakihi from the genus Himatione to the genus Hemignathus. In 2009, he suggested the new created genus Manucerthia for the Hawaiʻi creeper.

Besides his scientific work Pratt is also a musician. He plays autoharp and won the Walnut Valley Festival International Autoharp Championship in 2006. In 2012, he published his first record You Can't Play That on the Autoharp!

== Selected works ==
- 1987: A Field Guide to the Birds of Hawaii and the Tropical Pacific
- 1996: Hawaii's Beautiful Birds
- 1996: Pocket Guide to Hawaii's Birds
- 1999: Pocket Guide to Hawaii's Trees and Shrubs
- 2002: Enjoying Birds and Other Wildlife in Hawaii
- 2005: The Hawaiian Honeycreepers
- 2006: Flowering Trees: Images of Hawaii's Natural Beauty
- 2007: Birds: Images of Hawaii's Feathered Heritage
- 2008: Birds & Bats of Palau

Pratt has illustrated at least 20 books, including several plates in the Handbook of the Birds of the World and he created several bird and mammal paintings in the Encyclopædia Britannica, despite having no formal art training.
