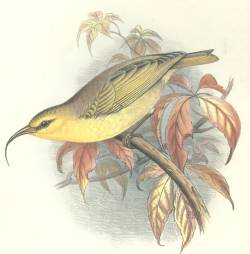

Conservation status
- Extinct (IUCN 3.1)

Scientific classification
- Kingdom: Animalia
- Phylum: Chordata
- Class: Aves
- Order: Passeriformes
- Family: Fringillidae
- Subfamily: Carduelinae
- Genus: Hemignathus
- Species: †H. lucidus

Binomial name
- †Hemignathus lucidus Lichtenstein, MHC, 1839

Synonyms
- Hemignathus lucidus lucidus

= Oʻahu nukupuʻu =

Extinct species of bird

The Oʻahu nukupuʻu (Hemignathus lucidus) is an extinct species of nukupuʻu, a type of Hawaiian honeycreeper native to Oahu, which was similar to its cousins from the Islands of Kauaʻi and Maui. It is yellowish greyish with a long hooked beak to find insects. This bird is now extinct due to human activity.

== Description ==
Turnaround video of a male specimen, Naturalis Biodiversity Center

The males were mostly yellow across the belly and on the head. From the bend of the wing, the feathers were primarily olive green. Its lores and legs were black. The females and the young had similar coloration with the exception that the yellow was a dull yellow. They had a long decurved beak approximately one and a half inch in length, the upper bill being twice as long as the lower.

Using their upper bill to pluck insects found underneath tree bark, the Oʻahu nukupuʻu fed on insects on flowering trees such as the koa (Acacia koa) and oʻhia (Metrosideros polymorpha). These trees attract a large amount of insects due to their nectar-filled flowers. The Oʻahu nukupuʻu fed on koa in high elevation forests and fed on oʻhia in low elevations.

The species was believed to have vanished as the spread of disease occurred, killing off nukupuʻu populations across the islands. In order to control the rat population in the sugar cane fields, mongooses were introduced to Hawaii and were suspected to be predators that stole nukupuʻu chicks from nests, furthering the decrease in nukupuʻu population.

Of the last known specimens recorded of the Oʻahu nukupuʻu, about nine specimens were collected in 1837 by naturalist Ferdinand Deppe and ornithologist John Kirk Townsend. A few more specimens were collected through 1841, and after an extensive search by ornithologist Robert Cyril Layton Perkins, the Oʻahu nukupuʻu was considered extinct since at the start of the 21st century.

== See also ==
- Hawaiian honeycreeper conservation
