= Kauaʻi finch =

Kaua'i finch

Scientific classification
- Kingdom: Animalia
- Phylum: Chordata
- Class: Aves
- Order: Passeriformes
- Family: Fringillidae
- Subfamily: Carduelinae
- Genus: Telespiza
- Species: T. persecutrix

Binomial name
- Telespiza persecutrix James & Olson, 1991

Extinct species of bird

The Kauai finch (Telespiza persecutrix) is an extinct bird in the genus Telespiza of the family Fringillidae. It was endemic to the Hawaiian islands of Kauai and Oahu. It is only known from fossil remains and likely became extinct before the first Europeans visited Hawaii in 1778.

== Description ==
The Kauai finch was about 5½ inch in length and had a very blunt bill that possibly could crack nuts and flowers (e.g., ‘ōhi‘a lehua blossoms) to digest the cellulose easily. It has also been speculated that insects perhaps formed part of its diet. The Kauai finch was believed to have once survived in highland forest, but its fossils have been found frequently at the lower elevations of the island.

== Extinction ==
Due to its early extinction, very little is known about this species. It is only known from a few bones found in caves. It appears that this species began to go extinct when the first Polynesians settlers came to the islands. They cleared some of the land for farming and introduced species for which the native birds had no defence. Five hundred years before Europeans made landfall to Hawaii, the bird was probably extinct. According to fossil records, their numbers declined rapidly in the early 16th century. It has been speculated that this species' visits to lower elevations was its undoing due to contact with avian diseases and pests. Finches were once known on all of the other larger Hawaiian islands, but the highland finch seems to have outlived the Oaho finch. Today, only about sixty percent of Hawaii have not been drastically altered. Many avian diseases and parasites also pose a major threat to Hawai`i's native forest birds.
