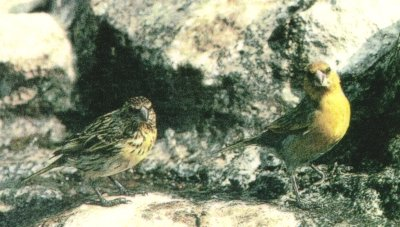
- Pair of Nīhoa finches (Telespiza ultima)

Scientific classification
- Kingdom: Animalia
- Phylum: Chordata
- Class: Aves
- Order: Passeriformes
- Family: Fringillidae
- Subfamily: Carduelinae
- Genus: Telespiza; Wilson, 1890

Type species
- Telespiza cantans S.B. Wilson, 1890

Species
- See text

= Telespiza =

Genus of birds

Telespiza is a genus of Hawaiian honeycreeper. All species in it are or were endemic to the Hawaiian Islands.

== Species ==
The genus contains the following two species:

Image	Scientific name	Common name	Distribution
	Telespiza cantans Wilson, 1890	Laysan finch	Northwestern Hawaiian Islands
	Telespiza ultima Bryan, 1917	Nīhoa finch	Nīhoa island

- †Telespiza persecutrix James & Olson, 1991 - Kauaʻi finch (prehistoric)
- †Telespiza ypsilon James & Olson, 1991 - Maui Nui finch (prehistoric)
