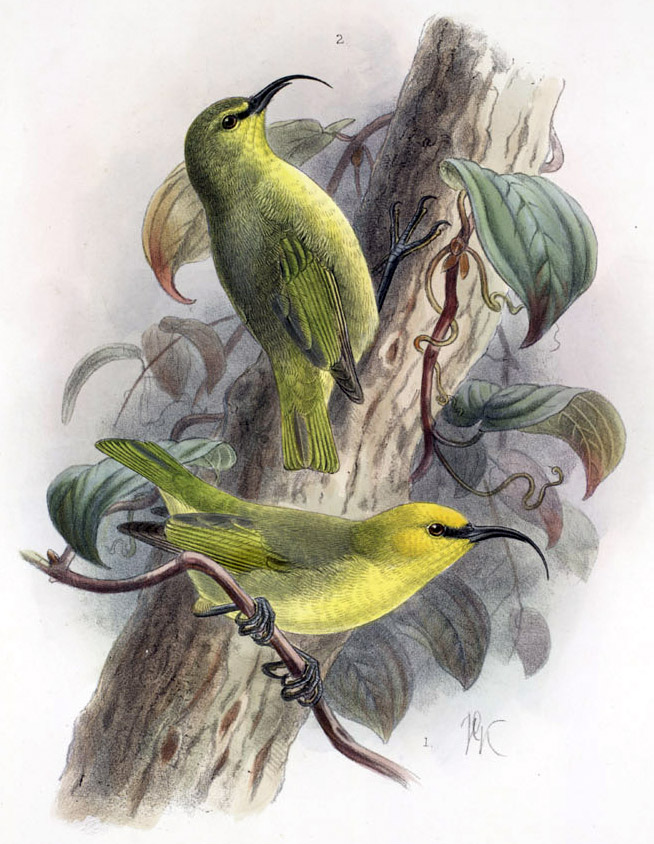
- Painting by Keulemans

Conservation status
- Extinct (1996) (IUCN 3.1)

Scientific classification
- Kingdom: Animalia
- Phylum: Chordata
- Class: Aves
- Order: Passeriformes
- Family: Fringillidae
- Subfamily: Carduelinae
- Genus: Hemignathus
- Species: †H. affinis

Binomial name
- †Hemignathus affinis Rothschild, 1893
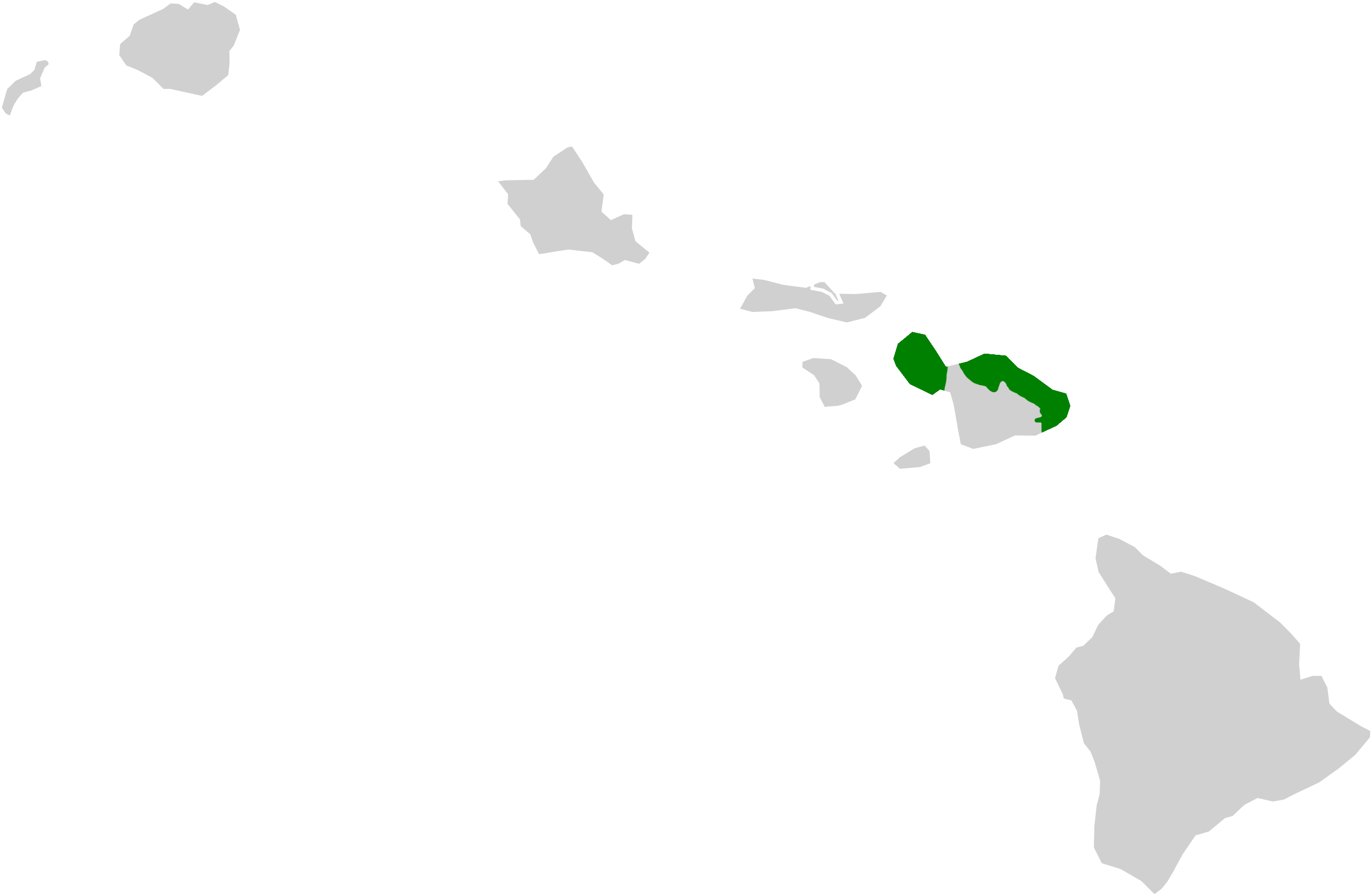

Synonyms
- Hemignathus lucidus affinis

= Maui nukupuʻu =

Species of bird

The Maui nukupuʻu (Hemignathus affinis) is a species of nukupuʻu Hawaiian honeycreeper that was endemic to the island of Maui in the Hawaiian Islands. The small, five-inch-long bird lived only in eastern Maui, where it was dependent on high-elevation mesic and wet forests of ʻōhiʻa lehua (Metrosideros polymorpha) and koa (Acacia koa). These two species of trees attract insects, causing the Maui nukupuʻu to have a higher chance of finding a meal near these trees. It was last sighted in the late 1990's, and is most likely extinct.

== Description ==
Turnaround video of a specimen, Naturalis Biodiversity Center

The males were colored green on the nape and head, and yellow on its face, neck, belly, and bottom. The females were completely olive green and were quieter than their male counterparts. Juveniles were gray and green. The bird's inch-long bill was used to peck for insects in the tree's bark.

== Population ==
This species existed in the Hanawi Area Reserve from 3,000 feet to 4,500 feet above sea level. It formerly survived at lower elevations and even in West Maui. It has only been sighted a few times in the 20th century. It was common in the 1900s, but by 1963 it was thought to be extinct. However, a rediscovery of the species in 1980 proved that the species survived. By the 1980s, the population was thought to be 28 birds as a best estimate. By 1994, that figure dropped down to only one or so birds, a male was sighted but was never seen again. There have been reports of this bird even in 2007; however, it seems that these birds are common ʻamakihi. Any surviving population would be under continuous pressure from habitat loss, habitat degradation by introduced ungulates, and avian malaria carried by introduced mosquitoes.

In 2021, the United States Fish and Wildlife Service declared that the species was most likely extinct, noting that extensive surveys for the bird had yielded no definite sightings and had only found Amakihi. On October 16, 2023, the species was delisted from the Endangered Species Act citing extinction.
