= Giant nukupuʻu =

Giant nukupuʻu Temporal range: Holocene

Scientific classification
- Kingdom: Animalia
- Phylum: Chordata
- Class: Aves
- Order: Passeriformes
- Family: Fringillidae
- Subfamily: Carduelinae
- Genus: Hemignathus
- Species: †H. vorpalis

Binomial name
- †Hemignathus vorpalis James & Olson, 2003

Extinct species of bird

The giant nukupuʻu (Hemignathus vorpalis) is an extinct species of finch in the family Fringillidae, which is only known from fossil remains. It was endemic to Hawaii. Its extinction is believed to have occurred within the last 3000 years, but exact timing and reasons remain unclear. It was larger and had a different bill morphology than the remaining members of the genus Hemignathus.
