= Maui Nui finch =

Maui Nui finch Temporal range: Holocene

Conservation status
- Extinct

Scientific classification
- Kingdom: Animalia
- Phylum: Chordata
- Class: Aves
- Order: Passeriformes
- Family: Fringillidae
- Subfamily: Carduelinae
- Genus: Telespiza
- Species: †T. ypsilon

Binomial name
- †Telespiza ypsilon James & Olson, 1991

Extinct species of bird

The Maui Nui finch (Telespiza ypsilon) is an extinct member of the genus Telespiza in the family Fringillidae. It was endemic to the Hawaiian islands of Molokai and Maui. It is only known from fossil remains and likely became extinct before the first Europeans visited Hawaii in 1778.

== Extinction ==
Due to its early extinction, very little is known about this species. It is only known from a few bones found in caves. It appears that this species began to go extinct when the first Polynesians settlers came to the islands. They cleared some of the land for farming and introduced species for which the native birds had no defence. According to fossil records, their numbers declined rapidly in the early 12th century. It has been speculated that this species' visits to lower elevations was its undoing due to contact with avian diseases and pests. Today, only about sixty percent of Hawaii has not been drastically altered. Many avian diseases and parasites also pose a major threat to Hawai'i's native forest birds.
