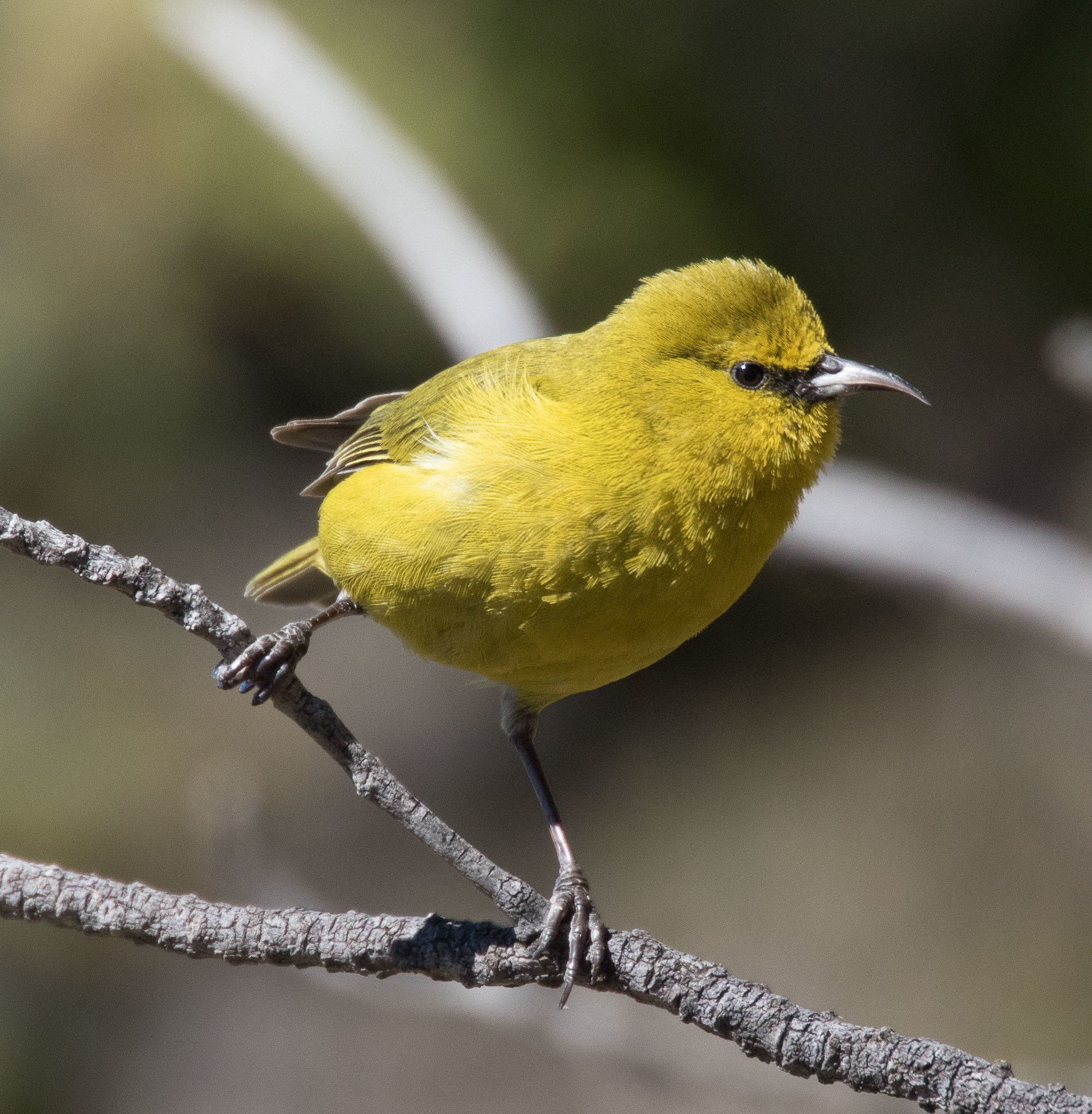
- Hawaiʻi ʻamakihi on Hawaii

Conservation status
- Least Concern (IUCN 3.1)

Scientific classification
- Kingdom: Animalia
- Phylum: Chordata
- Class: Aves
- Order: Passeriformes
- Family: Fringillidae
- Subfamily: Carduelinae
- Genus: Chlorodrepanis
- Species: C. virens

Binomial name
- Chlorodrepanis virens (Gmelin, JF, 1788)
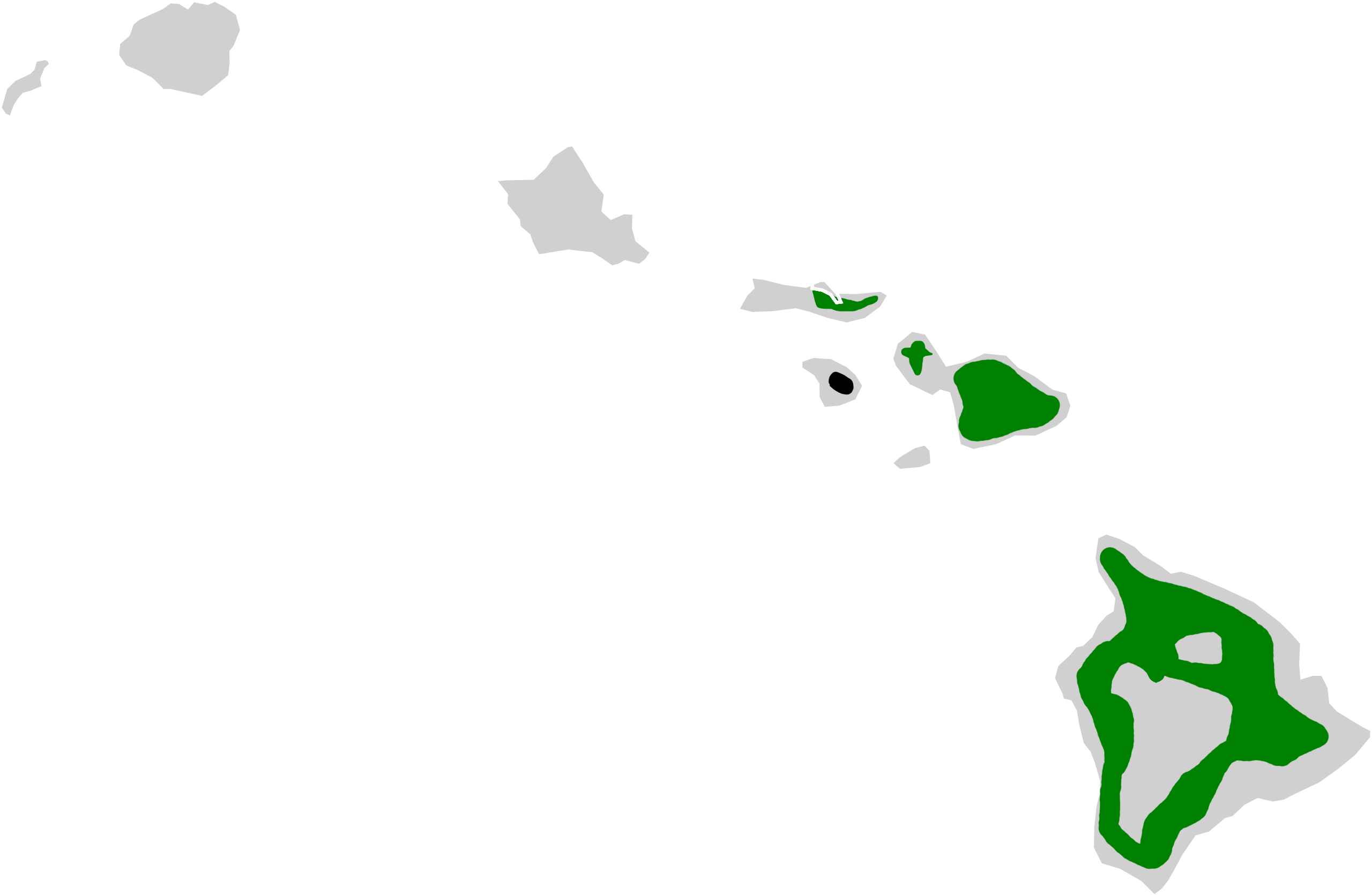
- Black: Extinct; Green: Current range

Synonyms
- Hemignathus virens

= Hawaiʻi ʻamakihi =

Species of bird

The Hawaiʻi ʻamakihi (Chlorodrepanis virens), also known as the common ʻamakihi, is a species of Hawaiian honeycreeper.

== Taxonomy ==
The Hawaiʻi ʻamakihi was formerly placed in the genus Hemignathus but was assigned to the genus Chlorodrepanis based on the phylogenetic analysis of mitochondrial and nuclear DNA sequences.

There are two recognized subspecies: C. v. wilsoni on Maui, Molokaʻi, and (formerly) Lānaʻi, and C. v. virens on the Big Island of Hawaiʻi.

== Distribution and habitat ==
It is found on the Big Island, Maui, and Molokaʻi in Hawaii. It formerly occurred on Lānaʻi where it was last seen in 1976.

It is one of the most common honeycreepers, inhabiting all types of habitat, dry māmane forests to mesic and wet forests, on the islands at elevations from sea level to 8,000 feet (2,400 m). On Maui they have also been successful in forests of introduced pines, cypresses and firs. Of all the forest birds native to Hawaii, the Hawaiʻi ʻamakihi has been affected the least by habitat changes. It is suspected that it is evolving resistance to diseases such as avian malaria. Along with the ʻApapane, it is one of the two Hawaiian honeycreepers listed by the IUCN as being of least concern.

== Description ==
The Hawaiʻi ʻamakihi is a small bird, measuring about 10 centimetres (3.9 in) in length. It is yellow-green with a small black bill that is 1.3 centimetres (0.51 in) long and has brown eyes with black pupils.

=== Vocalization ===
The primary song of the Hawaiʻi ʻamakihi is a rapid trill.

== Diet ==
The Hawaiʻi ʻamakihi has a very wide diet, and has been able to find food despite habitat alteration. It has a tubular tongue, which it uses to drink nectar from flowers such as those of the ʻōhiʻa lehua (Metrosideros polymorpha), ʻākala (Rubus hawaiensis), and māmane (Sophora chrysophylla). If necessary, it will suck juice from fruits. The Hawaiʻi ʻamakihi also hunts for spiders and insects among trees and shrubs.

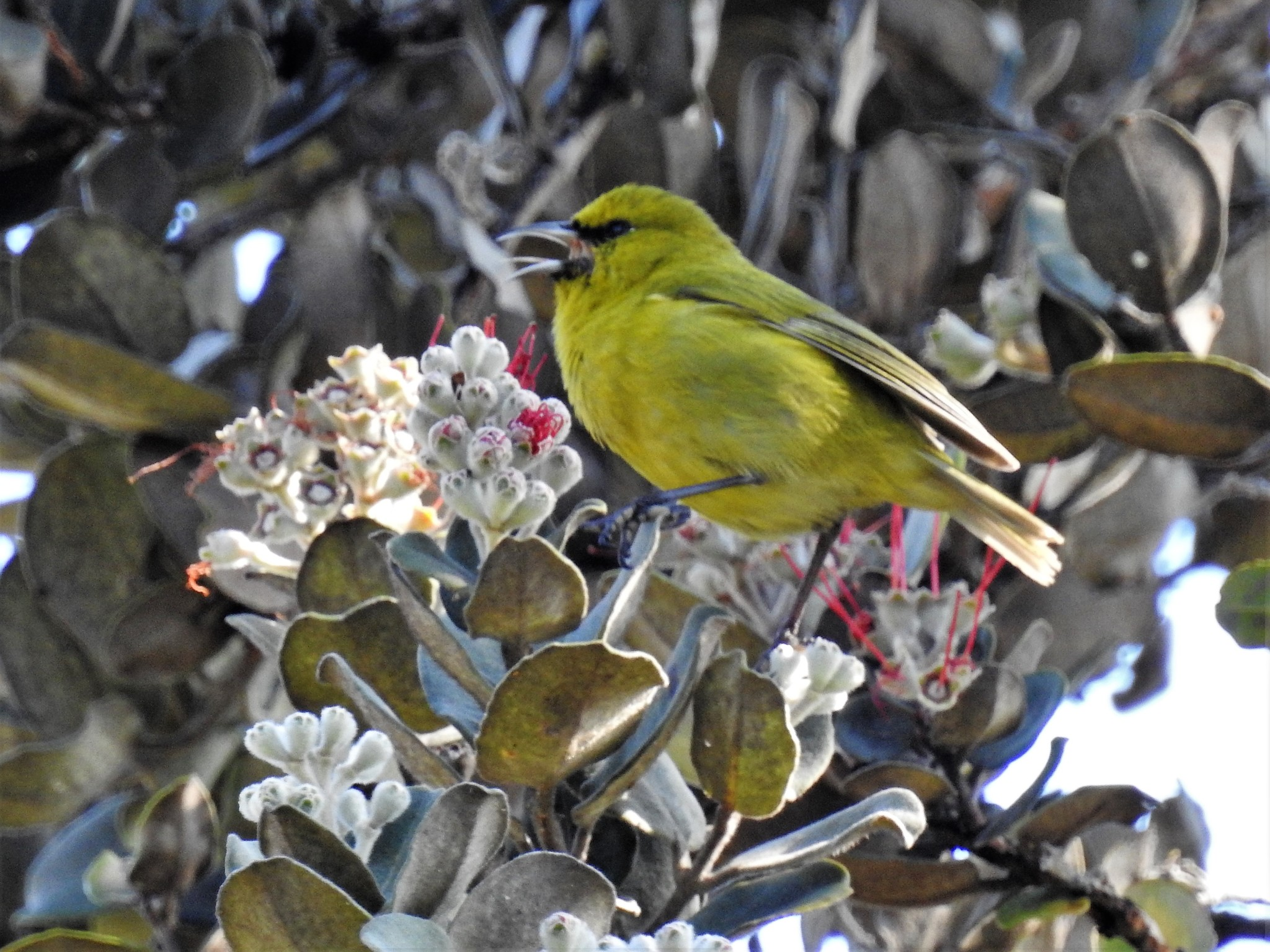
C. v. virens on ʻōhiʻa lehua

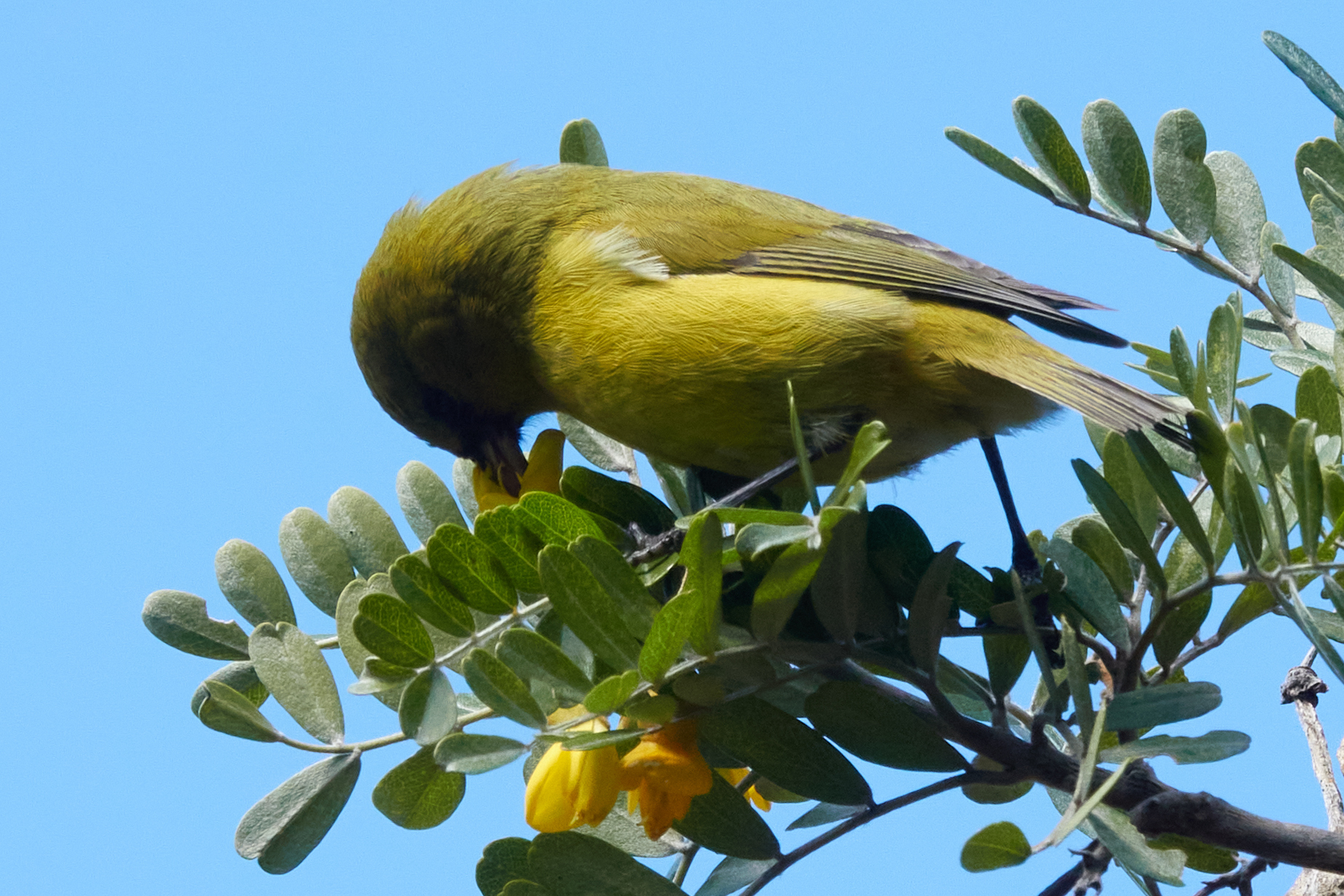
C. v. wilsoni drinking māmane nectar

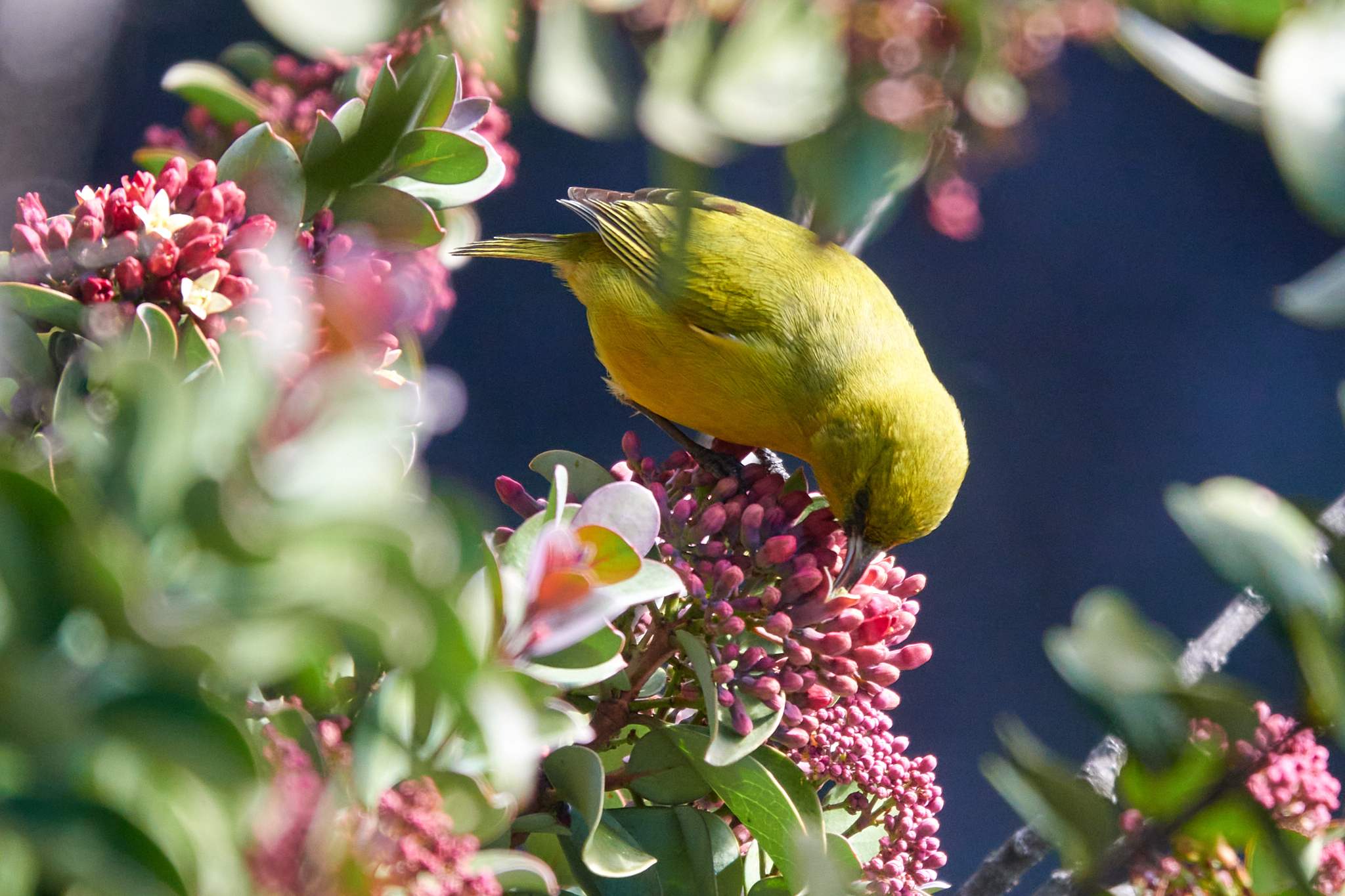
C. v. wilsoni drinking 'Iliahi nectar

== Reproduction ==
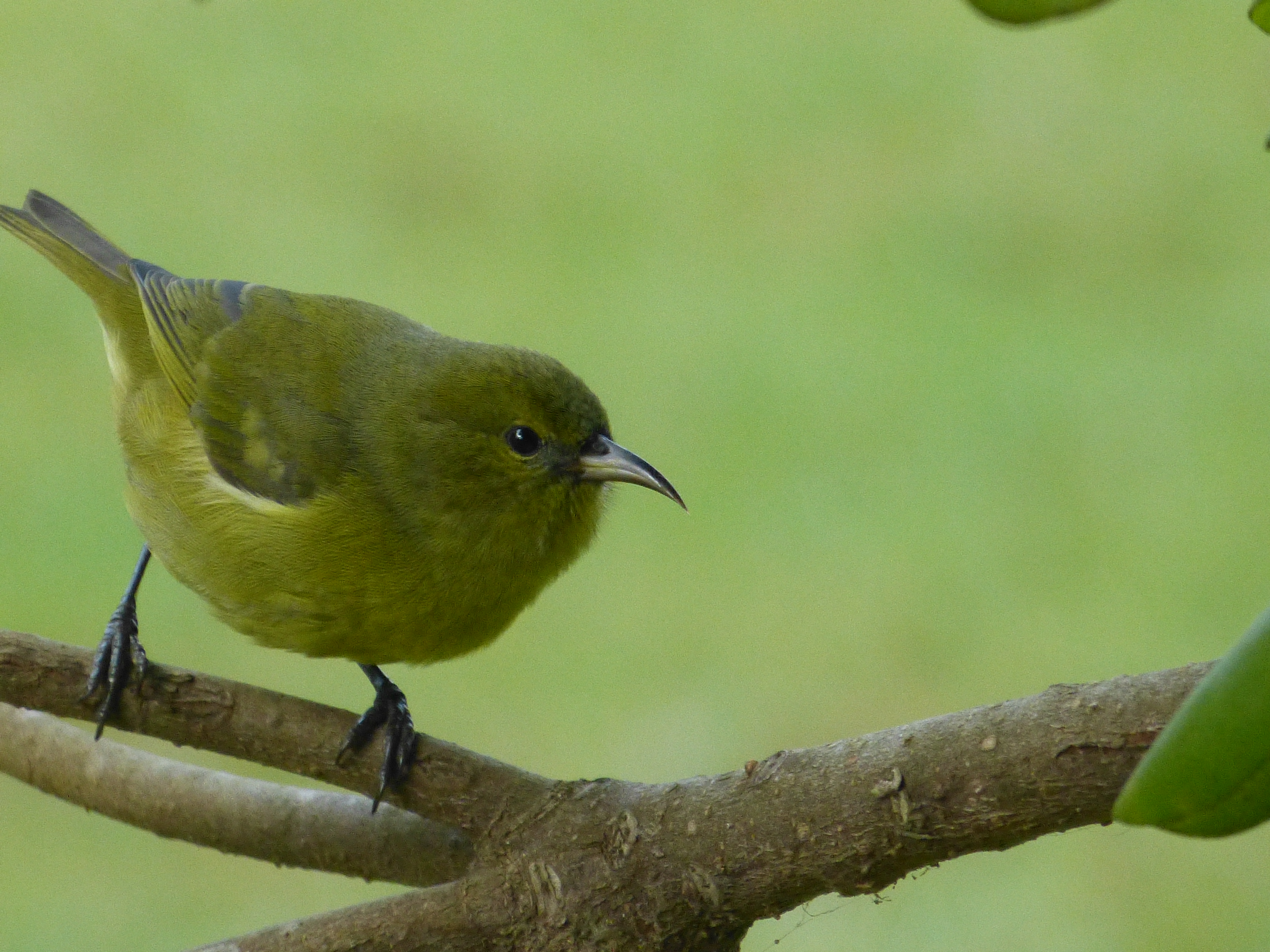
Hawaiʻi ʻamakihi on Maui

Hawaiʻi ʻamakihi are a productive species with a long breeding season, lasting about 9 months. On the Big Island, Maui and Molokaʻi there is variation in when that breeding season starts but it may coincide with flowering of māmane in dry māmane forests. Hawaiʻi ʻamakihi nest in the canopy of trees. They often are able to have two broods within a breeding season; having two rounds of chicks enables their population to increase more rapidly than slow growing species like the endangered Kiwikiu. Chicks remain in the nest for 15-21 days before they fledge. Young Hawaiʻi ʻamakihi become independent from their parents at 2-3 months.
