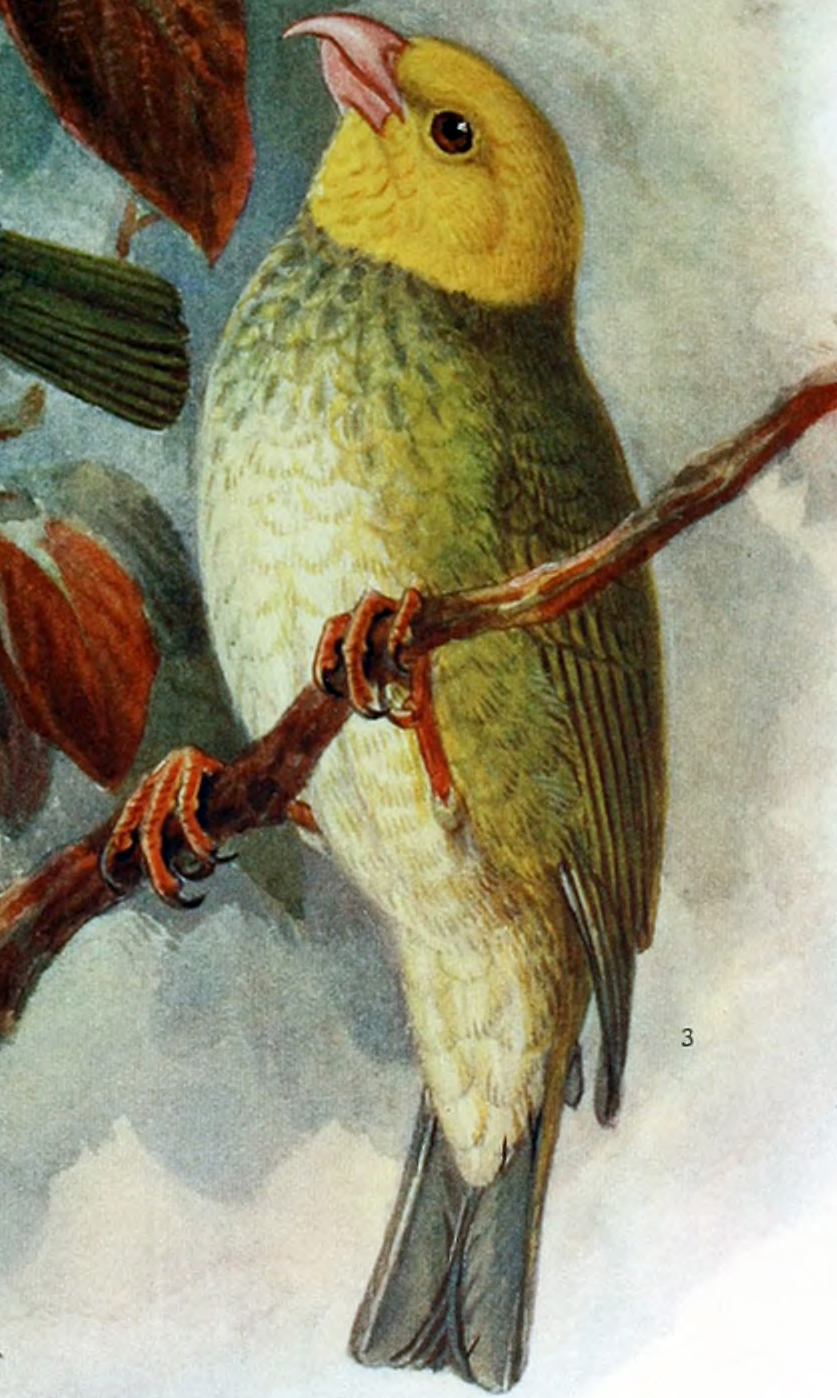
- Keulemans illustration

Conservation status
- Extinct (1989) (IUCN 3.1)

Scientific classification
- Kingdom: Animalia
- Phylum: Chordata
- Class: Aves
- Order: Passeriformes
- Family: Fringillidae
- Subfamily: Carduelinae
- Genus: †Psittirostra; Temminck, 1820
- Species: †P. psittacea

Binomial name
- †Psittirostra psittacea (Gmelin, 1789)
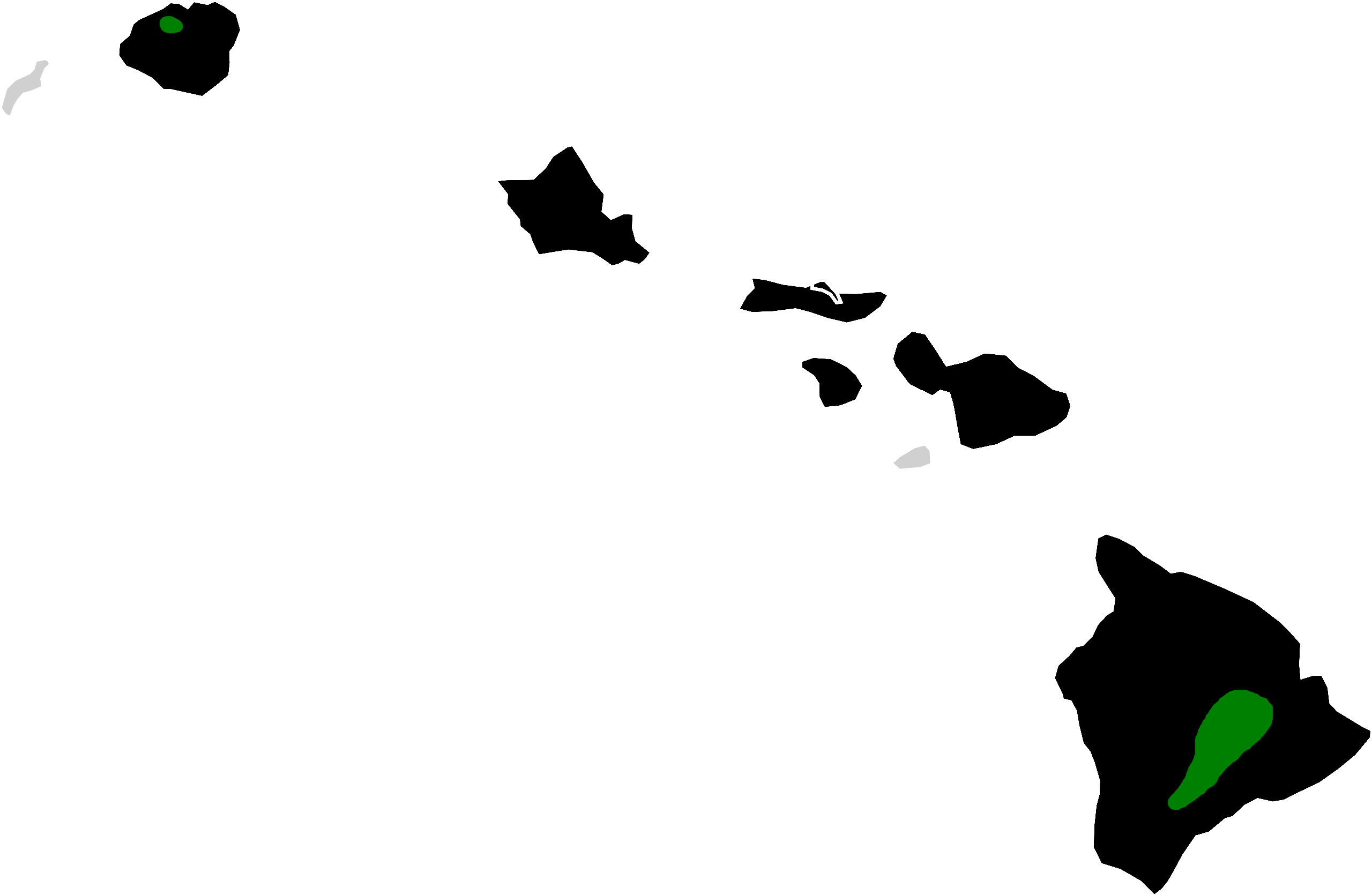
- Black: Extinct (1989); Green: Current range

= ʻŌʻū =

Species of bird

The ʻōʻū (pronounced [ˈʔoː.ʔuː]) (Psittirostra psittacea) is an extinct species of Hawaiian honeycreeper that was endemic to the Hawaiian islands. It had a dark green back and olive green underparts; males had a yellow head while females had a green head. Its unusual beak seems to have been adapted to feeding on the fruits of Freycinetia arborea. It had a strong flight which it used to fly considerable distances in search of this vine, but it also ate other fruits, buds, flowers and insects.

Although formerly widespread and present throughout the island group, numbers declined dramatically during the twentieth century. The bird had been listed by the International Union for Conservation of Nature as being Critically Endangered since 1994, but in 2024 it was assessed as extinct. The U.S. Fish and Wildlife Service had separately declared the bird extinct in a 2022 study review. The last recorded sighting was in 1989.

== Description ==
Turnaround video of a male specimen at Naturalis Biodiversity Center

The ʻōʻū was a large, plump forest bird measuring 17 centimetres (6.7 in) in length. Males had a bright yellow head, dark green back, and an olive-green belly. Females were duller with an olive-green head. The ʻōʻū had a pink, finch-like bill and pink legs. It was very similar in morphology to a parrot; both the genus and specific epithets allude to this ("psitta" means "parrot" in Greek").

== Behavior ==
The breeding biology of this bird is unknown, although juveniles were observed in June, suggesting a March to May breeding season. The ʻōʻū's call was an ascending or descending whistle that may break into a sweet and distinct canary-like song.

Its unique bill was apparently adapted for feeding on the fruits of the ʻieʻie (Freycinetia arborea) vine, although when the fruiting season ended the ʻōʻū readily moved both up– and downslope in search of other foods, both native and introduced. In addition to fruits, it fed on insects, and buds and blossoms of the ʻōhiʻa lehua (Metrosideros polymorpha). It was known to have been a nomadic forager that made strong flights to follow seasonally available fruit crops across a broad elevational gradient.

== Status ==
Though it was formerly widespread on the six largest islands of that group, this Hawaiian honeycreeper declined precipitously from the turn of the 20th century. The last recorded sighting was in 1989 on Kauaʻi. It is almost certainly extinct there, but unconfirmed reports occasionally are received from the areas above the Kīlauea volcano on the island of Hawaiʻi. As a consequence, it was retained as Possibly Extinct by The Nature Conservancy for more than three decade after that occurrence. The Nature Conservancy, BirdLife International, and IUCN all now regard the ʻōʻū as Presumed Extinct with no known extant individuals. The largest and most secure population above Waiākea were driven from its habitat in 1984 when the area was devastated by a lava flow from Mauna Loa. The ʻōʻū was restricted to the mid-elevation ʻōhiʻa lehua (Metrosideros polymorpha) forests of the Big Island and the Alakaʻi Wilderness Preserve on Kauaʻi. More recently it became restricted to ʻōhiʻa lehua forest.

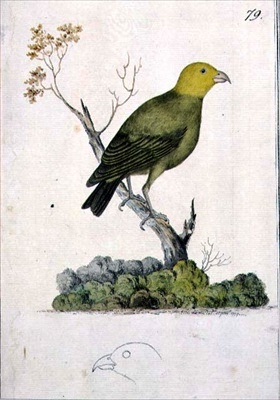
Illustration by William Ellis

The ʻōʻū was one of the most mobile species of Hawaiian honeycreepers. Although it was not very active and usually slow-moving, it had remarkable stamina and when flying, would cover great distances. It is one of the few Hawaiian endemics that did occur on all the major islands at one time and did not differentiate into subspecies, suggesting that birds crossed between islands on a regular basis. Also, there was considerable seasonal movement between different altitudes according to the availability of the species' favorite food, the bracts and fruit of the ʻieʻie (Freycinetia arborea). This probably was the species' undoing, as it thus came in contact with mosquitoes transmitting avian malaria and fowlpox, which are exceptionally lethal to most Hawaiian honeycreepers. Other significant threats to this species were habitat loss and introduced predators. Island species are particularly vulnerable to one or more of these threats because of their low numbers and restricted geographical distributions.

== Protection ==
The ʻōʻū was listed as an endangered species in 1967 under the Endangered Species Act. The Kauaʻi Forest Birds Recovery Plan was published in 1983 and the Hawaiʻi Forest Birds Recovery Plan was published in 1984. These recovery plans recommend active land management, controlling the spread of introduced plants and animals, closely monitoring new land activity or development to prevent further destruction of forest bird habitat, and the establishment of captive propagation and sperm bank programs. The ʻōʻū was last seen in the ʻOlaʻa area (Olaa Forest) of the Big Island. Today this area is protected by a multiparty group including state, federal, and private entities.

== Extinction ==
The species experienced a huge decline in the 20th century. At that time, invasive species were introduced, such as feral cats, small Indian mongooses, and mosquitoes. The mosquitoes spread diseases that the birds couldn't be immune to. The cats and mongooses hunted these birds, and rats ate their eggs. The species was last seen in 1989, and in 2024, the IUCN declared it extinct.
