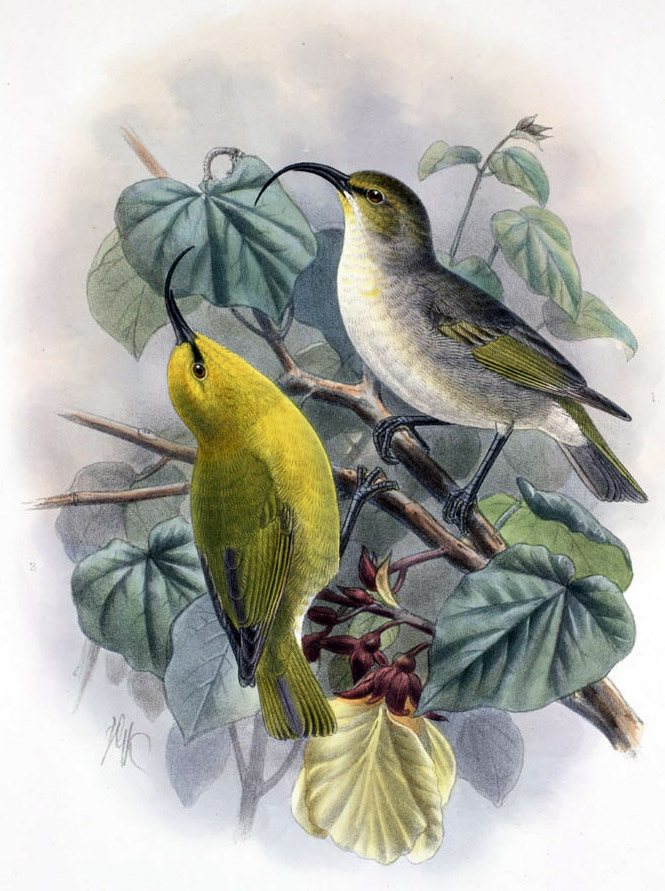
- Illustration by Keulemans

Conservation status
- Extinct (1899) (IUCN 3.1)

Scientific classification
- Kingdom: Animalia
- Phylum: Chordata
- Class: Aves
- Order: Passeriformes
- Family: Fringillidae
- Subfamily: Carduelinae
- Genus: Hemignathus
- Species: †H. hanapepe

Binomial name
- †Hemignathus hanapepe Wilson, SB, 1889
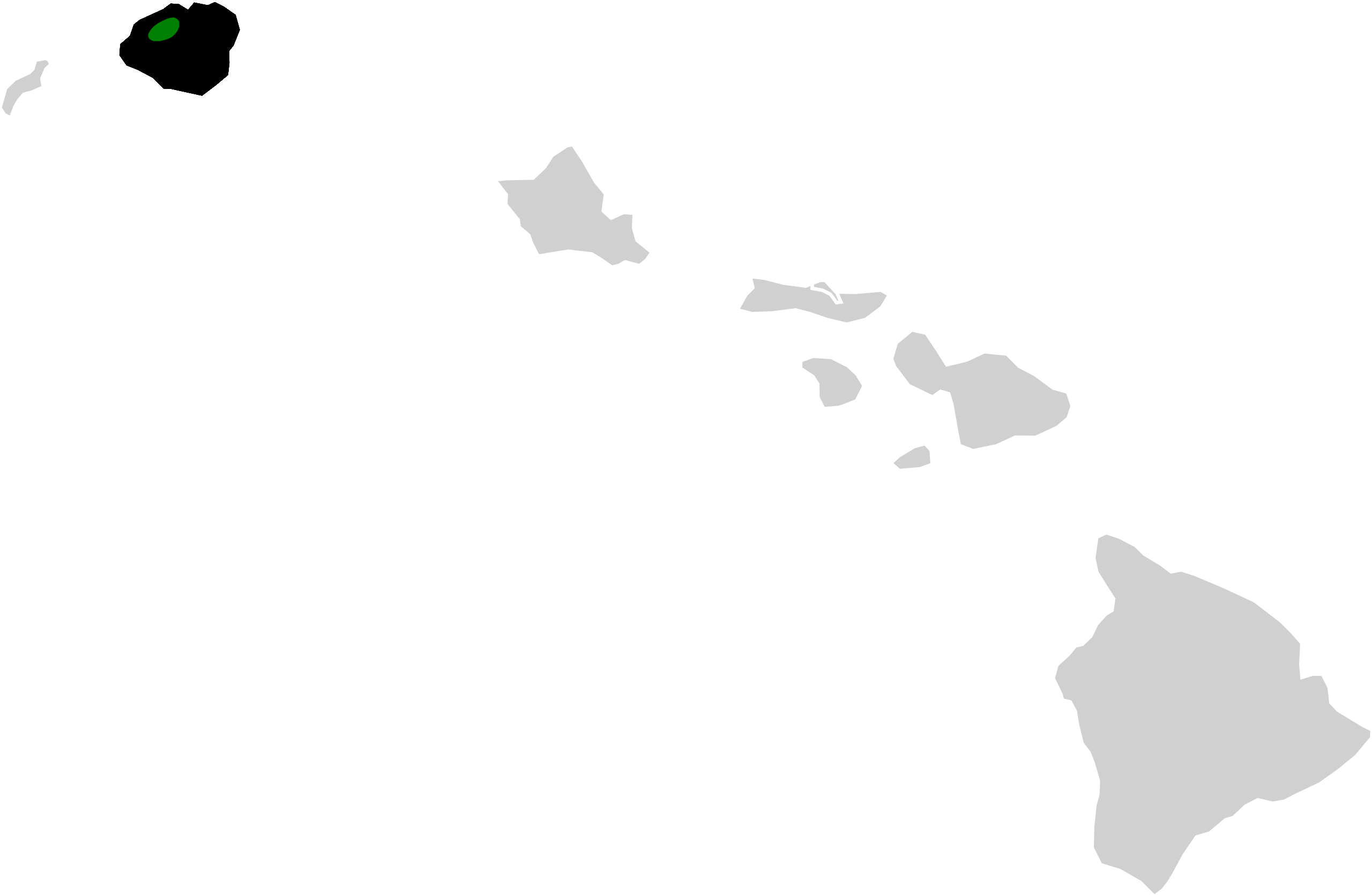
- Black: Extinct; Green: Current range

Synonyms
- Hemignathus lucidus hanapepe

= Kauaʻi nukupuʻu =

Species of bird

The Kauaʻi nukupuʻu (Hemignathus hanapepe) is an extinct species of nukupuʻu once found throughout parts of the Hawaiian island of Kauaʻi. It was an insect eater that picked out its tiny prey from tree bark. The males were yellowish with brown wings, while the females were grayish brown with a yellow throat streak.

== Conservation ==
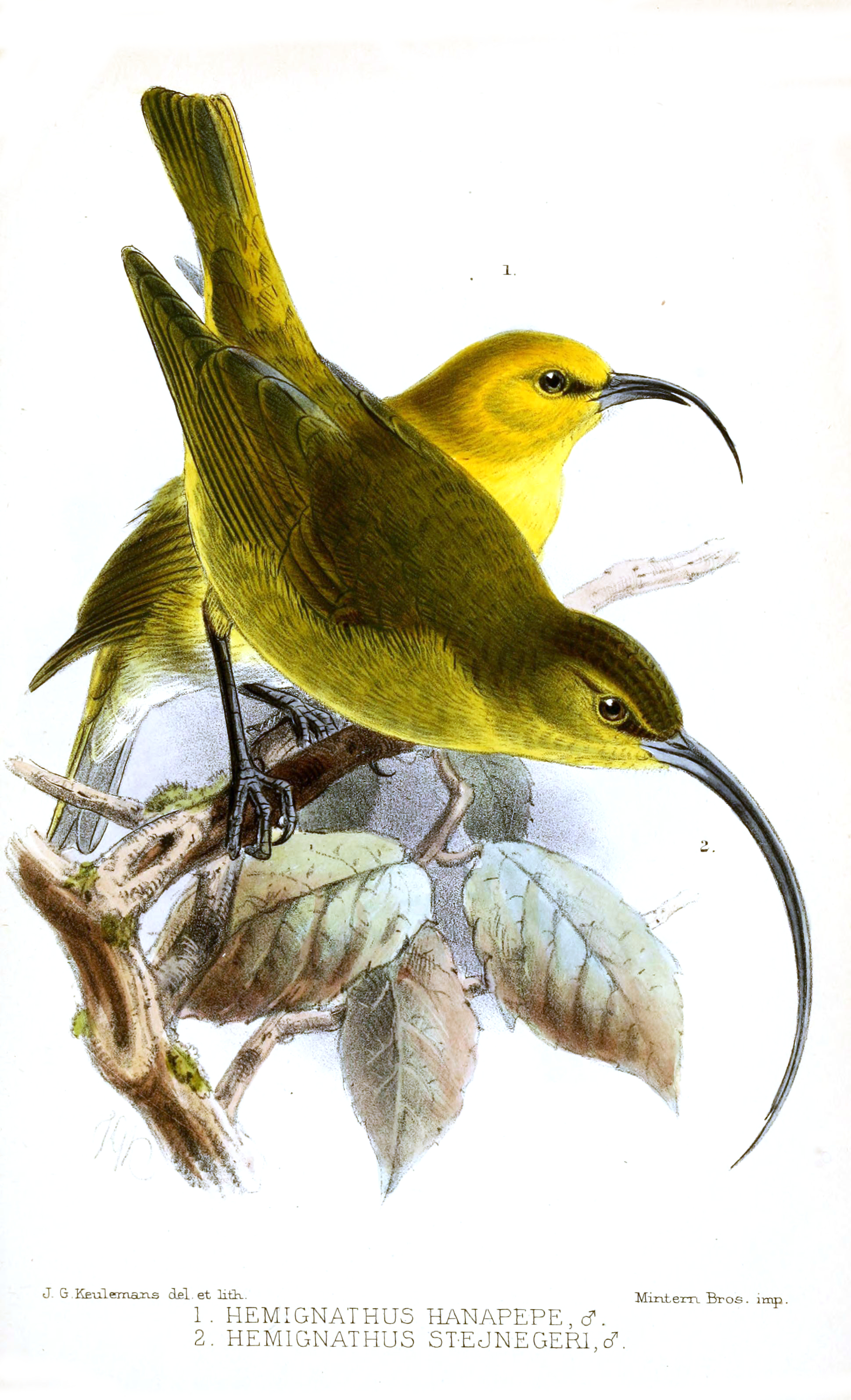
Illustration from The Ibis, the brighter bird in the back

The species was abundant until the 19th century, when the loss of its lowland forests to slash and burn farming methods damaged its habitat. By 1889, this bird was very rare, though it could still be found in small flocks in the higher forests. The last confirmed sighting was in 1899; if the species survived after this time, it likely became confined to the Alakaʻi Wilderness Preserve. From 1984-1998, it was recorded several times in this area, but later analysis of these sightings indicates that almost all these observations were likely of Kauaʻi ʻamakihi (Chlorodrepanis stejnegeri). It was also feared that the winds from Hurricane Iniki in 1992 could have created more damage to the bird's habitat. Intensive searches for this species throughout the 1990s were unsuccessful, although a single unconfirmed report was made in 2007. The species was likely already extinct by 1906, but the recency of some of the unconfirmed sightings indicates that the species should likely not be classified as extinct unless there is no doubt that it is. In September 2021, the U.S. Fish and Wildlife Service proposed that the Kauaʻi nukupuʻu should be declared extinct, citing fruitless and extensive surveys. In October 2023, the species was delisted from the Endangered Species Act citing extinction.
