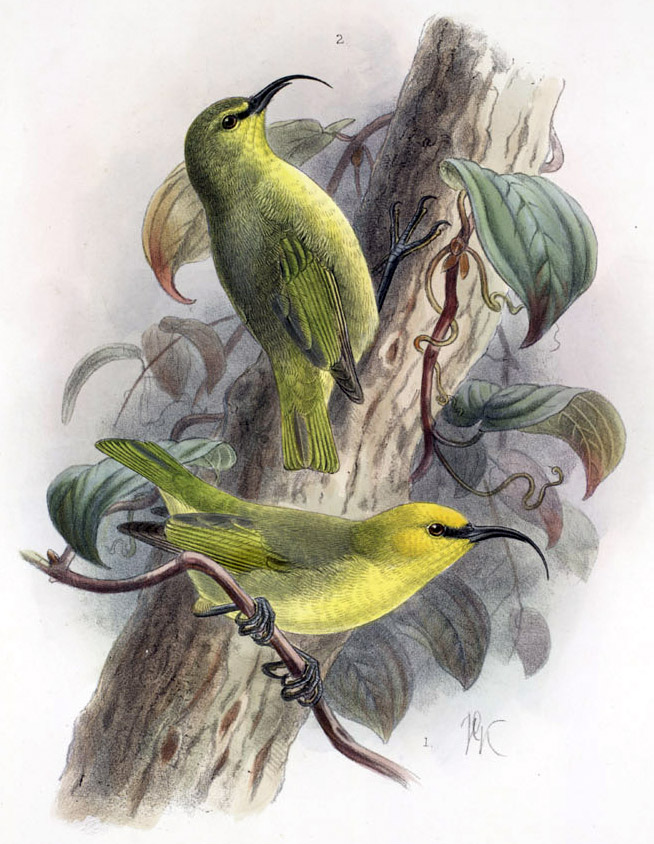
- Maui nukupuʻu (Hemignathus affinis)

Scientific classification
- Kingdom: Animalia
- Phylum: Chordata
- Class: Aves
- Order: Passeriformes
- Family: Fringillidae
- Subfamily: Carduelinae
- Genus: Hemignathus; Lichtenstein, MHC, 1839

Type species
- Hemignathus lucidus M.H.C. Lichtenstein, 1839

Species
- See text

= Hemignathus =

Genus of birds

Hemignathus is a genus of Hawaiian honeycreepers in the subfamily Carduelinae of the family Fringillidae. All species are endemic to Hawaii.

== Extinctions ==
Many of its species became extinct during the 19th and 20th centuries due to a combination of habitat destruction, introduced predators, and most importantly mosquito-borne diseases. The ʻakiapōlāʻau (Hemignathus wilsoni) may be the last surviving species in the genus.

One species, the giant nukupu'u (Hemignathus vorpalis), is known only from fossils, and became extinct in prehistoric times when Polynesian settlers deforested the lowlands for agriculture.

== Taxonomy ==
There are 5 species in this genus, 4 of which are extinct:

Image	Common name	Scientific name
	†Maui nukupuʻu	†Hemignathus affinis - extinct, 1896
	†Kauaʻi nukupuʻu	†Hemignathus hanapepe - extinct, 1899
	†Oʻahu nukupuʻu	†Hemignathus lucidus - extinct, 1800s
	†Giant nukupuʻu	†Hemignathus vorpalis - extinct, Holocene
	ʻAkiapolaʻau	Hemignathus wilsoni
