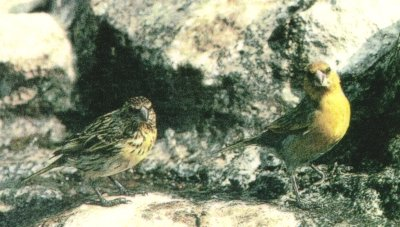
- Male (right) and female (left) pair of Nīhoa finches

Conservation status
- Critically Endangered (IUCN 3.1)

Scientific classification
- Kingdom: Animalia
- Phylum: Chordata
- Class: Aves
- Order: Passeriformes
- Family: Fringillidae
- Subfamily: Carduelinae
- Genus: Telespiza
- Species: T. ultima

Binomial name
- Telespiza ultima Bryan, 1917

= Nīhoa finch =

Species of bird

The Nīhoa finch (Telespiza ultima)(Hawaiian: palihoa) is one of the two endemic bird species of the tiny Hawaiian island of Nīhoa, the other being the Nīhoa millerbird. The island's population is 1000–3000 birds. The Nīhoa finch was added to the Endangered Species List by the U.S. Fish and Wildlife Service on March 11, 1967. An attempt to protect the species against extinction was made by starting a colony on French Frigate Shoals, another leeward island. This would ensure its continued existence in case the Nīhoa population was wiped out. This attempt, however, failed. Nīhoa is part of a group of islands that make up the Hawaiian Islands National Wildlife Refuge which provides protected land for the Nīhoa finch to roam on. In August 2026, 49 Nīhoa finch were translocated to Kapou Island, also known as Lisianski Island/Papaʻāpoho, to establish an insurance population, the third single-island species translocation in the NW Hawaiian Islands after Laysan Finch and Nīhoa Millerbird.

== Description ==
The Nīhoa finch looks much like the Laysan finch but is smaller, and less dark. The birds have a yellow throat and the front is streaked with brown; the head and back are brown streaked with black. It measures about 6 inches in length.

== Diet ==
The diet of this bird includes items like sea birds' eggs, small arthropods, and the seeds and flowers of some of the native flora. Nīhoa finches build their nests in small spaces in rocky cliffs about 100 to 800 feet above the sea level. The breeding season begins in February and might go on till early July, ending with a clutch of usually three eggs. The Nīhoa finch will get its adult plumage in about a single year.
