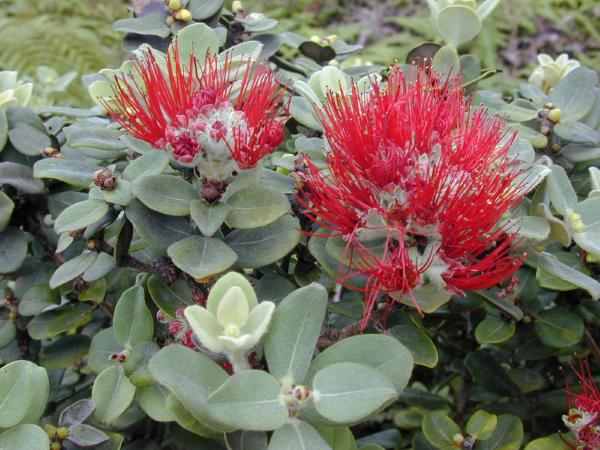
- ʻŌhiʻa lehua flowers

Conservation status
- Vulnerable (IUCN 3.1)

- Secure (NatureServe)

Scientific classification
- Kingdom: Plantae
- Clade: Tracheophytes
- Clade: Angiosperms
- Clade: Eudicots
- Clade: Rosids
- Order: Myrtales
- Family: Myrtaceae
- Genus: Metrosideros
- Species: M. polymorpha

Binomial name
- Metrosideros polymorpha Gaudich.

Varieties
- M. p. var. dieteri M. p. var. glaberrima M. p. var. incana M. p. var. macrophylla M. p. var. newelli M. p. var. polymorpha M. p. var. pumila M. p. var. pseudorugosa

Synonyms
- List: Metrosideros collina f. lurida rock; Metrosideros collina f. sericea Rock; Metrosideros collina f. strigosa Rock; Metrosideros collina subsp. polymorpha (Gaudich.) Rock; Metrosideros collina var. glaberrima (H.Lév.) Rock; Metrosideros collina var. glabrifolia (A.Heller) Rock; Metrosideros collina var. haleakalesis Rock; Metrosideros collina var. hemilanata Hochr.; Metrosideros collina var. imbricata Rock; Metrosideros collina var. incana (H.Lév.) Rock; Metrosideros collina var. macrophylla Rock; Metrosideros collina var. newellii Rock; Metrosideros collina var. prostrata Rock; Metrosideros collina var. pumila (A.Heller) Rock; Metrosideros hillebrandii H.Lév. & Vaniot; Metrosideros pumila (A.Heller) Hochr.; Nania glabrifolia A.Heller; Nania polymorpha (Gaudich.) A.Heller; Nania pumila A.Heller

= Metrosideros polymorpha =

ʻŌhiʻa lehua

Species of plant

Metrosideros polymorpha, the ʻōhiʻa lehua, is a species of flowering evergreen tree in the myrtle family, Myrtaceae, that is endemic to the six largest islands of Hawaiʻi. It is a member of the diverse Metrosideros genus, which are widespread over the southwest Pacific. It is the state endemic tree of Hawaiʻi.

It is a highly variable tree, being 20–25 m (66–82 ft) tall in favorable situations, and a much smaller prostrate shrub when growing in boggy soils or directly on basalt. It produces a brilliant display of flowers, made up of a mass of stamens, which can range from fiery red to yellow. Many native Hawaiian traditions refer to the tree and the forests it forms as sacred to Pele, the volcano goddess, and to Laka, the goddess of hula. ʻŌhiʻa trees grow easily on lava, and are usually the first plants to grow on new lava flows.

Metrosideros polymorpha is commonly called a lehua tree, or an ʻōhiʻa lehua, or simply an ʻōhiʻa; all are correct, although ʻōhiʻa is also used to refer to the tomato as well as certain varieties of sugarcane and taro. There is a widespread but mistaken notion that the Hawaiian word ʻōhiʻa refers only to the tree and that the word lehua refers only to its flowers.

== Description ==
Metrosideros polymorpha is relatively slow growing and may occur as a tall tree or a prostrate shrub, and everything in between. It can grow up to 30 m (98 ft) in height. The trunk varies in form. In some trees, it is straight and smooth; in others, it is twisted and prominently fluted.

Flowers are usually bright to medium red but orange-red, salmon, pink, yellow, or orange forms are also found. The flowers appear in clusters on the terminal ends of the branches. Masses of stamens extend from the flower and give the blossoms their characteristic pom-pom shape. The stomata of the leaves are able to close up in the presence of harmful gases, which gives it an advantage over many non-native trees.

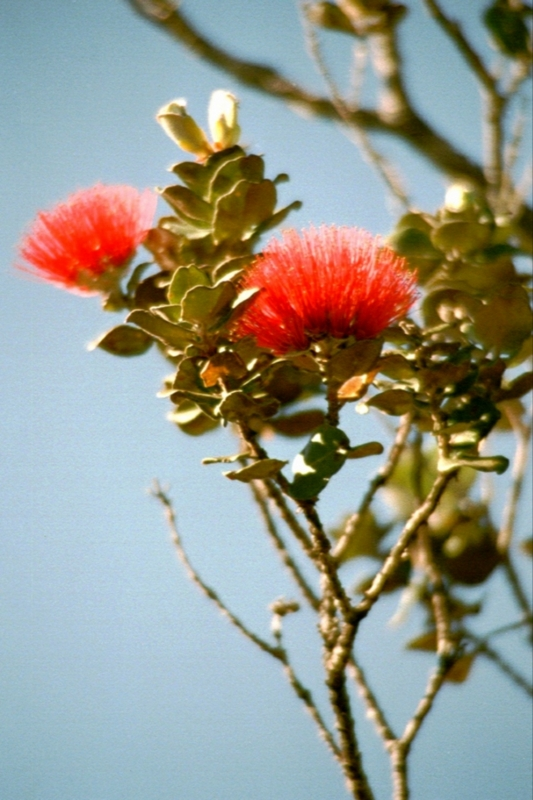
Lehua blossoms

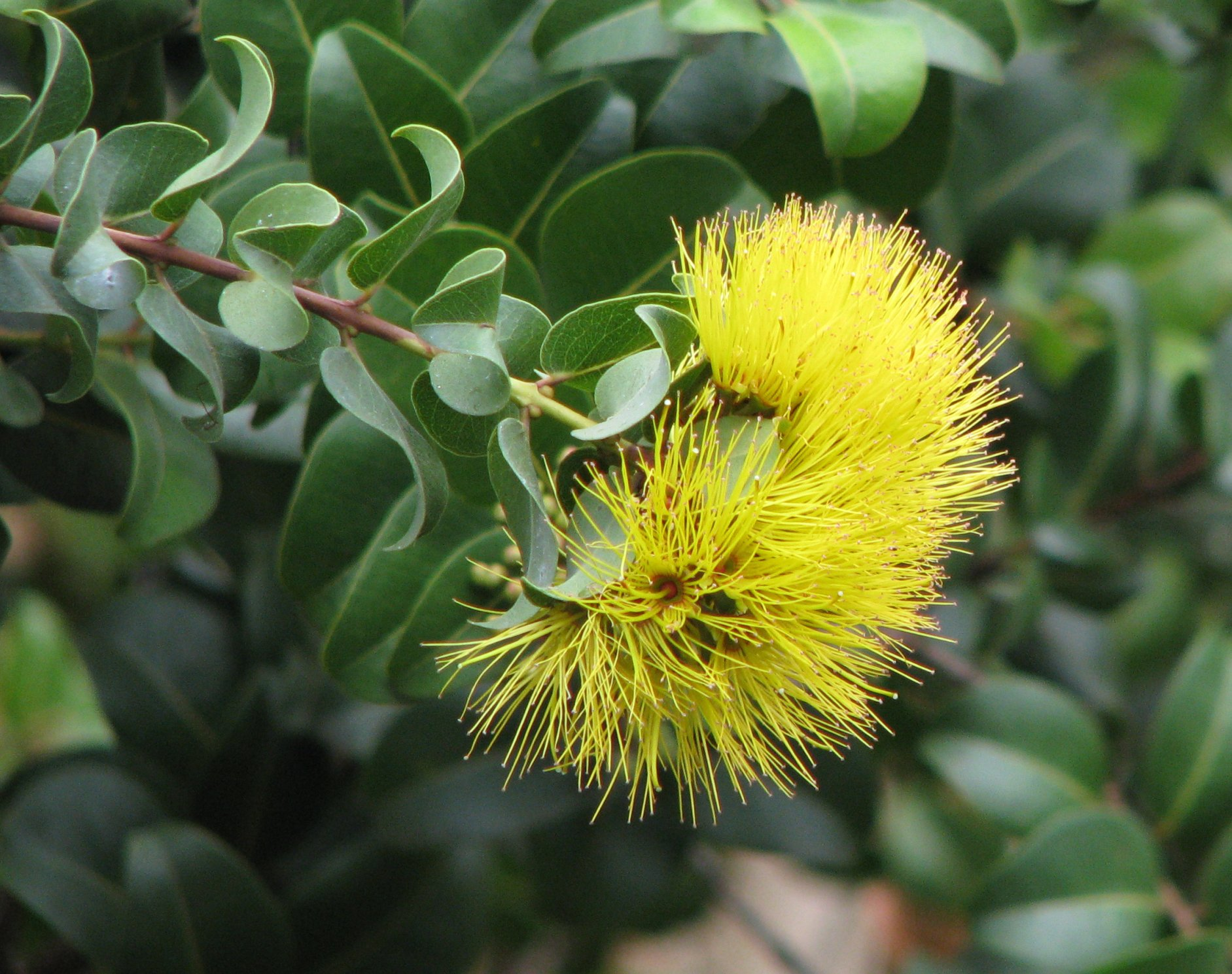
Yellow flower variant

=== Similar species ===
There are about 50 species in the genus Metrosideros in Southeast Asia and the Pacific and as well one species in South Africa. The Hawaiian Islands are home to five species of Metrosideros that are endemic to the islands, meaning they are found nowhere else in the world. These are: Metrosideros polymorpha, M. macropus, M. rugosa, M. tremuloides, and M. waialealae. The species are readily distinguished from one another by the characteristics of their leaves.

Metrosideros kermadecensis, from the Kermadec Islands north of New Zealand, has recently become naturalized on Maui and may become a pest species. Several cultivars of M. excelsa, the pōhutukawa tree of New Zealand, have been sometimes planted as ornamentals in Hawaiʻi but are not reported to have naturalized. Metrosideros polymorpha was originally classified as a variety of M. collina, native to Rarotonga, Tahiti, and other islands of Polynesia, but now is generally accepted as a distinct Hawaiian endemic species.

== Etymology ==
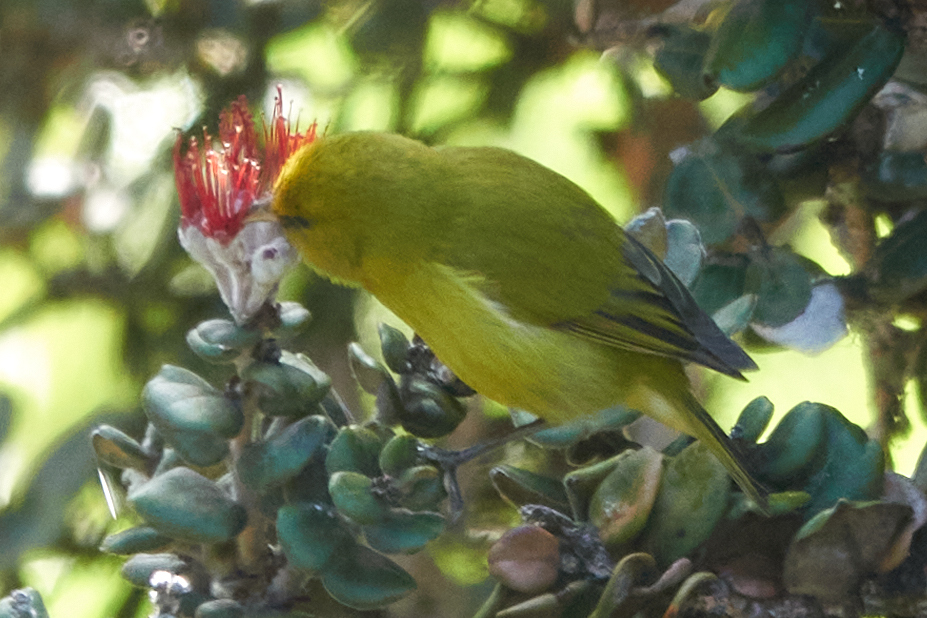
Maui ʻamakihi drinking nectar

It is a common misconception that the word ʻōhiʻa is used to refer to the tree and that the word lehua refers only to its flowers. The Hawaiian Dictionary describes lehua with these words:

The flower of the ʻōhiʻa tree ... also the tree itself. [emphasis added]

Thus endorsing the common practice of referring to Metrosideros polymorpha as a lehua tree, or as an ʻōhiʻa lehua, or simply an ʻōhiʻa.

The genus name Metrosideros is derived from the Greek words metra, meaning 'heartwood', and sideron, meaning 'iron', and refers to the hard wood of the trees in this genus. The specific epithet polymorpha, meaning 'many forms', is very appropriate, since individuals of this species exhibit many different morphologies and inhabit a broad range of ecological situations. The Hawaiian language word ʻōhiʻa is thought to have been derived from the ancestral Proto-Oceanic word, *kafika. Throughout Oceania, there are many similar-sounding words that were also derived from the same ancestral protoform and, in most cases, they are names for the "mountain apple", or "Malay apple" tree, Syzygium malaccense. In the Hawaiian Islands, however, the word ʻōhiʻa is not only used to refer to Syzygium malaccense, but also to other species of Syzygium and Metrosideros that occur there.

The derivation of the word lehua is more obscure, and while there are many opinions regarding its origin, there has been, to date, no historical linguistic study of the word to provide convincing evidence for any particular etymology.

== Distribution and habitat ==
Metrosideros polymorpha is the most common native tree in the Hawaiian Islands, tolerating a wide range of soil conditions, temperature, and rainfall. It grows from sea level right up to the tree line at elevations of 2,500 m (8,200 ft) and is commonly found in moist and dry forests, high shrublands, and is a colonizer of recent lava flows. Dominant in cloud forests above 400 m (1,300 ft), the tree is also common in seasonally wet forests, where it may be dominant or form mixtures with the native Acacia koa.

Preferred soils are acidic to neutral (pH 3.6–7.4) and either a Histosol, Mollisol, Podsol, Oxisol, Ultisol, or Alfisol. Rainfall of 1,000–3,000 mm (39–118 in) per year is favored, but ʻōhiʻa can grow in dry forests that receive as little as 400 mm (16 in) or bogs that get more than 10,000 mm (390 in) of rain.

On moist, deep soils, ʻōhiʻa grows to 20–25 m (66–82 ft) high. Trees growing in forests often have stilt roots, having germinated on logs or the stems of fallen hāpuʻu (Cibotium tree ferns), which have long decayed away when the tree has reached maturity. Some trees have fibrous aerial roots to gather moisture. At high elevations, and in areas with poor soils or little rainfall, shrub forms are the norm.

== Conservation ==
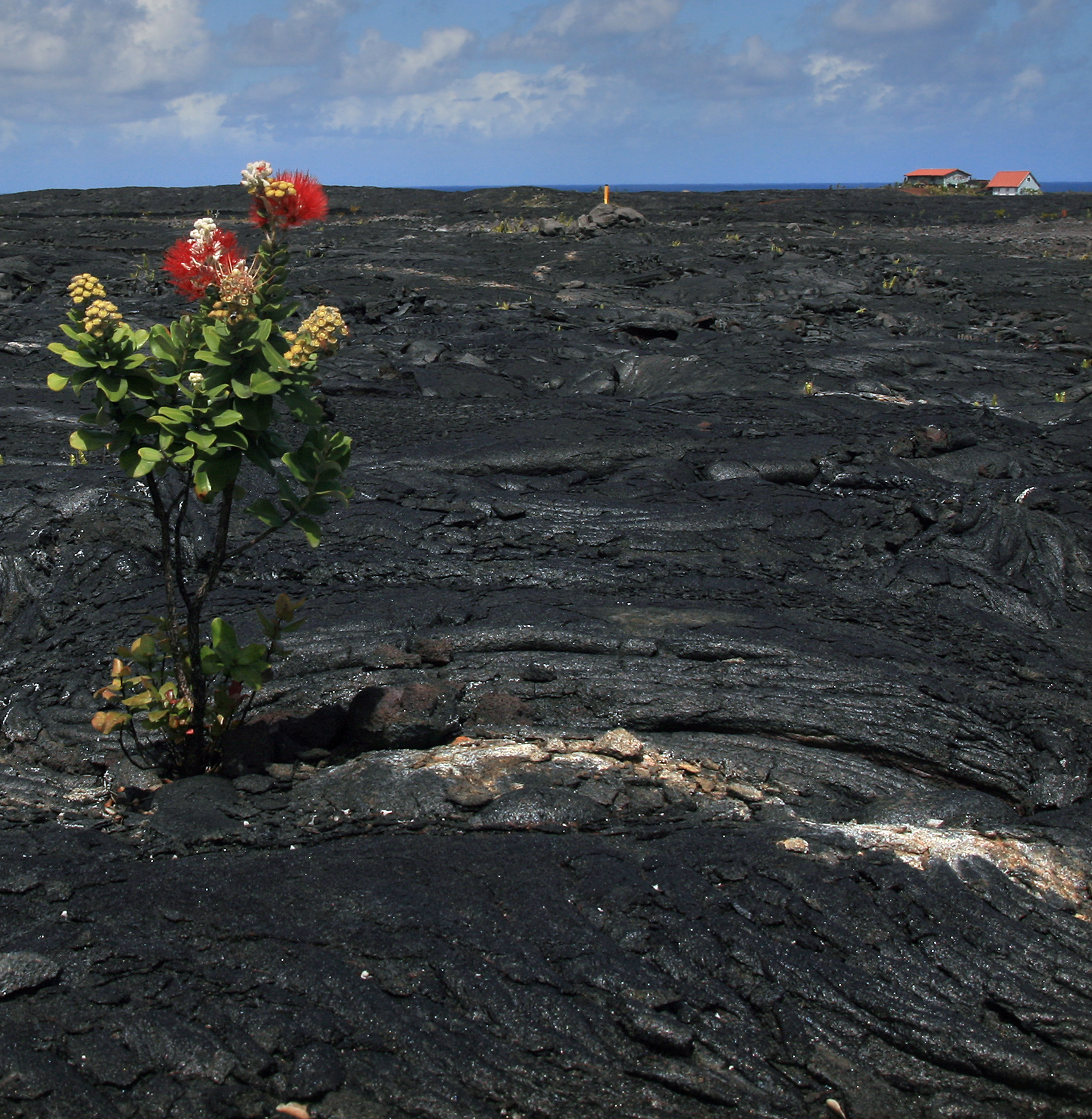
A specimen colonizing thirty-year-old pahoehoe flows from Kīlauea at Kalapana, Hawaii.

Metrosideros polymorpha forests in Hawaiʻi have been invaded by myriad alien species. In the wet forests these include the strawberry guava (Psidium cattleyanum), albizia (Falcataria falcata), and "purple plague" (Miconia calvescens). In drier areas, problematic invaders include faya tree (Myrica faya) and Christmasberry (Schinus terebinthifolia). Alien grasses such as meadow ricegrass (Microlaena stipoides) may form an understory that prevents or inhibits natural regeneration of the forests. In drier areas, M. polymorpha has to compete with silk oak (Grevillea robusta) and fountain grass (Cenchrus setaceus).

=== Rapid ʻōhiʻa death ===
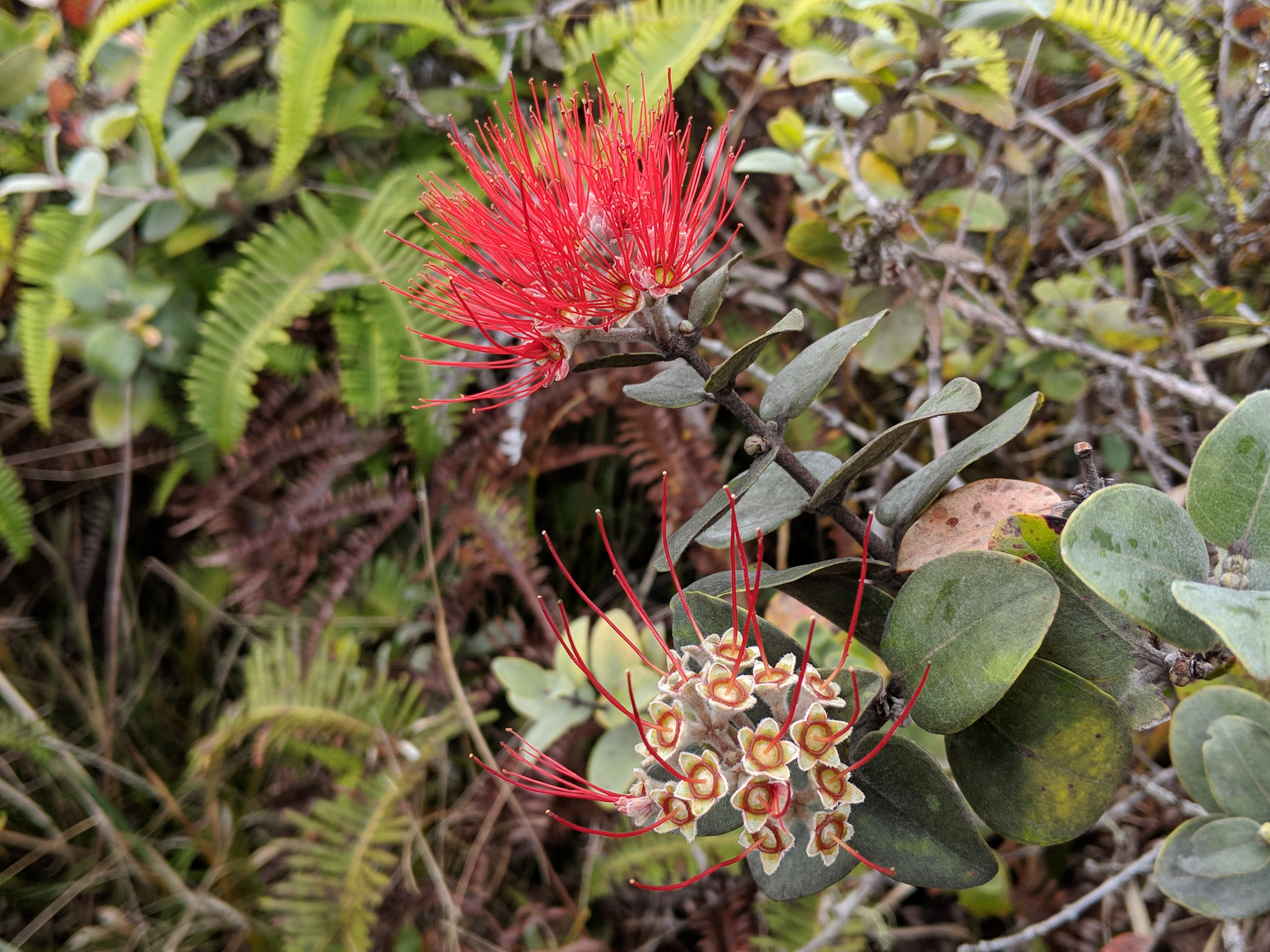
Flowering, Alaka'i swamp in Kaua'i

More recently, a strain of fungus initially identified as Ceratocystis fimbriata has attacked the ʻōhiʻa forests of the Big Island, causing rapid ʻōhiʻa death. The disease gets this name because healthy trees appear to die within a few days to a few weeks. While ʻōhiʻa itself remains extremely abundant, some species that depend on it such as the ʻAkekeʻe (Loxops caeruleirostris) and longhorn beetles in the genus Plagithmysus have become endangered due to forest areas shrinking.

In April 2018, the cause of rapid ʻōhiʻa death was identified as two species of Ceratocystis previously unknown to science: C. huliohia and C. lukuohia. By May 2018, infected ʻōhiʻa trees were found on the island of Kauai, prompting requests that members of the public limit transportation of ʻōhiʻa products within the island.

In 2022, to assist in slowing, and hopefully ending, Rapid ʻōhiʻa Death, the ʻōhiʻa became the state endemic tree of Hawaii thanks to a bill signed into law by Governor David Ige.

== Uses ==
The reddish brown heartwood of M. polymorpha is very hard, fine textured, and has a specific gravity of 0.7. In native Hawaiian society, it is used in house and heiau construction, as well as to make papa kuʻi ʻai (poi boards), weapons, tool handles, hohoa (round kapa beaters), and kiʻi (statues and idols). Although the trunk of ʻōhiʻa is not used to make the kaʻele (hull) of waʻa (outrigger canoes), it was used for their nohona waʻa (seats), pale (gunwales), and pola (decking). Wae (spreaders) were made from the curved stilt roots of ʻōhiʻa. Pā (fencing) was made from the wood due to its availability; kauila (Colubrina oppositifolia or Alphitonia ponderosa), more durable woods when in contact with soil, was rarer. As the wood burns hot and cleanly, it is excellent wahie (firewood). The lehua (flowers) and liko lehua (leaf buds) are used in making lei. The flowers were used medicinally to treat pain experienced during childbirth.

ʻŌhiʻa lehua is one of the few honey plants that is native to the Hawaiian Islands.

== In culture ==
In Hawaiian mythology, ʻŌhiʻa and Lehua were two young lovers. The volcano goddess Pele fell in love with the handsome ʻŌhiʻa and approached him, but he turned down her advances. In a fit of jealousy, Pele transformed ʻŌhiʻa into a tree. Lehua was devastated by this transformation and out of pity the other gods turned her into a flower and placed her upon the ʻōhiʻa tree. Other versions say that Pele felt remorseful but was unable to reverse the change, so she turned Lehua into a flower herself. It is said that when a lehua flower is plucked from an ʻōhiʻa tree, the sky will fill with rain representing the separated lovers' tears.

== Sources ==
- Medeiros, A.C.; Davenport, C.F.; Chimera, C.G. (14 April 2003). Auwahi: Ethnobotany of a Hawaiian Dryland Forest (PDF) (Report). Ethnobotany of Auwahi (published 28 October 2009).
- Simpson, P. (2005). Pōhutukawa & Rātā: New Zealand's iron-hearted trees. Te Papa Press.
- Starr, F.; Starr, K.; Loope, L.L. (27 July 2004). "New plant records from the Hawaiian Archipelago". In Evenhuis, Neal L.; Eldredge, Lucius G. (eds.). Records of the Hawaii Biological Survey for 2004 – Part 2 (Report). Bishop Museum Occasional Papers. Vol. 79. Honolulu, HI: Bishop Museum Press. pp. 20–30.
- Metrosideros polymorpha (ʻōhiʻa lehua) (PDF) (Report). Species Profiles for Pacific Island Agroforestry. April 2006. version 3.2.
