= List of species of the Northwestern Hawaiian Islands =

This is a list of the species that inhabit the Northwestern Hawaiian Islands. Except for researchers and volunteers living on Midway Atoll, Kure Atoll, and Tern Island, the leeward islands are uninhabited by people but home to at least 7000 species ranging from marine mammals, fish, sea turtles, birds and invertebrates. Many of these species are rare or endangered and at least 25% are endemic to the Northwestern Hawaiian Islands. This list identifies which islands the species lives on, and whether the species is endemic to the NWHI.

== Animals ==
=== sea animals ===
	Nīhoa	Necker	French Frigate Shoals	Gardner Pinnacles	Laysan	Lisianski	Pearl and Hermes	Midway	Kure	Endemic?
Laysan albatross	✓	✓	✓	✓	✓	✓	✓	✓	✓	
Nīhoa finch	✓									Endemic
Blue noddy	✓	✓	✓	✓						
Nīhoa millerbird	✓									Endemic
Red-footed booby	✓	✓	✓	✓	✓	✓	✓	✓	✓	
Laysan finch					✓		✓			Endemic
Brown noddy	✓	✓	✓	✓	✓	✓	✓	✓	✓	
Laysan duck					✓			✓	✓	Endemic
Bristle-thighed curlew	✓	✓	✓	✓	✓	✓	✓	✓	✓	
Pacific golden plover	✓	✓	✓	✓	✓	✓	✓	✓	✓	
Grey-backed tern	✓	✓	✓	✓	✓	✓	✓	✓	✓	
Ruddy turnstone	✓	✓	✓	✓	✓	✓	✓	✓	✓	
Black-footed albatross	✓	✓	✓	✓	✓	✓	✓	✓	✓	
Great frigatebird	✓	✓	✓	✓	✓	✓	✓	✓	✓	
White tern	✓	✓	✓	✓	✓	✓		✓	✓	
Short-tailed albatross	✓	✓	✓	✓	✓	✓	✓	✓	✓	
Black noddy	✓	✓	✓	✓	✓	✓	✓	✓	✓	
Wedge-tailed shearwater	✓	✓	✓	✓	✓	✓	✓	✓	✓	
Brown booby	✓	✓	✓	✓	✓	✓	✓	✓	✓	
Christmas shearwater	✓		✓		✓	✓	✓	✓	✓	
Masked booby	✓	✓	✓	✓	✓	✓	✓	✓	✓	
Sooty tern	✓	✓	✓	✓	✓	✓	✓	✓	✓	
Bonin petrel	✓	✓	✓	✓	✓	✓	✓	✓	✓	

== Plants ==
	Nīhoa	Necker	French Frigate Shoals	Gardner Pinnacles	Laysan	Lisianski	Pearl and Hermes	Midway	Kure	Endemic?
Amaranthus brownii	✓									Endemic
Boerhavia repens					✓	✓	✓	✓	✓	
Chenopodium oahuense	✓	✓	✓		✓	✓				
Cyperus pennatiformis					✓					Endemic
Cyperus polystachyos	✓				✓			✓	✓	
Eragrostis paupera			✓				✓	✓	✓	
Eragrostis variabilis	✓				✓	✓	✓	✓	✓	
Fimbristylis cymosa			✓				✓	✓	✓	
Ipomoea indica	✓				✓			✓	✓	
Ipomoea pes-caprae	✓		✓		✓	✓	✓	✓	✓	
Portulaca lutea	✓	✓	✓	✓	✓	✓		✓		
Pritchardia remota	✓									Endemic
Pseudognaphalium sandwicensium								✓	✓	
Schiedea verticillata	✓									Endemic
Sesbania tomentosa	✓	✓								
Sesuvium portulacastrum		✓			✓	✓	✓			
Sicyos pachycarpus					✓	✓	✓		✓	
Solanum nelsonii	✓				✓		✓	✓	✓	
Tribulus cistoides	✓		✓		✓	✓	✓	✓	✓	
