= List of flora of Nīhoa =

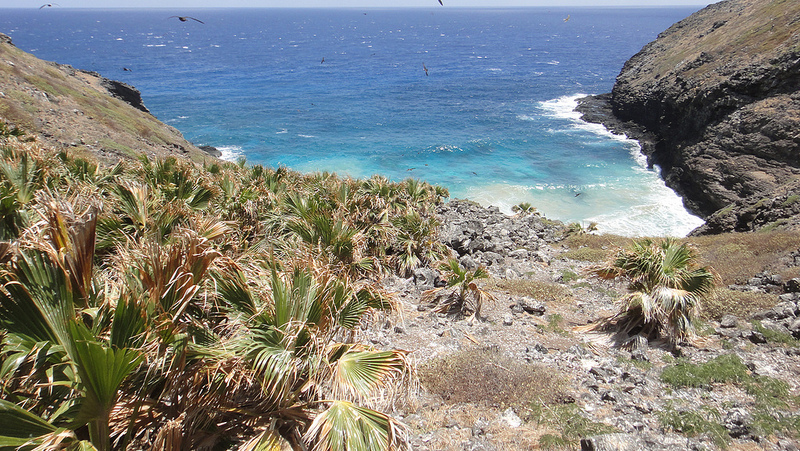
West Palm Valley, Nīhoa (Bird Island)

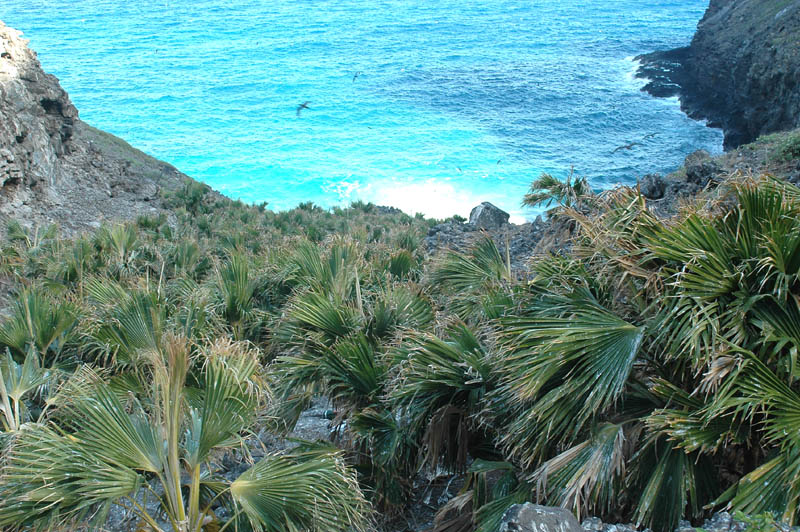
Nihoan fan palms

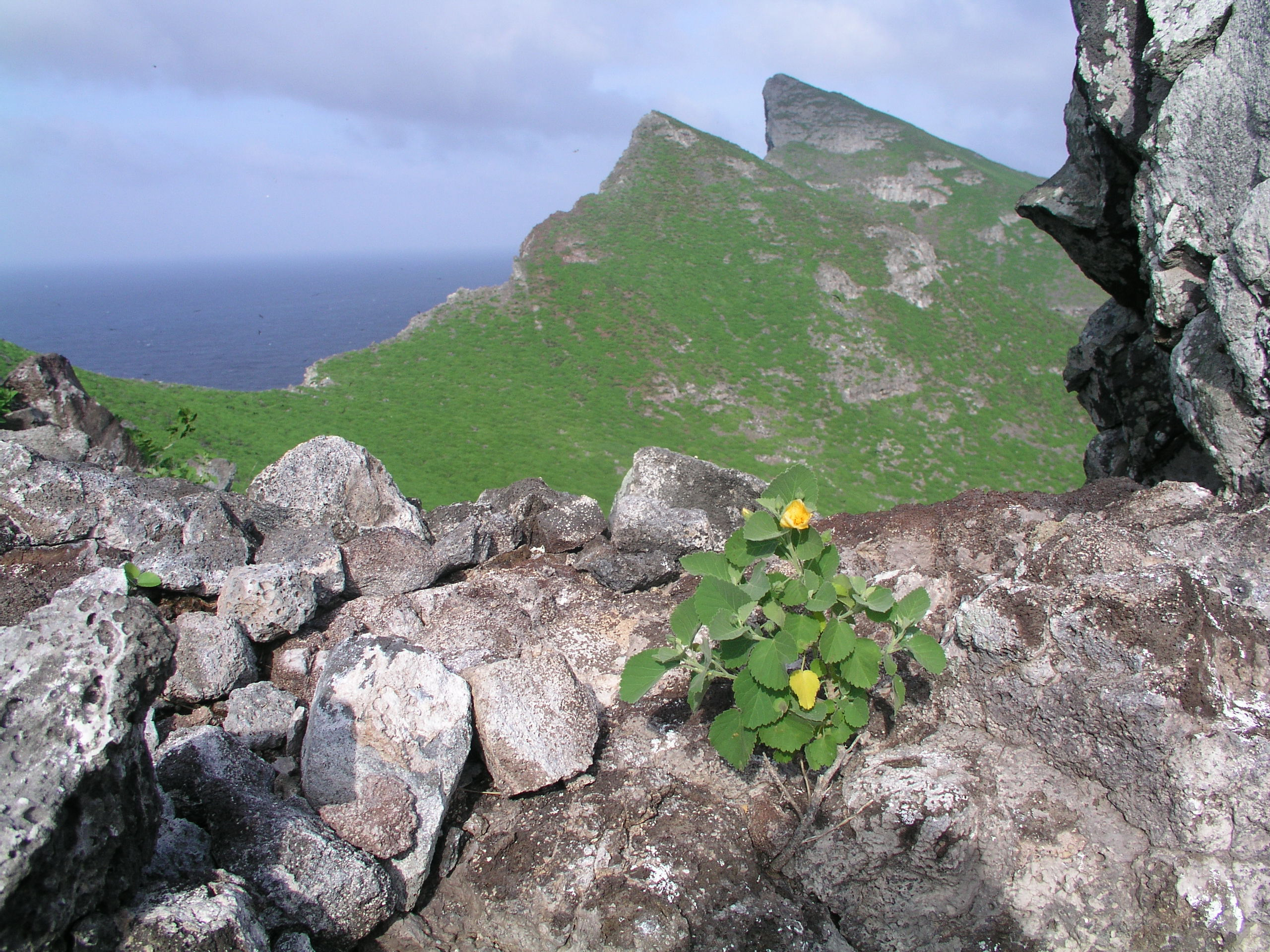
Sida fallax on Nīhoa (in foreground with yellow flowers)

This is a list of the flora of Nīhoa, an island in the Northwestern Hawaiian Islands, part of the City & County of Honolulu in the U.S. state of Hawaii. Nīhoa is listed in the National Register of Historic Places and protected under the Papahānaumokuākea Marine National Monument.

Species	Common name	Status
Nephrolepis multiflora	Sword fern	Naturalized alien
Pritchardia remota	Loulu	Endemic
Cenchrus echinatus	Sandbur	Naturalized alien
Eragrostis variabilis	ʻEmo-loa	Indigenous
Panicum torridum	Kākonakona	Indigenous
Paspalum sp.		Naturalized alien
Setaria verticillata	Bristly foxtail	Naturalized alien
Tetragonia tetragonoides	New Zealand spinach	Naturalized alien
Amaranthus brownii		Endemic
Heliotropium curassavicum	Nena	Indigenous
Schiedea verticillata	Nīhoa carnation	Endemic
Chenopodium oahuense	ʻAweoweo	Indigenous
Ipomoea indica	Koaliʻawahia	Indigenous
Ipomoea pes-caprae	Beach morning glory	Indigenous
Sicyos pachycarpus	ʻĀnunu	Indigenous
Euphorbia celastroides	ʻAkoko	Indigenous
Sesbania tomentosa	ʻOhai	Indigenous
Sida fallax	ʻIlima	Indigenous
Boerhavia repens	Alena	Indigenous
Rumex albescens	Huʻahuʻakō	Indigenous
Portulaca lutea	ʻIhi	Indigenous
Portulaca oleracea	Common purslane	Naturalized alien
Portulaca villosa	Hairy purslane, ʻIhi	Indigenous
Solanum americanum	Popolo	Indigenous
Solanum nelsonii		Indigenous
Tribulus cistoides	Nohu	Indigenous

== See also ==
- Hawaiian tropical low shrublands
- List of species of the Northwestern Hawaiian Islands
