= Northwestern Hawaii scrub =

Tropical savanna ecoregion of the Hawaiian Islands in the United States

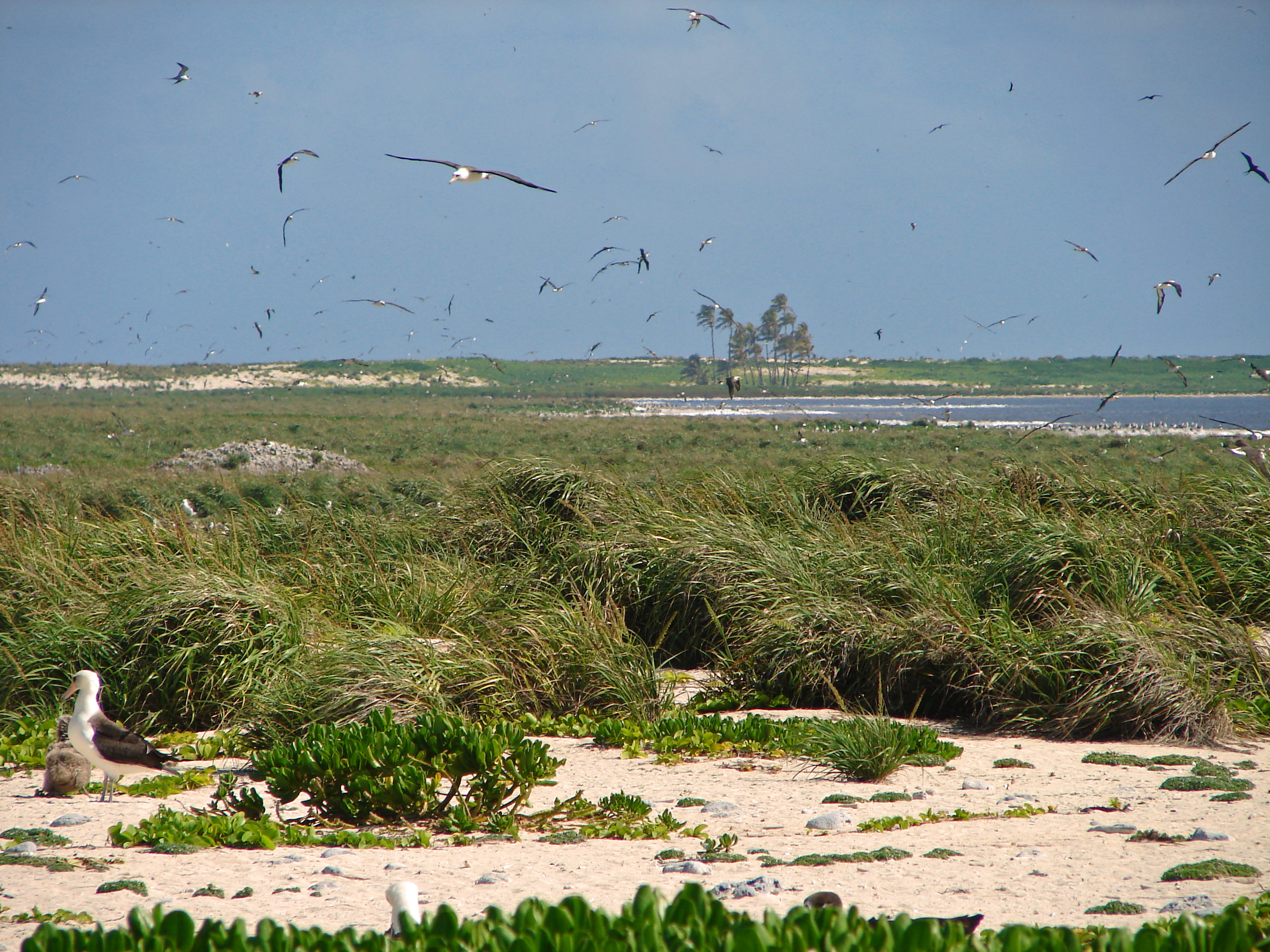
- Laysan Island

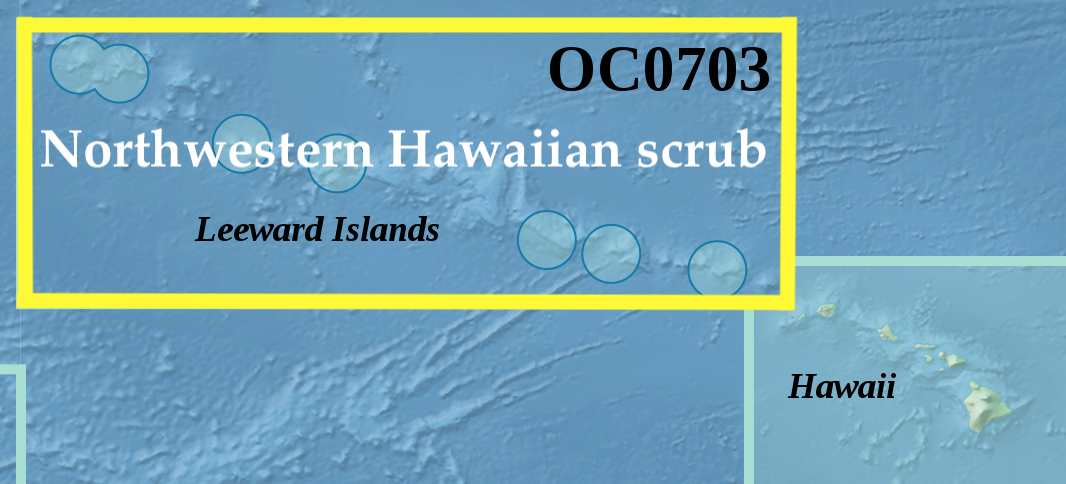
- Location of the ecoregion

Ecology
- Realm: Oceanian
- Biome: tropical and subtropical grasslands, savannas, and shrublands

Geography
- Area: 15 km^{2} (5.8 mi^{2})
- Country: United States
- States: Hawaii; Midway Atoll (territory)

Conservation
- Conservation status: Vulnerable
- Protected: 100%

The Northwestern Hawaii scrub is a tropical and subtropical grasslands, savannas, and shrublands ecoregion on the Northwestern Hawaiian Islands in the Pacific Ocean.

== Geography ==
The ecoregion covers the Northwestern Hawaiian Islands, a chain of low atolls and islets that extend 1350 kilometers northwest from the high volcanic islands of Hawaii. The atolls are the remnants of ancient volcanic islands created by the same geologic hotspot that created all the islands in the Hawaiian chain. As the movement of the Pacific Plate to the west-northwest carried the volcanic islands past the hotspot, volcanic activity ceased and the islands eroded and sank. Hard corals built up layers of coralline limestone to create a protecting barrier reef around the shallow lagoon where the central island used to be, and the action of wind, waves, and tides build small islands of coral sand.

Most of the ecoregion is in the state of Hawaii. Midway Atoll, near the northwestern end of the chain, is a territory of the United States.

== Flora ==
Five plant species are endemic to the ecoregion and listed as endangered. Three plants, the Nīhoa fan palm (Pritchardia remota), Schiedea verticillata, and Amaranthus brownii, are native to Nīhoa. The fan palm has been introduced to Laysan Island. Cyperus pennatiformis ssp. bryanii is known only from Laysan. Cenchrus agrimonioides var. laysanensis was historically known from Laysan Island, Midway Atoll and Kure Atoll, but has not been seen since about 1980 and may be extinct. The endangered Sesbania tomentosa or ‘ohai is native to Nīhoa, Necker, and the larger Hawaiian Islands.

== Fauna ==
The ecoregion is home to a distinct fauna, including the endangered Hawaiian monk seal (Neomonachus schauinslandi), three endemic species of birds – the Laysan duck (Anas laysanensis), Laysan finch (Telespiza cantans), and Nīhoa finch (Telespiza ultima) – and the Nīhoa millerbird (Acrocephalus familiaris kingi), an endemic subspecies.

The Northwestern Hawaiian Islands are an important feeding, nesting, and nursery habitat for seabirds, sea turtles, and cetaceans. 5.5 million seabirds nest in the islands every year, and 14 million seasonally reside there. It is collectively the largest tropical seabird rookery in the world. 99% of the world's Laysan albatross (Phoebastria immutabilis) and 98% of the world's black-footed albatross (Phoebastria nigripes) breed here.

== Protected areas ==
The entire ecoregion is in protected areas. Papahānaumokuākea Marine National Monument was created in 2006, and protects the islands and the surrounding oceans.
