= Amaranthus brownii =

Conservation status
- Extinct (IUCN 3.1)

Scientific classification
- Kingdom: Plantae
- Clade: Tracheophytes
- Clade: Angiosperms
- Clade: Eudicots
- Order: Caryophyllales
- Family: Amaranthaceae
- Genus: Amaranthus
- Species: †A. brownii

Binomial name
- †Amaranthus brownii Christoph. & Caum

Extinct species of flowering plant

Amaranthus brownii was an annual herb in the family Amaranthaceae. The plant was found only on the small island of Nīhoa in the Northwestern Hawaiian Islands, growing on rocky outcrops at altitudes of 120–215 m (394–705 ft). It was one of nine species of Amaranthus in the Hawaiian Islands, as well as the only endemic Hawaiian species of the genus. It is now considered extinct.

A. brownii was first discovered during the Tanager Expedition in 1923 by botanist Edward Leonard Caum. It differed from other Hawaiian species of Amaranthus with its spineless leaf axils, linear leaves, and indehiscent fruits. It was one of 26 vascular plants on Nīhoa, 17 of which are indigenous, six alien, and three endemic only to Nīhoa; these latter three included A. brownii, the Nīhoa fan palm or loulu, and the Nīhoa carnation. A. brownii was considered the rarest plant on Nīhoa and was not directly observed on the island after 1983. Past expeditions collected plant samples and seeds, but no specimens managed to survive ex situ conservation efforts outside of its native habitat. Consequently, there are no known plants or seeds from A. brownii in any botanical garden.

Conservation and recovery plans for A. brownii were proposed by the United States Fish and Wildlife Service (FWS), which administers the island of Nīhoa as part of the Hawaiian Islands National Wildlife Refuge in the Papahānaumokuākea Marine National Monument. In 1996, the plant was listed by the FWS as an endangered species. In 2003, the FWS designated the island of Nīhoa as a critical habitat for the plant and it was classified as critically endangered on the IUCN Red List. Following a lack of sightings for over 35 years despite intensive surveys, the species was classified as extinct on the IUCN Red List in 2018.

== Taxonomy ==
The species was first collected during a ten-day visit to the island of Nīhoa by the Tanager Expedition. Botanist Edward Leonard Caum collected the first specimen on June 17, 1923, and a second was collected by cartographer Charles S. Judd^{[b]} on June 20, 1923. Forest B. H. Brown, botanist of the Bayard Dominick Expedition to the Marquesas Islands (1921–1922), helped provide descriptions and comments for some of the species described by Erling Christophersen and Caum. They named A. brownii after Brown in 1931 with the publication of their paper "Vascular plants of the Leeward Islands, Hawaii". In the paper they originally described A. brownii as one of 20 vascular plant species on the island of Nīhoa. The FWS does not recognize a common name.

== Description ==
Amaranthus brownii was the only endemic species of Hawaiian Amaranthus in the Hawaiian Islands.^{[a]} It was an herbaceous annual plant that grows to a height of 30–90 cm (0.98–2.95 ft) and had narrow, linear leaves, small green flowers, and fruit that held a single, dark red seed. A. brownii was monoecious; that is, the male and female flowers were found together on the same plant. It differed from other Hawaiian species of Amaranthus with its spineless leaf axils, linear leaves, and indehiscent fruits (fruit which does not open to release seeds when ripe). The fruits were ovoid and between 0.8–1 mm long and 0.6–0.8 mm wide. The plant is thought to have been anemophilous (pollinated by wind).

== Distribution and habitat ==
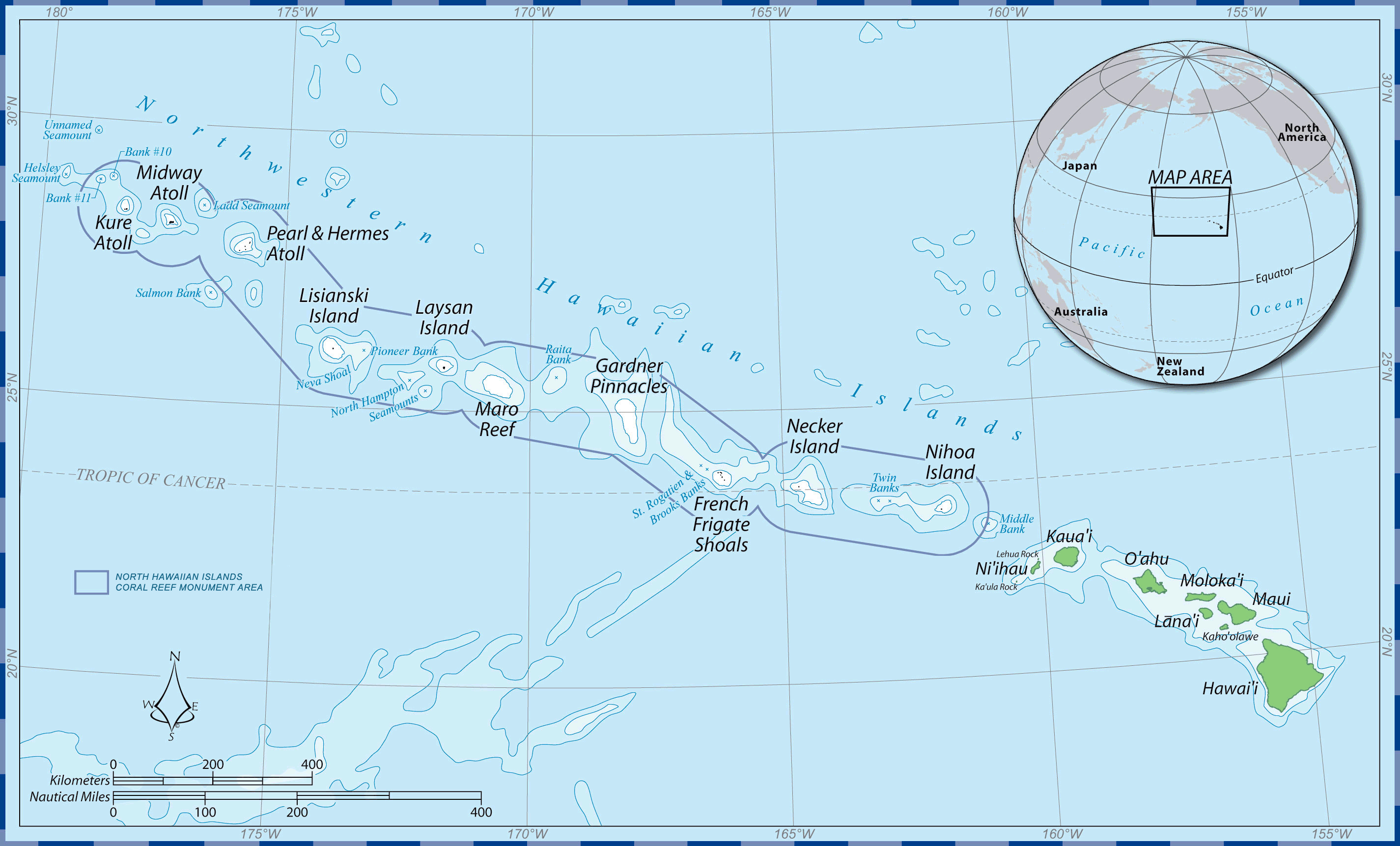
Papahānaumokuākea Marine National Monument

Amaranthus brownii had a very limited range; it was found only on the 0.65 km^{2} (0.25 sq mi) island of Nīhoa, located 275 km (171 mi) northwest of Kauai. It is thought that this endemic plant had probably always been rare and restricted to Nīhoa. Its former habitat is managed by the United States Fish and Wildlife Service and protected as part of the Hawaiian Islands National Wildlife Refuge in the Papahānaumokuākea Marine National Monument. A. brownii was one of three endemic and endangered species only found on Nīhoa, along with the Nīhoa fan palm (Pritchardia remota) and the Nīhoa carnation (Schiedea verticillata). At least nine other native plant species can be found in its habitat, including Hawaiian goosefoot (Chenopodium oahuense), lovegrass (Eragrostis variablis), koali ʻawa (Ipomoea indica), goat's foot (Ipomoea pes-caprae subsp. brasiliensis), Panicum torridum, naupaka (Scaevola sericea), Sicyos pachycarpus, ʻilima (Sida fallax), and Nelson's horsenettle (Solanum nelsonii).

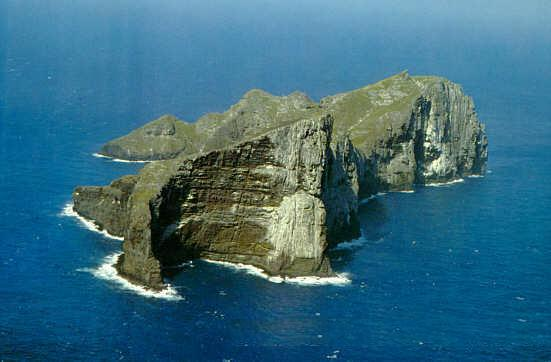
Aerial view of Nīhoa. In 1983, W. Gagné recorded 12 plant species growing on the island.

The plant grew during the moist, winter season from December through July in Nīhoa's coastal dry shrubland habitat in shallow soil on rocky outcrops in exposed areas between 120–215 m (394–705 ft). At the time of its discovery in 1923, botanists first observed the plant growing in great quantity on the ridges towards Miller Peak and on eastern ridges of the island. Expeditions in the early and mid-1960s failed to identify any specimens, but in 1969, ethnobotanist Douglas E. Yen of the Bishop Museum collected specimens near Miller Peak. Derral R. Herbst and Wayne Takeuchi of the FWS collected the last known specimen^{[c]} on July 27, 1980. Carl C. Christensen also visited Nīhoa in 1980 to reevaluate endemic species last observed on the Tanager Expedition. Sheila Conant and Mark S. Collins visited Nīhoa in 1980 as well; Conant returned twice in 1981, first with Mark J. Rauzon and later with Audrey L. Newman. In 1983, Conant visited the island with Wayne C. Gagné. Conant found A. brownii growing on the island in 1981 and 1983, by which time only two populations of 35 plants were thought to exist: 23 plants were found near Miller Peak and 12 plants in Middle Valley. The two plant populations were separated by a distance of approximately 0.4 km (0.25 mi).

Prehistoric Polynesian habitation on Nīhoa^{[d]} may have initially led to a decrease in the plant population of A. brownii. Major threats to the plant included invasive species, fire, and hybridization with other Amaranthus species. Inbreeding was a serious threat, as the small plant population must reproduce within its own circle resulting in genetic defects. A. brownii was also forced to compete with the non-native weed (Portulaca oleracea), the plant's main alien species threat. In 2002 and 2004, the invasive gray bird grasshopper (Schistocerca nitens) presented an even larger threat to A. brownii.^{[e]} First recorded on the island in 1977, the increasing population density of gray bird grasshoppers led to massive defoliation on the island, leaving A. brownii at greater risk of predation. In 2004 alone, an estimated 400,000 gray bird grasshoppers destroyed almost 90% of the vegetation on Nīhoa. All these threats may have contributed to its ultimate extinction.

== Conservation ==
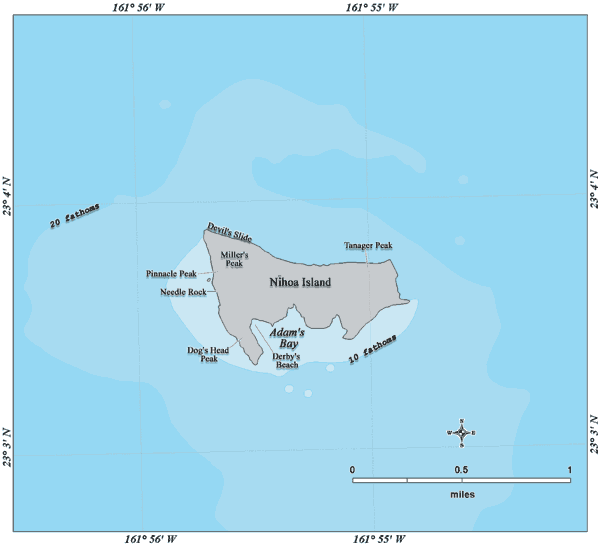
Plant populations were found on Miller's Ridge and on the west ridge of Middle Valley

According to zoologist and conservationist Sheila Conant, A. brownii was important due to its uniqueness in the Northwestern Hawaiian Islands as "the only Hawaiian endemic in this large genus which contains many economically and nutritionally important species." However, in more than a decade of field surveys on Nīhoa, no living plants were identified. Wildlife refuge staff visited the island during the dry season at least 21 times between 1983 and 1996. Originally, botanists thought the absence of the plant in field surveys might have been explained by the time of visits During the summer months, the stems of A. brownii dried up and could not be distinguished from other herbaceous plants. However, a seven-day visit to the island in April 2006 still did not find any specimens. Additional winter surveys were performed, but none were successful.

Ex situ conservation efforts to propagate A. brownii by seed in botanical gardens were also unsuccessful. During the 1981 expedition, A. bronwii seeds were collected by Sheila Conant and presented to the Waimea Arboretum on the Hawaiian island of Oahu and the Kew Gardens in London, England. Although the seeds at the Waimea Arboretum germinated and grew for a while, no plants survived beyond the stage of seedling development. Information about the outcome of the seeds sent to Kew Gardens is unavailable.

A proposal for listing A. brownii under the U.S. Endangered Species Act was originally submitted on June 16, 1976, but was withdrawn on December 10, 1979, as out of date and incomplete. It was proposed again on March 24, 1993, and was federally listed as an endangered species on August 21, 1996. On May 22, 2003, the FWS designated 171 acres (69 ha) on the island of Nīhoa as a critical habitat for A. brownii, as well as Pritchardia remota, Schiedea verticillata, and two other species also found on Nīhoa and other Hawaiian islands, ʻohai (Sesbania tomentosa) and Mariscus pennatiformis. Also in 2003, A. brownii was internationally classified as critically endangered on the IUCN Red List. As of 2010, A. brownii was one of 51 Hawaiian plant species listed as endangered or threatened under the Endangered Species Act.

== Notes ==
a. Wagner and Herbst list five naturalized species of Amaranthus in Hawaii in addition to the endemic A. brownii. The authors note that the information may be both inaccurate and incomplete due to errors caused by a lost collection and lack of data. A. graecizans, A. retroflexus, and a third unknown species (possibly extinct or reclassified) have been proposed as additional naturalized candidates.

Species of Amaranthus found in the Hawaiian Islands:
Genus	Species	Common name	Status	Range
Amaranthus	A. brownii	none	Extinct	Nīhoa (end)
Amaranthus	A. dubius	Spleen amaranth	n/a	Kauai, Oahu, Lanai, Hawaii
Amaranthus	A. hybridus	Green amaranth	n/a	Oahu, Maui
Amaranthus	A. lividus	Purple amaranth	n/a	Kauai, Oahu, Maui, Hawaii
Amaranthus	A. spinosus	Spiny amaranth (pakai kuku)	n/a	Kure Atoll, Kauai, Oahu, Maui, Hawaii
Amaranthus	A. viridis	Slender amaranth (pakai, ʻaheahea, pakaikai, pakapakai)	n/a	Kure Atoll, Kaʻula, Kauai, Oahu, Lanai, Maui, Kahoolawe, Hawaii
A. brownii is one of 12 endemic flowering plant species in the family Amaranthaceae found in the Hawaiian Islands:
Genus	Species	Common name	Status	Range
Achyranthes	A. atollensis	Hawaiʻi chaff flower	Extinct	Kure Atoll, Midway Atoll, Pearl and Hermes Atoll, Laysan (ex.)
Achyranthes	A. mutica	Blunt chaff flower	Critically endangered	Kauai (ex.), Hawaii (island)
Achyranthes	A. splendens	Maui chaff flower	Vulnerable	Oahu, Molokai (ex.), Lanai, Maui
Amaranthus	A. brownii		Extinct	Nīhoa
Charpentiera	C. densiflora	Dense-flowered pāpala (pāpala)	Critically endangered	Kauai, Maui
Charpentiera	C. elliptica	Pāpala		Kauai
Charpentiera	C. obovata	Broadleaf pāpala (pāpala)		Kauai, Oahu, Molokai, Lanai, Maui, Hawaii (island)
Charpentiera	C. ovata	Koʻolau Range pāpala (pāpala)		Oahu, Molokai, Maui, Hawaii (island)
Charpentiera	C. tomentosa	Waiʻanae Range pāpala (pāpala)		Oahu, Molokai, Lanai, Maui, Hawaii (island)
Nototrichium	N. divaricatum	Nā Pali rockwort (kuluʻī)		Kauai
Nototrichium	N. humile	Kaʻala rockwort (kuluʻī)	Endangered	Oahu, East Maui
Nototrichium	N. sandwicense	Hawaiʻi rockwort (kuluʻī)		All eight southeastern Hawaiian Islands

b. Nihoa: fl, fr, June 20, 1923, C. S. Judd No. 2

c. Herbst & Takeuchi 6545; BISH. Also see the database record at the U.S. National Herbarium: Herbst, D.R.; Takeuchi, W. No. 6545; Collection Date: 27 Jul 1980; Hawaiian Islands, Nihoa, Middle Valley. Alt. 91 m.; Barcode: 00453038 USNM No.: 02921853.

d. According to Mark J. Rauzon, anthropologist Kenneth Emory, a member of the Tanager Expedition, identified 66 archaeological sites on the island of Nīhoa, and to date 86 sites have been found. Emory estimated that 7.7 percent of the island (12 out of 156 acres) was used for terraced, dry-land crop production, and along with fish and seafowl, Emory believed 100 people (or more) could have survived on a long-term basis. However, questions about good potable water sources and the fact that only six skeletons have been found cast doubt on this figure.

e. Compare the destruction of vegetation on Nīhoa in 2004 to that of Laysan island. In 1894, Max Schlemmer introduced rabbits to Laysan. Eventually, the rabbit problem and bird poaching led U.S. President Theodore Roosevelt to declare the Northwestern Hawaiian Islands a bird sanctuary in 1909. By 1918, 26 plant species had disappeared from the island and the Laysan millerbird had become extinct. The Tanager Expedition arrived in 1923 and exterminated the last of the surviving rabbits.
