= Edward Leonard Caum =

American forester and botanist (1893–1952)

Edward Leonard Caum (1893–1952) was a United States botanist known for his work on plant species in Hawaii.

In the 1920s, Caum was working with the Hawaiian Sugar Planters' Association (HSPA), and with the help of W. W. G. Moir of American Factors, the two helped preserve a collection of Native Hawaii sugarcane species, S. officinarum. Caum lived with his wife in the "H" house of the Lyon Arboretum until his death. The house is now the main headquarters of the Lyon Arboretum.

== See also ==
- Amaranthus brownii
