= Hylaeus perkinsianus =

Conservation status
- Critically Imperiled (NatureServe)

Scientific classification
- Kingdom: Animalia
- Phylum: Arthropoda
- Clade: Pancrustacea
- Class: Insecta
- Order: Hymenoptera
- Family: Colletidae
- Genus: Hylaeus
- Species: H. perkinsianus

Binomial name
- Hylaeus perkinsianus Timberlake (1926)

Species of bee

Hylaeus perkinsianus, commonly known as Perkin's yellow-faced bee, is a species of yellow-faced bee in the family Colletidae. It was described by Philip Hunter Timberlake in 1926, and named for Robert Cyril Layton Perkins. The species is entirely endemic to the island of Nīhoa, Hawaiian Islands, whose range covers most of the island. It is listed by the Center for Biological Diversity as Declining and Threatened.

It is described as being medium-sized with clear wings. The face of the male has yellow markings while the female's is simply black with no markings.
