= Necker Island (Hawaii) =

Small island in Hawaii

Coordinates: 23°34′30″N 164°42′01″W

- Necker Island Archeological District
- U.S. National Register of Historic Places
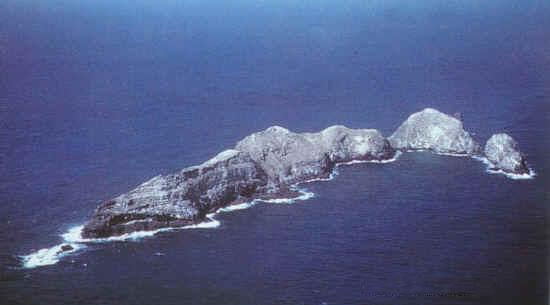
- An aerial view of Necker Island from the northeast.
- Nearest city: Puʻuwai, Niʻihau, Kauaʻi County, Hawaii
- Area: 45.193 acres (182,890 m^{2})
- NRHP reference No.: 88000641
- Added to NRHP: June 13, 1988

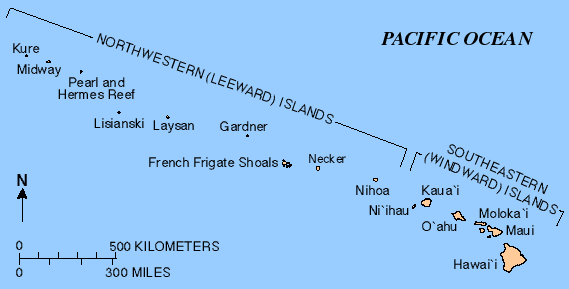
Map showing the location of Necker Island in the Hawaiian Island chain.

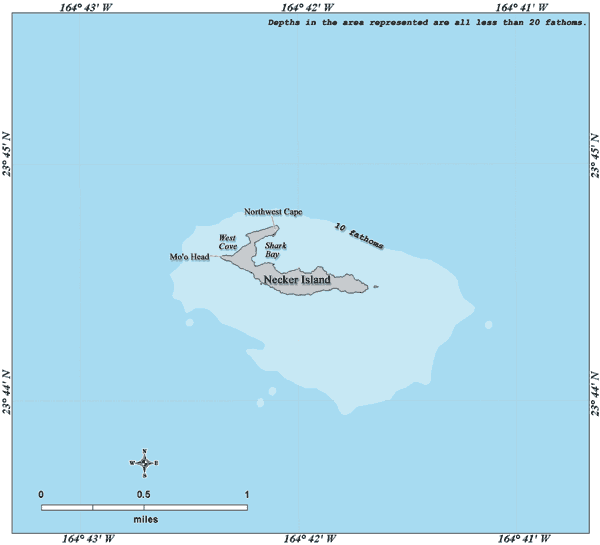
Map of Necker Island

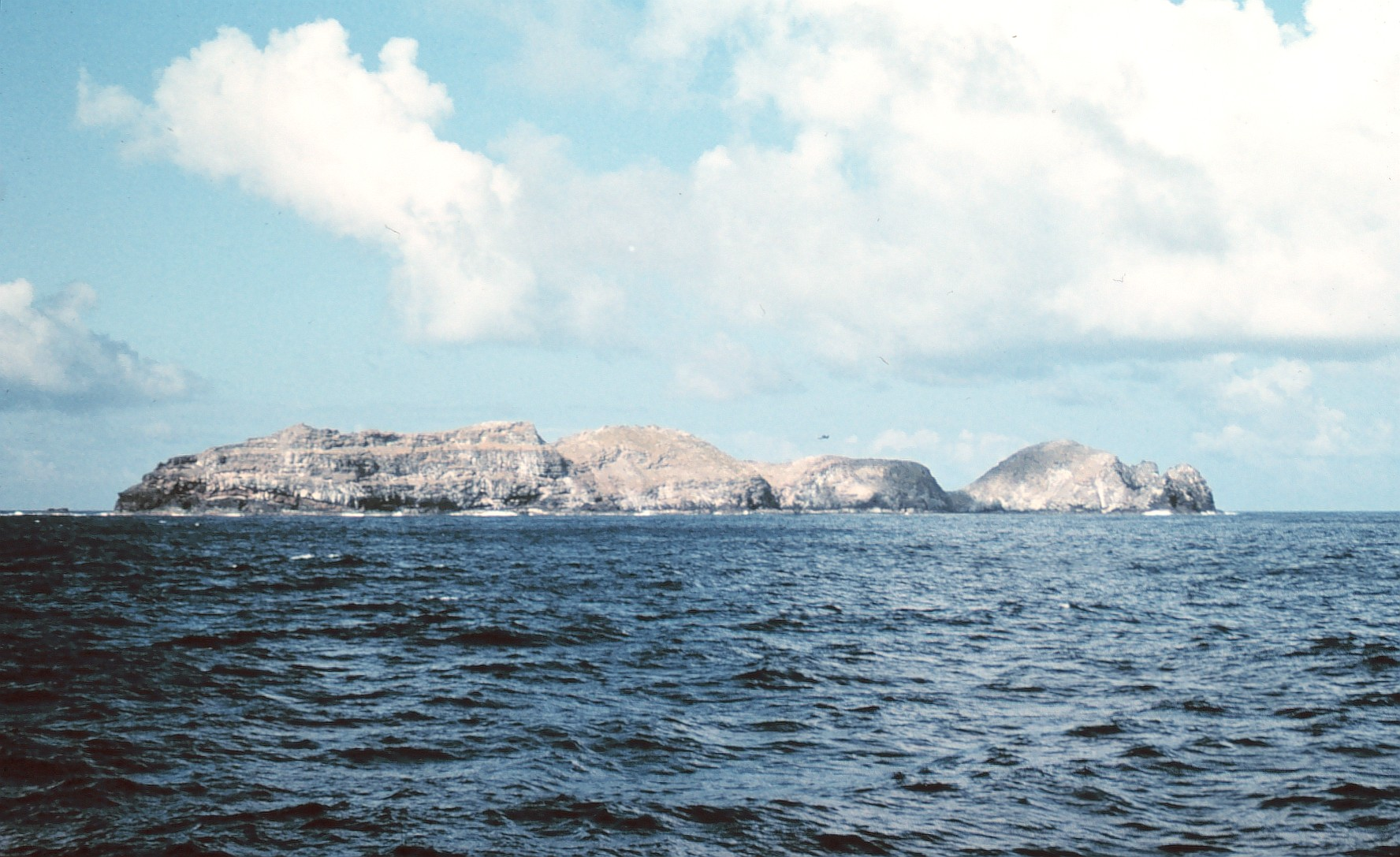
Necker Island in June 1969.

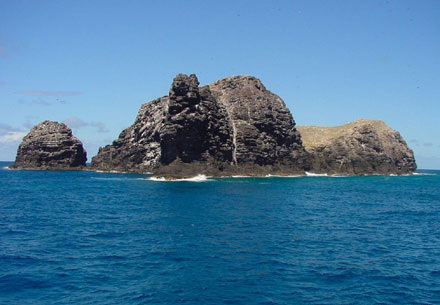
Moʻo Point (or Moʻo Head), the westernmost point of Necker Island.

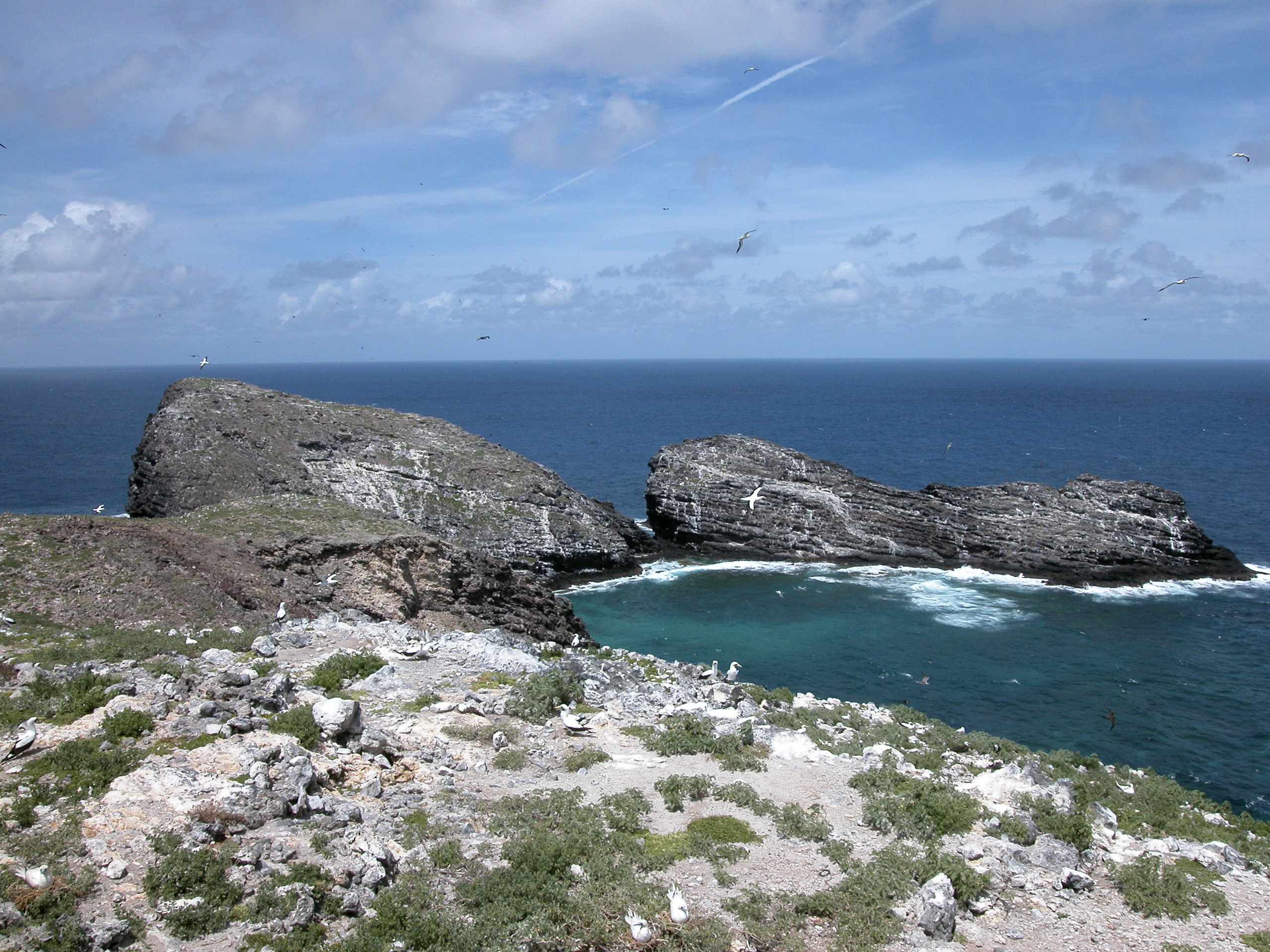
A view of Northwest Cape and Shark Bay from Necker Island's main ridge on 15 June 2006.

Necker Island (Hawaiian: Mokumanamana; lit. 'branched island') is a small uninhabited island in the Northwestern Hawaiian Islands. It is located in the Pacific Ocean, 430 miles (370 nmi; 690 km) northwest of Honolulu, Hawaii, 155 miles (135 nmi; 249 km) northwest of Nīhoa, and 8 miles (7 nmi; 13 km) north of the Tropic of Cancer. It is part of the state of Hawaii in the United States. It contains important prehistoric archaeological sites of the Hawaiian culture and is part of the Hawaiian Islands National Wildlife Refuge within the Papahānaumokuākea Marine National Monument.

The United States Census Bureau reports Necker Island's land area as 45.193 acres (18.289 ha). The island is rocky with steep sides and has very little soil. Its highest elevation is 277 feet (84 m). The island is named after Jacques Necker, a finance minister of Louis XVI.

== Name ==
The names Native Hawaiians in Ancient Hawaii used for the various Northwestern Hawaiian Islands have been lost. When the French explorer Jean-François de La Pérouse became the first European to sight the island in 1786, he named it "Necker Island" after Jacques Necker, a Genevan banker and statesman who served as finance minister for Louis XVI of France.

The Hawaiian Lexicon Committee was formed in Hawaii in 1987 to create new Hawaiian words for concepts and material culture unknown in Ancient Hawaii. Among its efforts have been the creation of Hawaiian names for geographical features bearing non-Hawaiian names (i.e., exonyms). Although the original Hawaiian name of Necker Island is unknown, ancient Hawaiian chants refer to a "branching island" or "pinnacled island" (mokumanamana). Among the Northwestern Hawaiian Islands, Necker Island best fits the physical description of a "branched or pinnacled island," and the committee therefore assigned it the Hawaiian name Mokumanamana on the assumption that the ancient chants referred to it.

== Administration ==
Politically, Necker Island is part of the City and County of Honolulu in the state of Hawaii. However, as part of the Hawaiian Islands National Wildlife Refuge, it is administered by the United States Fish and Wildlife Service. It has no resident human population.

== Geography ==
The remnant of a volcanic cone, Necker Island is located about 120 kilometers (65 nmi; 75 mi) southeast of the French Frigate Shoals on the northwestern end of a large, shallow ocean bank. It is a hook-shaped rocky ridge about 1.3 kilometers (0.8 mi) long and between 60 and 200 meters (197 and 656 ft) wide. Composed of basalt, the island is steep-sided and barren, with very little soil, and its rocks are heavily scoured and eroded. It is the second-smallest of the Northwestern Hawaiian Islands, with a total area of 45.193 acres (18.289 hectares) according to the United States Census Bureau. In separate documents, the United States Fish and Wildlife Service has claimed its area is 39.5 acres (16.0 hectares) and 41 acres (16.6 hectares).

The westernmost point on Necker Island is Moʻo Point (or Moʻo Head). The island's "hook" is Northwest Cape, a narrow spur that reaches a maximum height of 48 meters (156 ft) and juts northeastward from the west end of the island for 183 meters (600 ft). Northwest Cape is connected to the rest of the island by a narrow gap that is barely above sea level. Northwest Cape's tip is the northernmost point of the island.

The main ridge of the island and Northwest Cape combine to partially enclose Shark Bay (Hanakeaumoe) along the northern shore of the island; the bay opens to the northeast and usually is subject to rough seas. Along the island's western shore, West Cove lies between Moʻo Point and the southern end of Northwest Cape. A small islet, 300 feet (91 m) long and rising 10 feet (3 m) above sea level, lies just off Necker Island's eastern tip.

The main ridge of Necker Island has five peaks. East to west, they are:

- Siever's Peak, 61 meters (200 ft) high
- Bowl Hill (or Bryan Peak), 79 meters (259 ft) high
- Summit Hill (or Vaughn Peak), 84 meters (277 ft) high, the island's highest point
- Flagpole Hill, 56.4 meters (185 ft) high
- Annexation Peak (also Annexation Hill or Captain Brown Peak), 75 meters (247 ft) high

Bowl Cave is located on the northern slope of Bowl Hill. It is an important archaeological site.

Necker Island has an average annual rainfall of just under 25 inches (635 mm).

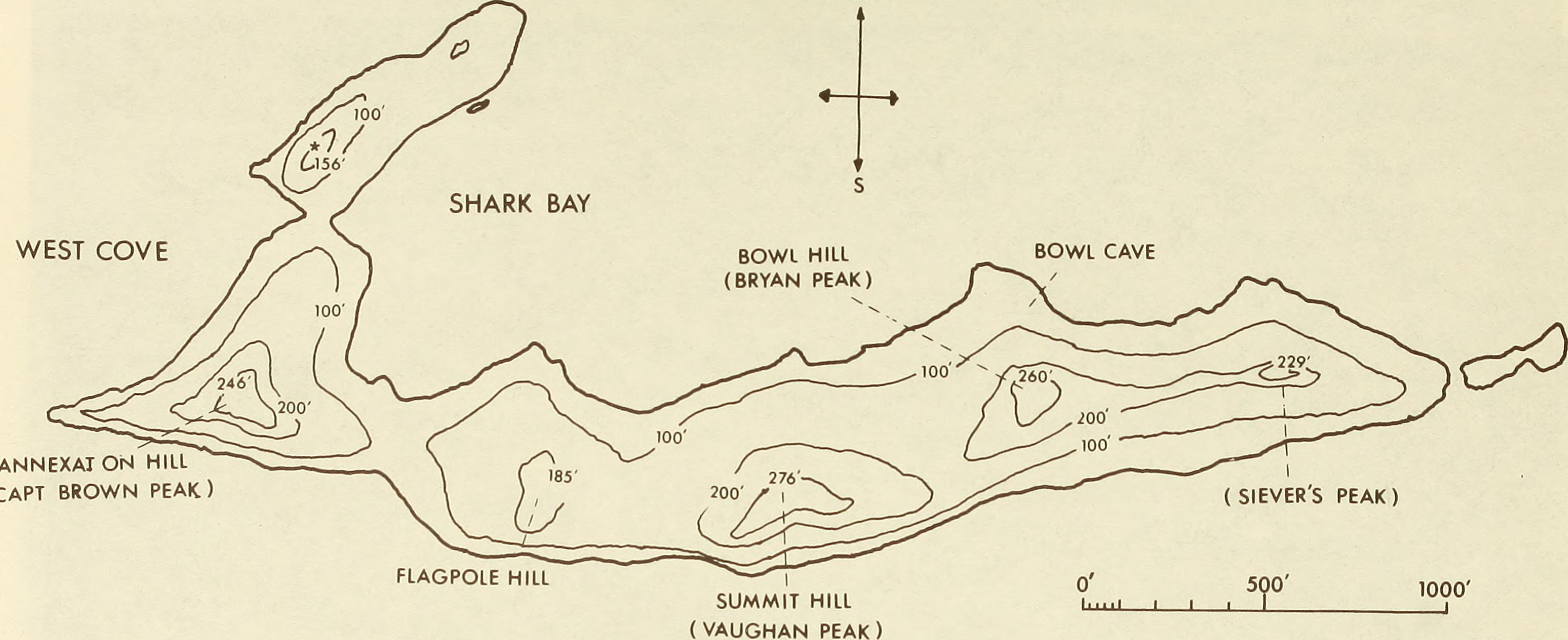

== Flora and fauna ==
Vegetation on Necker Island is limited to low shrubs and grasses, none more than 2 feet (0.6 m) tall. Five species of plants are known to occur:

- Goosefoot shrub (Chenopodium oahuense), found on the island's terraced slopes
- Bunch grass (Panicum torridum) (i.e., kakonakona), which grows on the north slope of the ridge
- Purslane (Portulaca lutea) (i.e., ihi weed), found on flat tops of the ridge
- Pickle weed (Sesuvium portulacastrum), a patch of which grows on the lower northeastern slope of Annexation Hill, where ocean spray from waves breaking in Shark Bay can reach it
- Ohai shrub (Sesbania tomentosa), which grows on the crest of the ridge

The forester of the Territory of Hawaii attempted to introduce six other species of plants to Necker Island in June 1923, but all had died out by the latter half of the 1930s, if not earlier.

The island is also noted for large numbers of birds. About 16 species of seabird nest on Necker Island; during nesting season, an estimated 60,000 birds nest on the island, and their eggs cover virtually every piece of level ground. A seabird first observed at Necker Island and at the French Frigate Shoals and Nīhoa in 1902 originally was thought to be new to science and was given the scientific name Procelsterna saxatalis and the popular name "Necker Island tern," but it later was identified as a subspecies of the blue-grey noddy, already known from farther south in the Pacific. No land birds live on the island. Land animals found on the island include land snails and 15 species of insect found nowhere else, as well as wolf spiders and bird ticks.

Although it is the second-smallest of the Northwestern Hawaiian Islands, Necker Island has the second-largest surrounding marine habitat among the islands, totaling 385,000 acres (156,000 ha), with Shark Bay, West Cove, Northwest Cape, and miles of shallow reef to the southeast of the island providing large offshore habitats. Runoff from the heavily eroded rock surfaces of the island and the constant wave action that scours its underwater basalt structure interfere with the growth of corals; little coral life exists in the shallow areas surrounding the island, and it lacks a fringing reef. However, 16 species of stony coral live in the area, and Necker is the easternmost island in the Hawaiian archipelago where table corals of the genus Acropora are found. Gray reef sharks and manta rays are common off the island, and Hawaiian monk seals populate its shores, some giving birth to pups there. Green sea turtles bask on the shore in the narrow gap between the main island and Northwest Cape, but they do not breed on Necker Island because the island lacks sandy beaches in which they could lay their eggs. A great abundance and diversity of sea cucumbers, sea urchins, and lobsters live in Shark Bay. Extensive deeper "shelves" extend many miles from the island's shallow reef, especially to the southeast, and commercial fishing takes place over these shelves, which produce much of Hawaii's catch of green jobfish, known locally as gray snapper or uku. Deep sea fish types that live hundreds of meters (yards) below the surface along the underwater slopes of Necker Island include fishes of the orders Stomiiformes, Gadiformes, Myctophiformes, and Aulopiformes.

== Archaeology ==
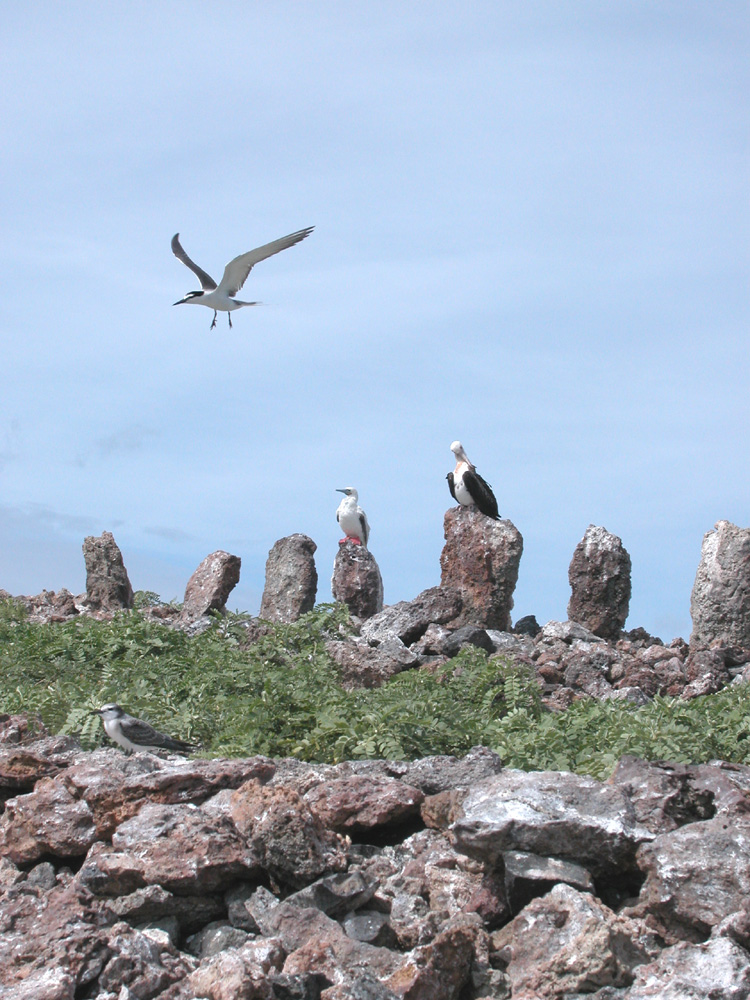
Standing stones of Necker Island

Necker Island is known for its numerous religious sites and cultural objects. There are few, if any, signs of long-term habitation, giving rise to the theory that people visited the island for short periods from other islands instead of settling permanently. Many anthropologists believe that the island was a ceremonial and religious site. Necker has 55 currently known sites including 33 ritual sites called heiau, while the remaining sites represent agricultural terraces, miscellaneous platforms, and shelter caves — of which Bowl Cave is the largest. Cultural sites on Necker Island are contemporaneous with those on Nīhoa and appear to have been abandoned at roughly the same time several centuries prior to European contact with the Hawaiian Islands.

The heiau on Necker Island and Nīhoa are unique in the Hawaiian chain, constructed as a raised pavement of basalt stones with upright stones placed across this pavement, often near the edges; this differs from the form common on other islands in the chain, where heiau were built as a high stacked stone wall enclosing a central space. This difference in form represents an earlier iteration of Hawaiian monumental architecture that offers a unique perspective on cultural norms prior to the abandonment of Necker. Thanks to this difference in form, scholars often use the Māori and Tahitian term marae as opposed to the Hawaiian term heiau in reference to these structures, and some scholars argue that the shift in form represents a shift in ritual practice in Hawaii.

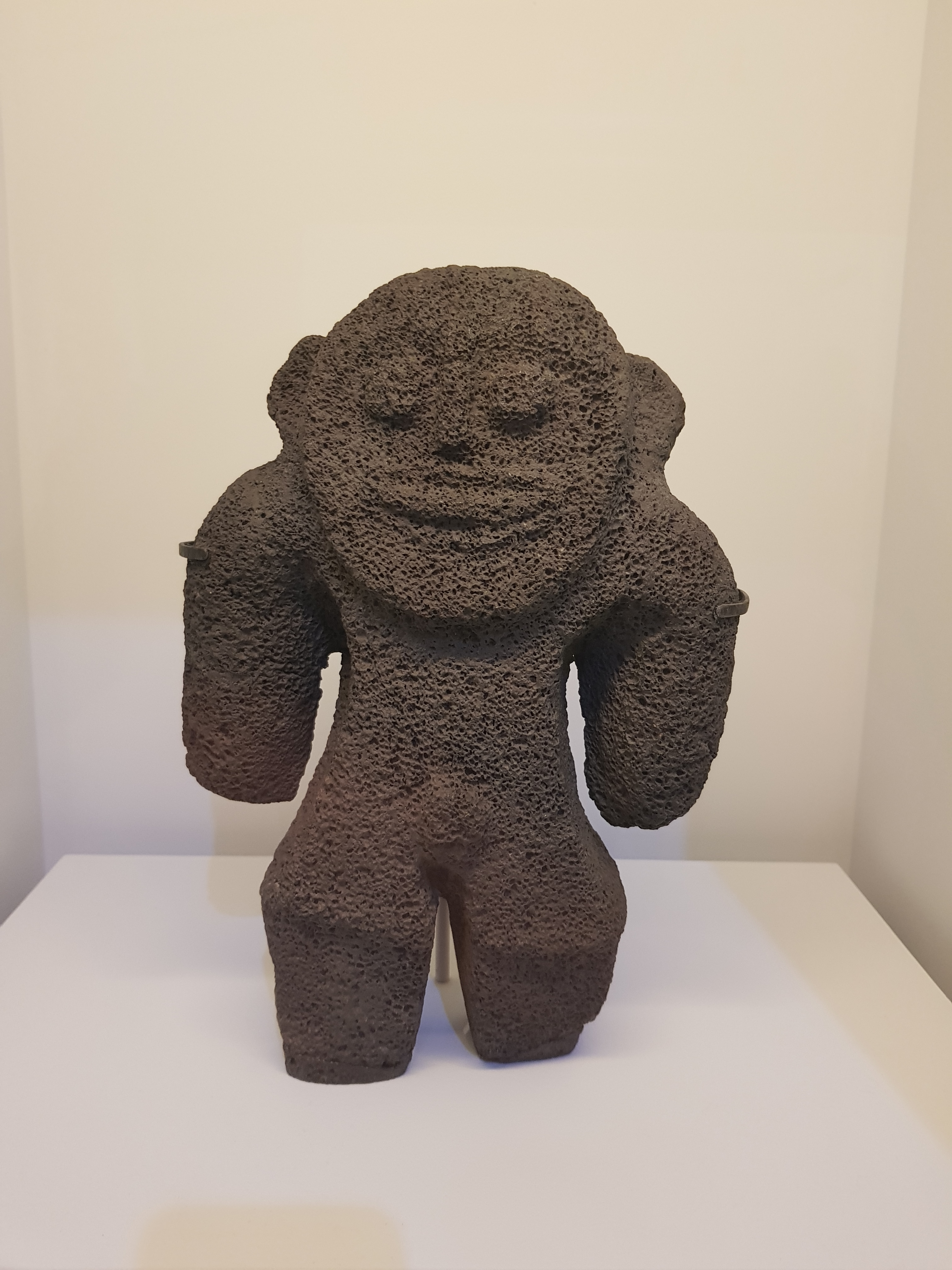
Basalt figure found on the island in the nineteenth century and now in the British Museum

Artifacts excavated on Necker Island show a remarkable number of items rendered in stone that elsewhere in Hawaii normally were made of wood. This is especially true of a series of remarkable carved stone bowls and a bird snare that would have required far more time and effort to create from stone. Additionally, archaeologists have recovered a series of human figures (kiʻi) from Necker Island carved from local stone in the vicinity of the ceremonial complexes. These statues are up to 1.5 feet (0.5 m) in length and differ in style and medium from similar sculptures usually rendered in wood recovered elsewhere in Hawaii. It is unknown what religious ceremonies these stone idols were associated with. They are now located in various museums around the world:

- five complete figures, 21 to 40 cm high, as well as two heads and a leg in the Bernice P. Bishop Museum in Honolulu
- two complete figures, 40 cm and 29 cm high, in the British Museum in London
- the head of a figure (24 cm) in the Metropolitan Museum of Art in New York City; the entire figure was probably 60 cm high.

In the cliffs, above the salt spray caused by the surf, there are shallow caves and rock overhangs. In some of them, the researchers found a number of everyday objects including adzes, chisels, fish and squid lures, hammer stones, awls, grindstones and other stone tools commonly found across the Hawaiian Islands. Demarcated cooking zones with ash residues prove that the caves were inhabited at times. Parts of human skeletons suggest that at least one cave also served as a burial site.

According to the oral traditions of the people of Kauai, which lies to the southeast, Necker Island was the last known refuge for a race of mythical "little people" called the Menehune. According to the legend, the Menehune settled on Necker Island after being chased off Kauai by the stronger Polynesians and subsequently built the various stone structures there.

== Gallery ==
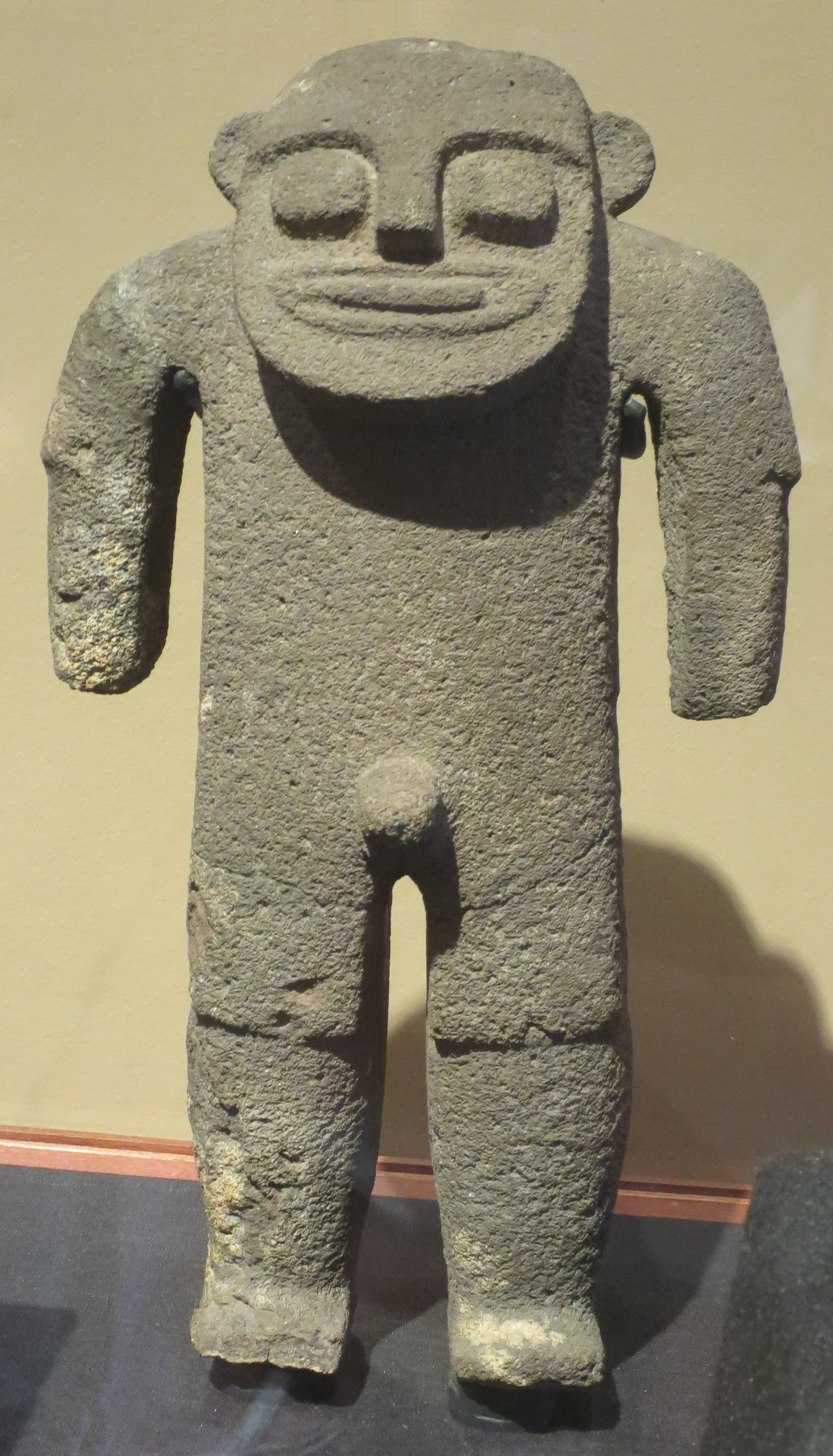
Figure in the Bishop Museum

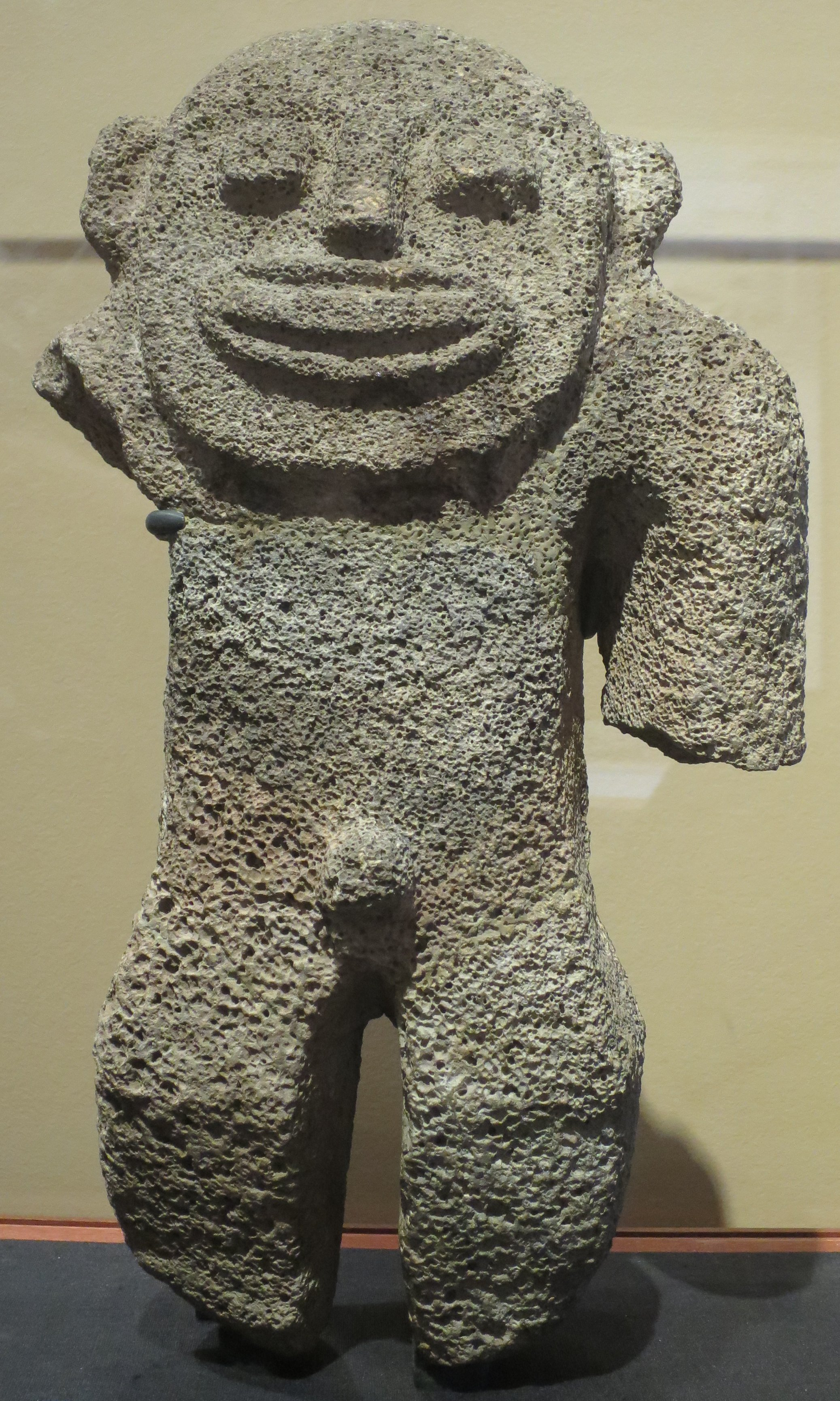
Another figure in the Bishop Museum

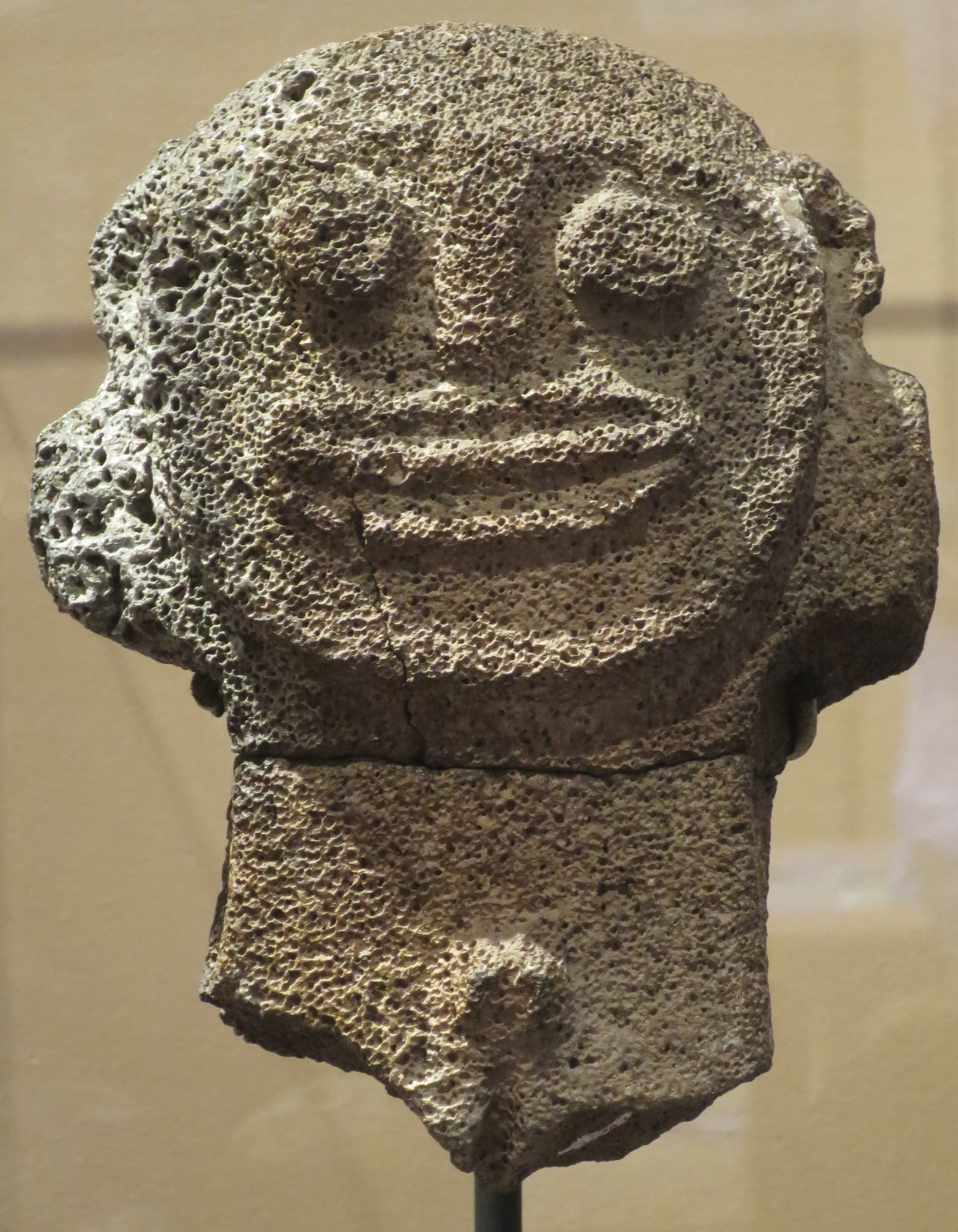
Head of a figure in the Metropolitan Musueum

== History ==
Geological research in the early 21st century indicates that Necker Island is about 10 million years old. While it rises only about 84 meters (277 ft) above sea level now, it reached 1,000 meters (3,281 ft) in height earlier in its history and at one time was comparable in size to modern Oahu.

Hawaiians appear to have started visiting Necker Island a few hundred years after they settled the main Hawaiian Islands. Archaeologists believe that the island's poor soil for farming and its small size and relative lack of rainfall made it uninhabitable, and that the Hawaiians visited from Nīhoa and other nearby islands to worship at religious sites without establishing any permanent settlements. Their visits appear to have ended a few hundred years before European contact, and by the time Europeans first visited Hawaii in the late eighteenth century, Necker Island apparently was unknown to the Hawaiians.

In 1785, the French explorer Jean-François de La Pérouse left France to circumnavigate the world on a mission of exploration for the French Academy of Sciences aboard the ships Astrolabe (under command of Fleuriot de Langle) and Boussole. The expedition had just discovered the French Frigate Shoals (Basse des Frégates Françaises) and La Pérouse's namesake rock, La Perouse Pinnacle, when on November 4, 1786, La Pérouse and his crews became the first Europeans to visit Necker Island. La Pérouse did not attempt to land on the island due to its nearly vertical sides and the violent seas breaking on its shore, but he sailed within a third of a league of it and named it after Jacques Necker, a Genevan banker and statesman who served as finance minister for Louis XVI of France. Although the expedition was lost at sea in 1788, it was able to send its logs home before its loss, bringing the island's existence to the attention of Europeans.

The first people to set foot on Necker Island in modern times appear to have been the British seaman John Turnbull of the ship Margaret, who visited the Hawaiian Islands between December 17, 1802, and January 21, 1803, and two Hawaiian pearl divers in his employ. The three men landed on the island during an expedition to find pearls on a reef in the Northwestern Hawaiian Islands.

Captain John or William Paty (sources disagree on Paty's first name) claimed Necker Island for the Kingdom of Hawaii in 1857, although he did not land on the island. The claim was disputed over the following decades. In January 1859, United States Navy Lieutenant J. M. Brook aboard the survey schooner USS Fenimore Cooper visited Necker Island and determined its position. During the summer of 1859, Captain N. C. Brook of the Hawaiian barque Gambia passed the island during a sealing and exploration voyage, but did not report landing on it.

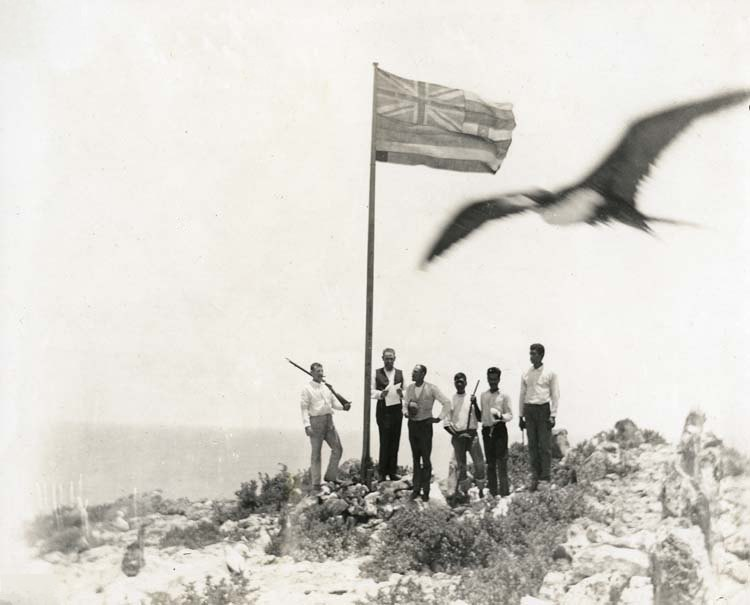
Ceremony for the annexation of Necker Island (Mokumanamana) by the Provisional Government of Hawaii, May 27, 1894.

As late as the early 1890s, the Kingdom of Hawaii's claim to Necker Island remained in dispute, and the United Kingdom was considering the island as a potential waypoint location for a submarine communications cable between Canada and Australia as part of the British Empire telegraph network known informally as the All Red Line. The Kingdom of Hawaii was overthrown in 1893 and replaced by the Provisional Government of Hawaii, and when the British corvette HMS Champion arrived at Honolulu in 1894, the provisional government's president, Sanford B. Dole, became concerned that the United Kingdom was about to establish a claim to Necker Island. Wishing to curry favor with the United States rather than the United Kingdom, Dole immediately dispatched an expedition under Captain James A. King to Necker to annex the island. On May 27, 1894, a landing party of 12 men led by King went ashore on Necker for four hours, raised the flag of Hawaii on what became known as Annexation Hill, and read an annexation proclamation. The move brought international disputes over claims to the island to an end and the island was included in the Republic of Hawaii when it was founded on July 4, 1894, although the British government continued to attempt to negotiate with the Hawaiian government over use of Necker Island and on September 24, 1894, Champion landed a British party on the island. On July 12, 1895, King led a Hawaiian government expedition — which also included the first director of the Bishop Museum, William Tufts Brigham, and Professor William DeWitt Alexander — to Necker to survey and map the island and conduct archaeological research. On August 12, 1898, the United States annexed the Hawaiian Islands, including Necker Island, and Necker was included in the Territory of Hawaii upon its creation on April 30, 1900.

In 1902, the United States Fish Commission research ship USFC Albatross visited Necker Island, and her personnel thought they discovered the "Necker Island tern" there, as well as on Nīhoa and at the French Frigate Shoals, during their visit; the bird later was determined to be a subspecies of the blue-grey noddy, already known from farther south in the Pacific. The island was leased for commercial fishing purposes for 21 years on June 2, 1904, and on February 3, 1909, it became part of the Hawaiian Islands Bird Reservation, managed jointly by the United States Department of Agriculture and the Territory of Hawaii.

George N. Wilcox visited Necker Island twice on unrecorded dates, and the United States Revenue Cutter Service revenue cutter USRC Thetis visited the island in 1910 and 1913, as did an expedition led by H. L. Tucker in 1917. The warden of the Hawaiian Islands Bird Reservation landed on the island on October 6, 1919, and found stone artifacts during his visit. The Tanager Expedition visited Necker Island in 1923 and 1924, and is noted for exploring the island's biology and archaeology; during its first visit, from June 12 to 29, 1923, it mapped the island and studied its flora and fauna in detail, and on its return visit from July 14 to July 17, 1924, it conducted a thorough archaeological survey.

On August 21, 1959, the State of Hawaii was created, and Necker was included in the new state. Because Native Hawaiians used Necker Island as a ceremonial and religious site in Ancient Hawaii, the United States government added the island to its National Register of Historic Places in 1988. In 1997, members of the Native Hawaiian organization Hui Mälama I Nä Kupuna O Hawaiʻi Nei ("Hawaiʻi Ancestral Care Association") visited the island to rebury human bones found there which had been transported to Honolulu and kept at Bishop Museum.

In the early 21st century, scientists studied benthic invertebrates and algal assemblages at Necker Island. On June 15, 2006, the United States established the Papahānaumokuākea Marine National Monument, with Necker Island within its boundaries.

== Access ==
Access to Necker Island is by boat, and is quite difficult because of the island's nearly vertical coastline. Heavy surf usually precludes landings along the coast in Shark Bay, but a small lee exists west of Northwest Cape, and landing on rocky shelves there is possible in moderately calm weather but can be dangerous in high surf.

Visits to Necker Island are permitted only for scientific, educational, and cultural purposes and require the approval of the United States Fish and Wildlife Service, which gives preference to scientific and cultural visits.

== See also ==
- List of volcanoes in the Hawaiian – Emperor seamount chain
- List of islands
- Desert island
- Necker Island (British Virgin Islands)
- Stonehenge (famous site with standing stones)
