= Nīhoa =

Island in Hawaii

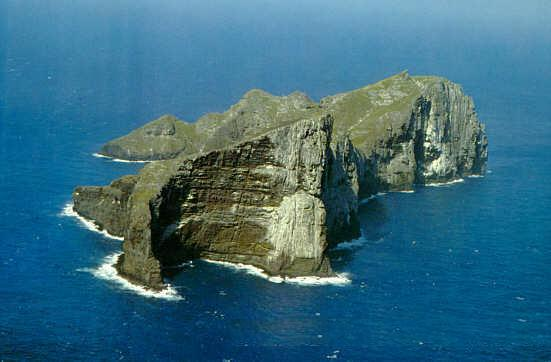

- Location within Pacific Ocean

Geography
- Location: Papahānaumokuākea Marine National Monument
- Coordinates: 23°03′38″N 161°55′19″W
- Archipelago: Northwestern Hawaiian Islands
- Area: 0.69 km^{2} (0.27 sq mi)

Administration
- United States

Demographics
- Population: 0

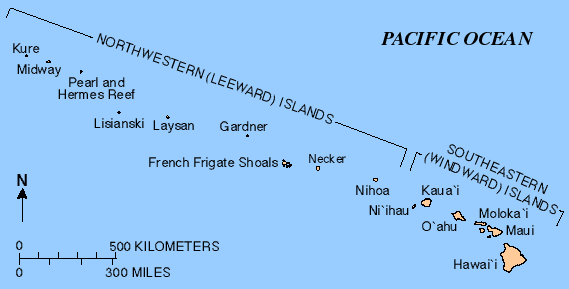
Map showing the location of Nīhoa in the Hawaiian island chain

Nīhoa, also written Nihoa and also known as Bird Island or Moku Manu, is the tallest of ten islands and atolls in the uninhabited Northwestern Hawaiian Islands (NWHI). The island is located at the southern end of the NWHI chain, 296 km (160 nmi) southeast of Necker Island. Nīhoa is the closest NWHI in proximity to the eight main windward Hawaiian Islands at approximately 240 km (130 nmi) northwest of the island of Kauaʻi. The island has two peaks, 272 m (892 ft) Miller's Peak in the west, and 259 m (850 ft) Tanager Peak in the east. Nīhoa's area is about 171 acres (0.69 km^{2}) and is surrounded by a 142,000-acre (57,000 ha) coral reef. Its jagged outline gives the island its name, from Hawaiian nīhoa "toothed, serrated".

The island is home to 25 species of plants and several animals, making it the most diverse island in the entirety of the NWHI. Endemic birds like the Nīhoa finch and Nīhoa millerbird, and endemic plants like Pritchardia remota and Schiedea verticillata are found only on Nīhoa. Amaranthus brownii was considered the rarest plant on Nīhoa and has not been directly observed on the island since 1983, and is now considered to be extinct. The plant communities and rocky outcrops provide nesting and perching areas for 18 species of seabirds, such as red-footed boobies and brown noddies, terns, shearwaters, and petrels. Prehistoric evidence indicates Native Hawaiians lived on or visited the island around AD 1000, but over time the location of Nīhoa was mostly forgotten, with only an oral legend preserving its name. Captain James Colnett rediscovered the island in 1788, and Queen Kaʻahumanu visited it in 1822. It was made part of the Kingdom of Hawaii by King Kamehameha IV.

In 1909, Nīhoa became part of the Hawaiian Islands Reservation, a federal wildlife refuge established by U.S. President Theodore Roosevelt. The Tanager Expedition surveyed the island in 1923, taking a comprehensive biological inventory of its many species. In 1940, it became part of the Northwestern Hawaiian Islands Wildlife Refuge and in 1988, it was listed on the National Register of Historic Places due to its culturally significant archaeological sites. In 2006, it became part of the Papahānaumokuākea Marine National Monument. Efforts are underway to ensure that endangered plant species are propagated beyond their limited range and represented in ex situ collections. Persons intending to visit Nīhoa for cultural and scientific research purposes require a USFWS-issued special-use permit to land on the island so as to reduce the risk of introducing alien species to Nīhoa's already fragile ecosystem.

== Geology and geography ==
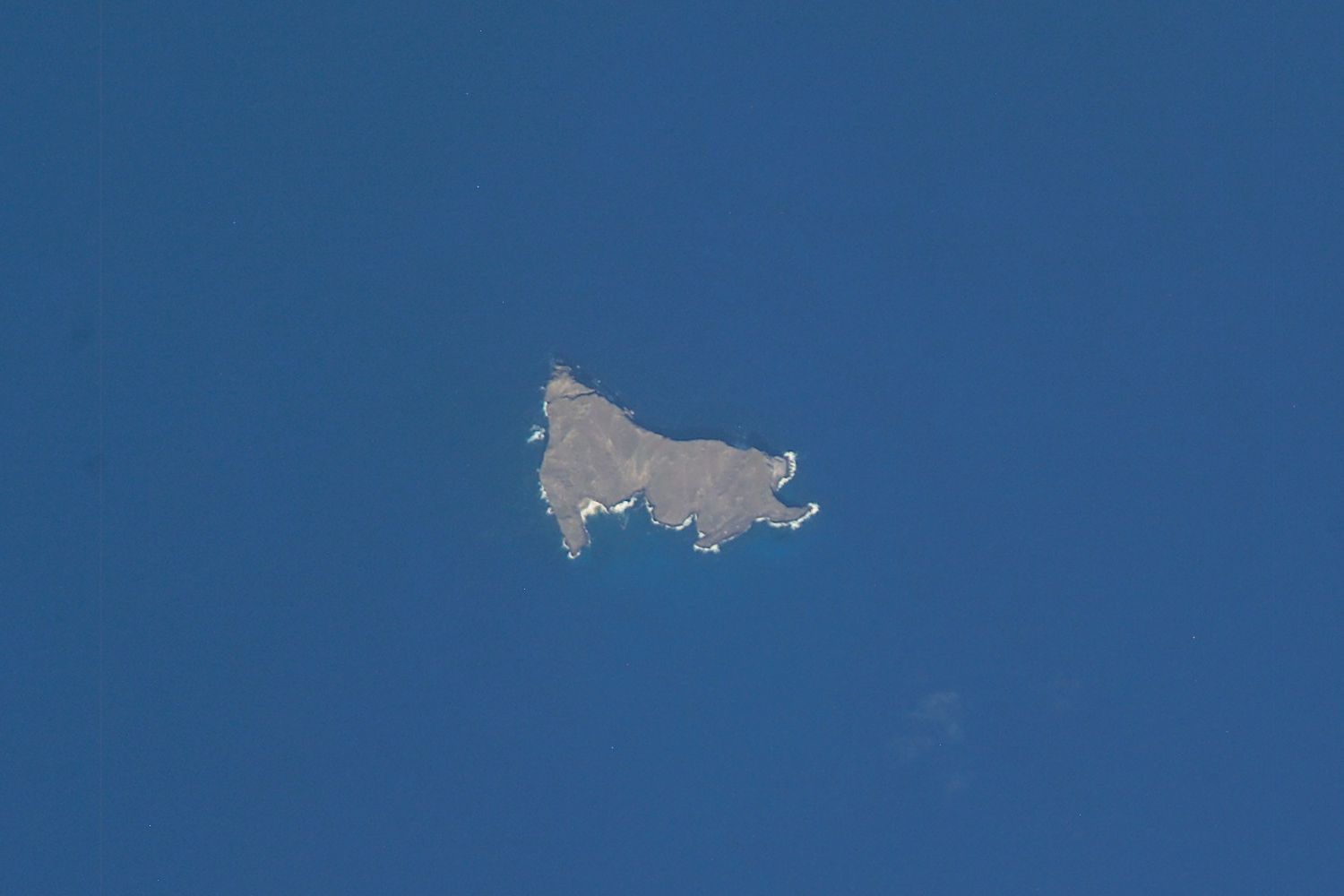
Nīhoa island, as seen from space

Nīhoa is part of the Hawaiian – Emperor seamount chain of volcanic islands, atolls, and seamounts starting from the island of Hawaiʻi in the southeast to the Aleutian Islands in the northwest. It is the youngest of ten islands in the uninhabited Northwestern Hawaiian Islands (NWHI), having formed 7.2 million years ago; the oldest, Kure Atoll, formed 30 million years ago. Over the millennia, Nīhoa has experienced significant erosion; along with Necker, French Frigate Shoals, and Gardner Pinnacles, Nīhoa is one of only four islands in the NWHI that still has an exposed basalt rock substrate. Six valleys slant down from north to south, meeting at the south side of the island: West Valley, West Palm Valley, Miller Valley, Middle Valley, East Palm Valley, and East Valley.

The valleys slant towards Adam's Bay (Hanakaʻieʻie) on the south side, which also has a sea cave.

Among features on Nīhoa are Dog's Head Peak (358 ft or 109 m), named for its likeness, and Pinnacle Peak (626 ft or 191 m), a volcanic dike created when less resilient rock was eroded away and harder rock was open to the elements. The only flat area on the island is Albatross Plateau, just below Miller's Peak. The Devil's Slide is a narrow cleft descending 700 feet (210 m) irrespective of the surrounding elevation. Extending northward from Albatross Plateau, it ends at the vertical cliffs with a 190-foot (60 m) drop straight down to the ocean below. In this chasm, rare ferns grow, along with several endemic species, including a giant cricket.

The island is about 1371 meters long going from east to west, and 274–914 meters wide. The overall shape is that of a half saddle, with one side having sheer cliffs and the other sloping towards the ocean.

== Ecology ==
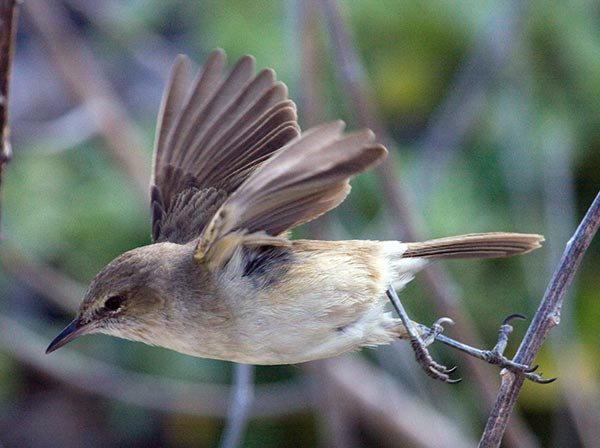
Nīhoa millerbird

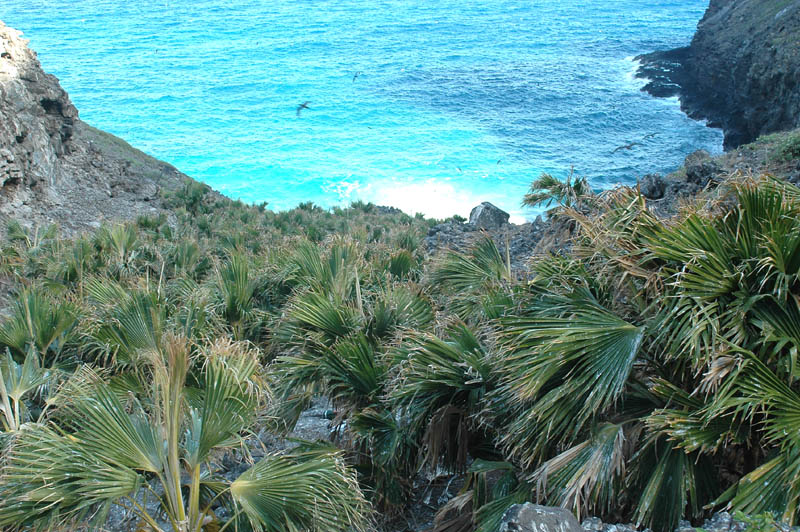
Nihoan fan palms

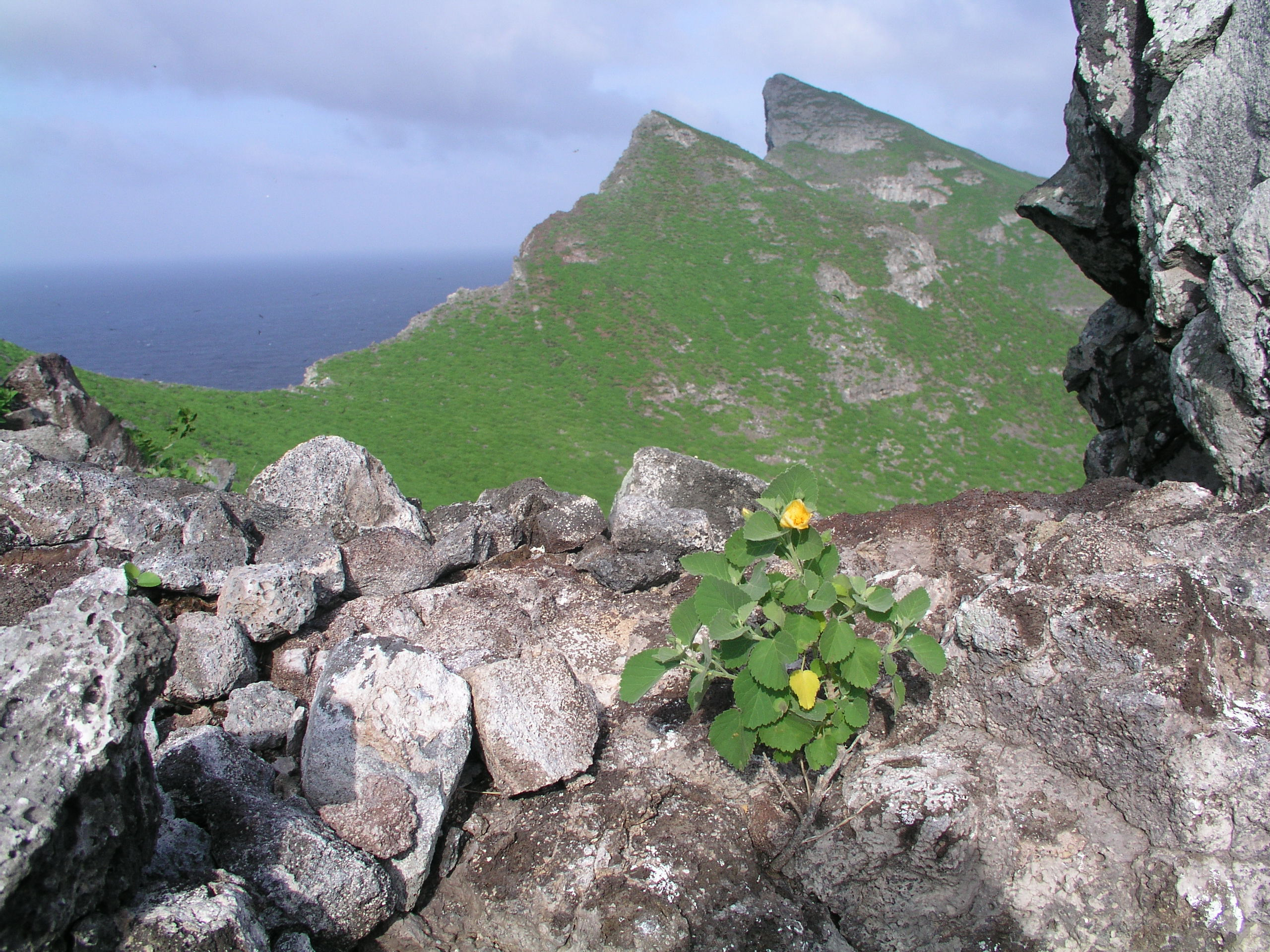
Sida fallax on Nīhoa

Nīhoa's inaccessibility and lack of major guano deposits made the island unattractive to humans, helping to preserve its endemic species from extinction. Because of Nīhoa's small size, most of its endemic organisms are endangered, as one single disaster, such as an island-wide fire or an introduction of invasive species, could wipe out the whole population. One such invasive species is the gray bird grasshopper, Schistocerca nitens; from the period between 1999 and 2003, grasshoppers devastated much of the vegetation on the island and posed a real threat to the continued health of plants on Nīhoa. The following year, the numbers decreased and the vegetation became lush again. The grasshoppers probably came to Nīhoa by way of wind from Kauaʻi.

The north side of the island's cliffs are mostly bare, but the sloping valleys are covered with a variety of grasses and shrubs. The two most common grasses on these slopes are Eragrosis Varabilis and Panicum torridum.

There is also a variety of scrubs and bushes on the island slopes, such as Chenopodium sandwicheum and ilima bushes (Sida fallax).

Unique species include:

- Pritchardia remota fan palm, the only tree on the island
- Nīhoa millerbird
- Nīhoa finch
- Nīhoa conehead katydid
- Nīhoa carnation
- Sesbania tomentosa
- the amaranth Amaranthus brownii
- the trapdoor spider Nihoa mahina
- Thaumatogryllus conanti, a giant cricket found in the Devil's Slide area
- Plagithmysus nihoae, a longhorned beetle
- Eupelmus nihoaensis, a wasp
- Hylaeus perkinsianus, Perkin's yellow-faced bee
- Endodonta christenseni, a land snail

=== Important Bird Area ===
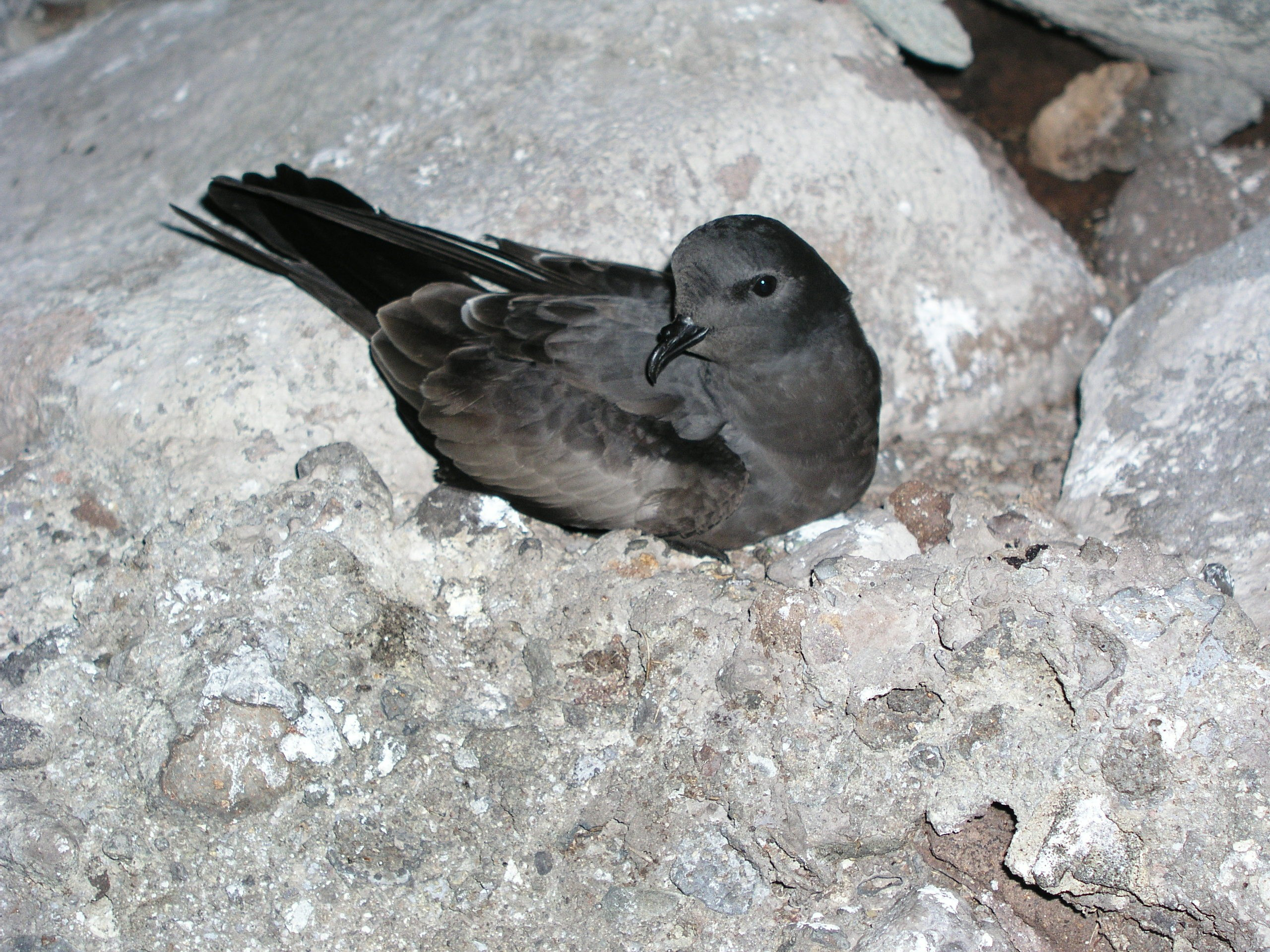
Tristram's storm petrel on Nīhoa

The island forms part of the Northwest Hawaiian Islands Important Bird Area (IBA), designated as such by BirdLife International because of its seabirds and endemic landbirds.

== Ancient history ==
- Nīhoa Island Archeological District
- U.S. National Register of Historic Places
- U.S. Historic district
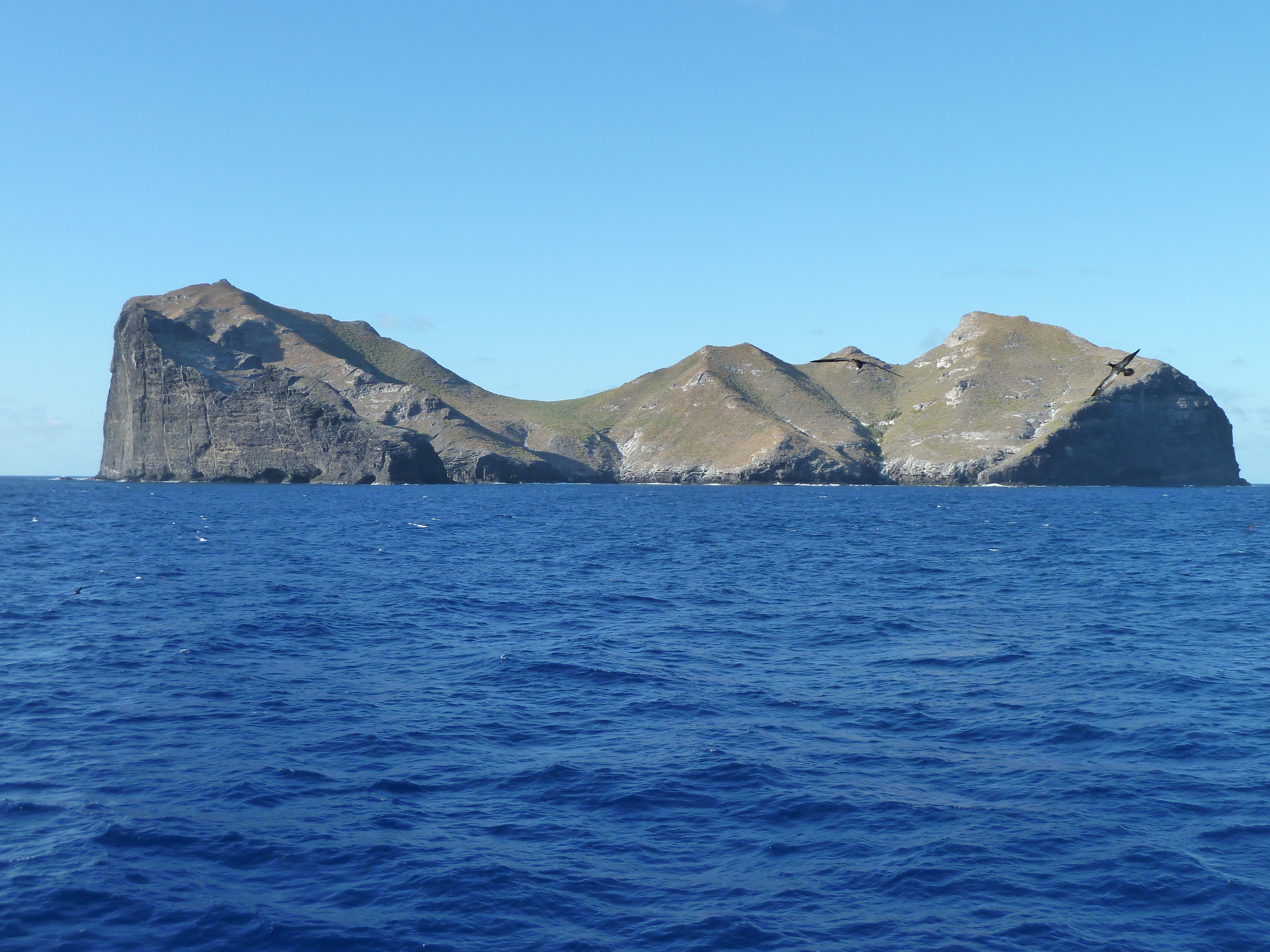
- View of Nīhoa Island

- Location within Hawaiian Islands
- Nearest city: Waimea, Kauaʻi, Hawai`i
- NRHP reference No.: 88000640
- Added to NRHP: June 13, 1988

Nīhoa was well known to the early Hawaiians. Archaeological expeditions found extensive prehistoric agricultural terraces and house sites. At least one site has been dated to around the 1st millennium AD, sometime between 867 and 1037. There is some doubt as to the number of people that lived on Nīhoa, because while the large terraces suggest a considerable number, there is scant fresh water to be found. Archaeologists Kenneth Emory and Paul Cleghorn estimate that water could support as many as 100 people, although if the island were previously forested, this would have increased fresh water supplies relative to its current state. Because of the island's importance, the island was added to the National Register of Historic Places in 1988, and subsequently became part of Papahānaumokuākea Marine National Monument in June 2006.

Nīhoa, along with Necker Island to the northwest, is among the most northern, isolated, smallest and driest of the high volcanic Hawaiian islands, and receives the lowest dust and tephra input. All of these features were found to strongly predict deforestation among the Pacific Islands. The abandonment of Nīhoa may be tied to deforestation although this has not been proven and small groves of trees were noted in the major drainage valleys during survey work conducted in 1928.

Artifacts recorded on the island represent a unique material culture demonstrating restraint in the utilization of wood. A number of artifact types such as bowls and human figures called kiʻi that elsewhere in the Hawaiian chain would have been made out of wood were instead carved from stone, a lengthy and labor-intensive process. Archaeological sites on the island are similar to other site types within the Hawaiian islands and include both packed dirt and stone terraces likely for habitation and agricultural uses on the steep slopes of the island, cave shelters, and heiau.

The heiau on Nīhoa and Necker Islands are unique in the Hawaiian chain representing a raised pavement of basalt stones with upright stones placed across this pavement often near the edges as opposed to the form common to other islands in the chain represented by a high stacked stone wall enclosing a central space. This difference in form represents an earlier iteration of Hawaiian monumental architecture that offers a unique perspective on cultural norms prior to the abandonment of Nīhoa. Thanks to this difference in form, scholars often use the term 'marae' as opposed to 'heiau' in reference to these structures and some scholars argue that the shift in form represents a shift in ritual practice in Hawaii.

== Early exploration ==
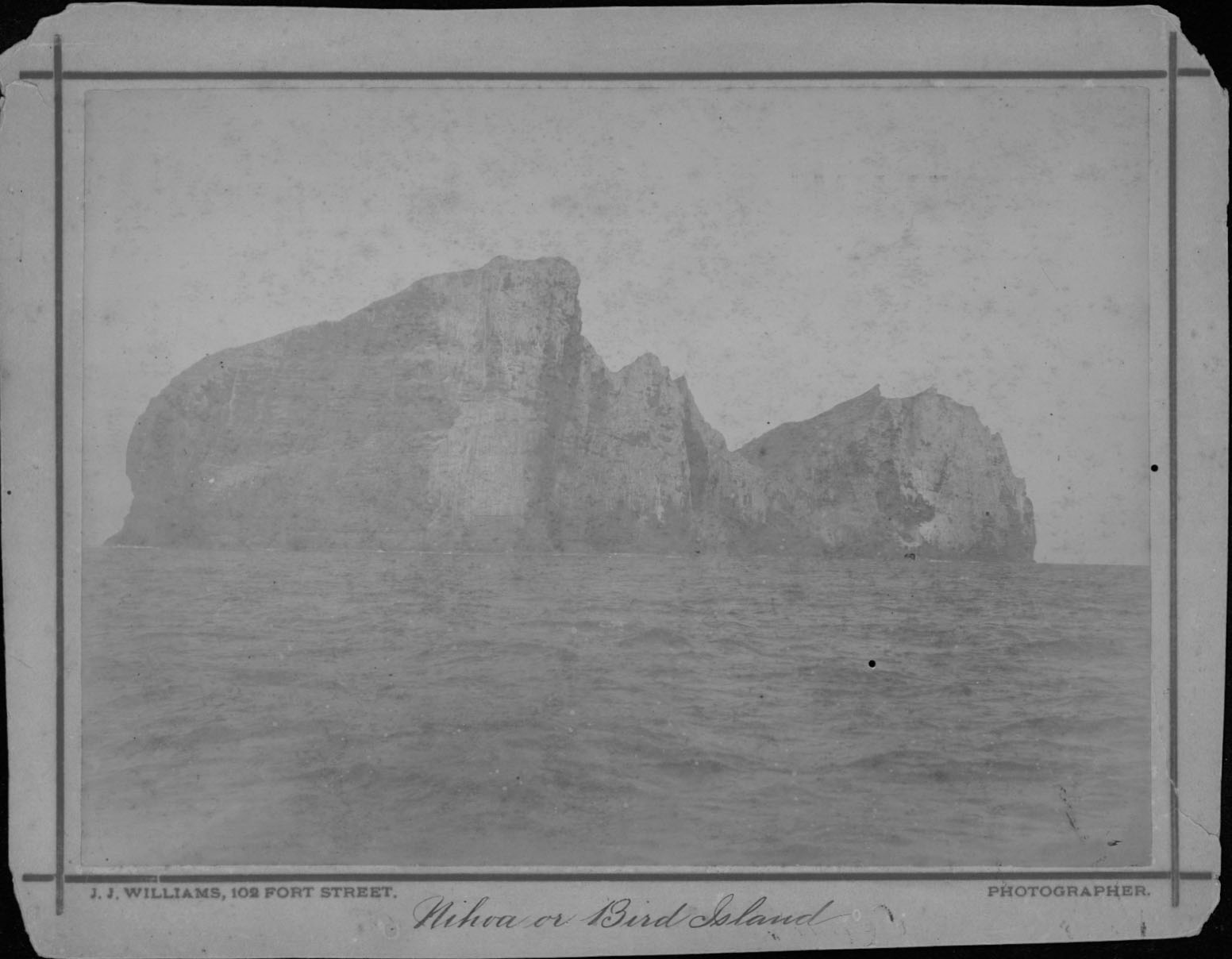
1891 photograph of Nīhoa by J.J. Williams

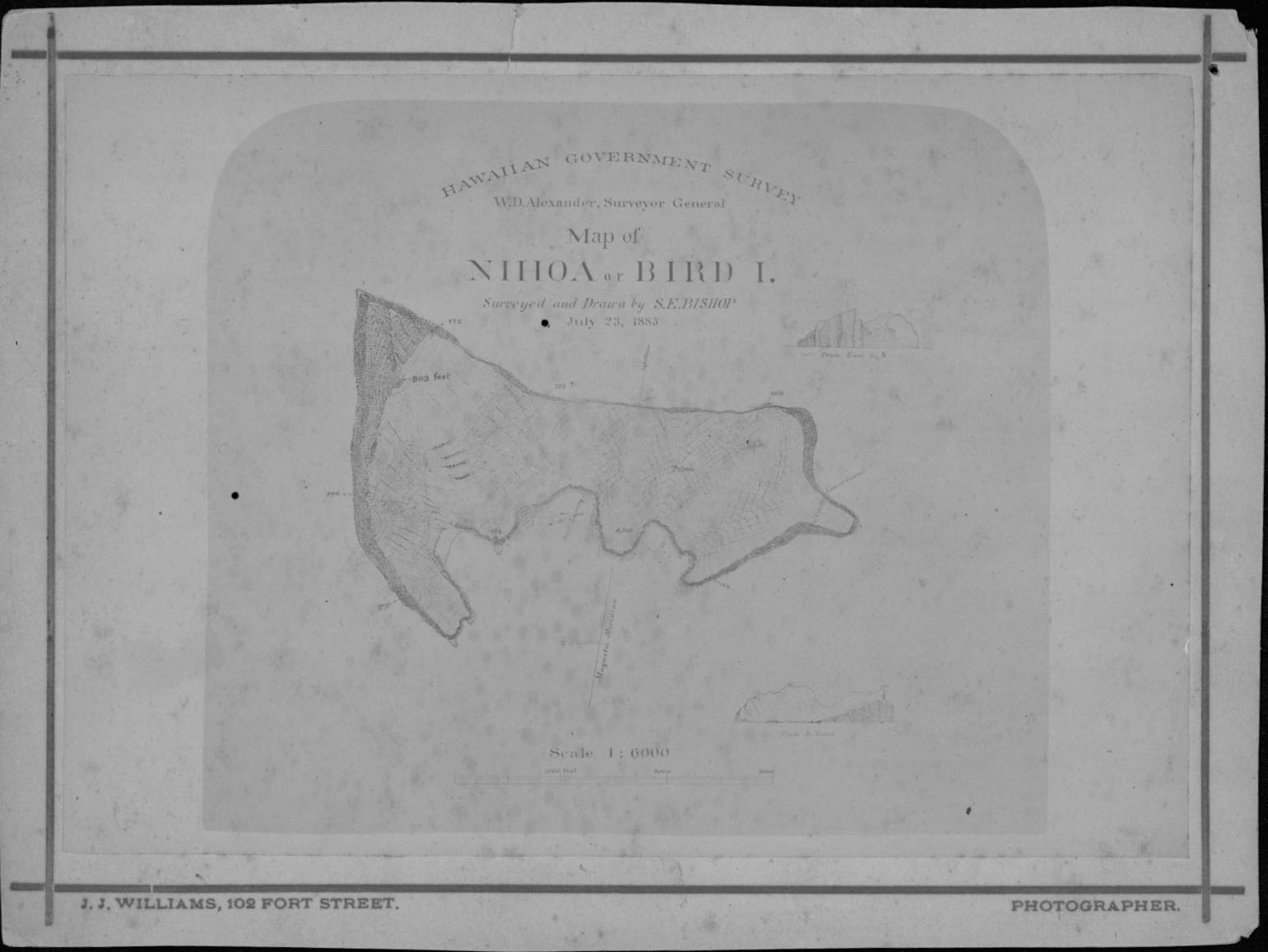
1883 hand drawn map of Nīhoa (Bird) Island

The first Westerner to discover Nīhoa was Captain James Colnett of the Prince of Wales, on March 21, 1788. Due to Colnett's lengthy absence from England, including his imprisonment by the Spanish for his part in the Nootka Sound Incident, the discovery was once widely accredited to Captain William Douglas of the Iphigenia, who sighted Nīhoa almost a year later.

The abandoned settlements seen by the early explorers caused Nīhoa and Necker islands to be called the 'mystery islands'. However, this term is used more generally to refer to any island in the Pacific that was similarly abandoned prior to European contact.

By the end of the 18th century, Nīhoa had been forgotten by most Hawaiians. In 1822, Queen Kaʻahumanu and her husband King Kaumualiʻi traveled with Captain William Sumner to find Nīhoa, as her generation had only known the island through songs and myths. Later, King Kamehameha IV sailed there to officially annex the island as part of the Kingdom of Hawaiʻi. Finally, in 1885, Princess Liliuokalani made a pilgrimage to Nihoa with her escorts, but their luncheon was cut short when one of the party ignited a wildfire by accident. The group tried to flee the island, but the rising tides made it difficult and several boats were flooded, destroying some of the photographs taken. On this visit a carved basalt bowl was found and taken back to the main islands by the Queen.

In 1859 the position of Nīhoa island was determined by the survey schooner, USS Fenimore Cooper.

== Tanager expedition ==
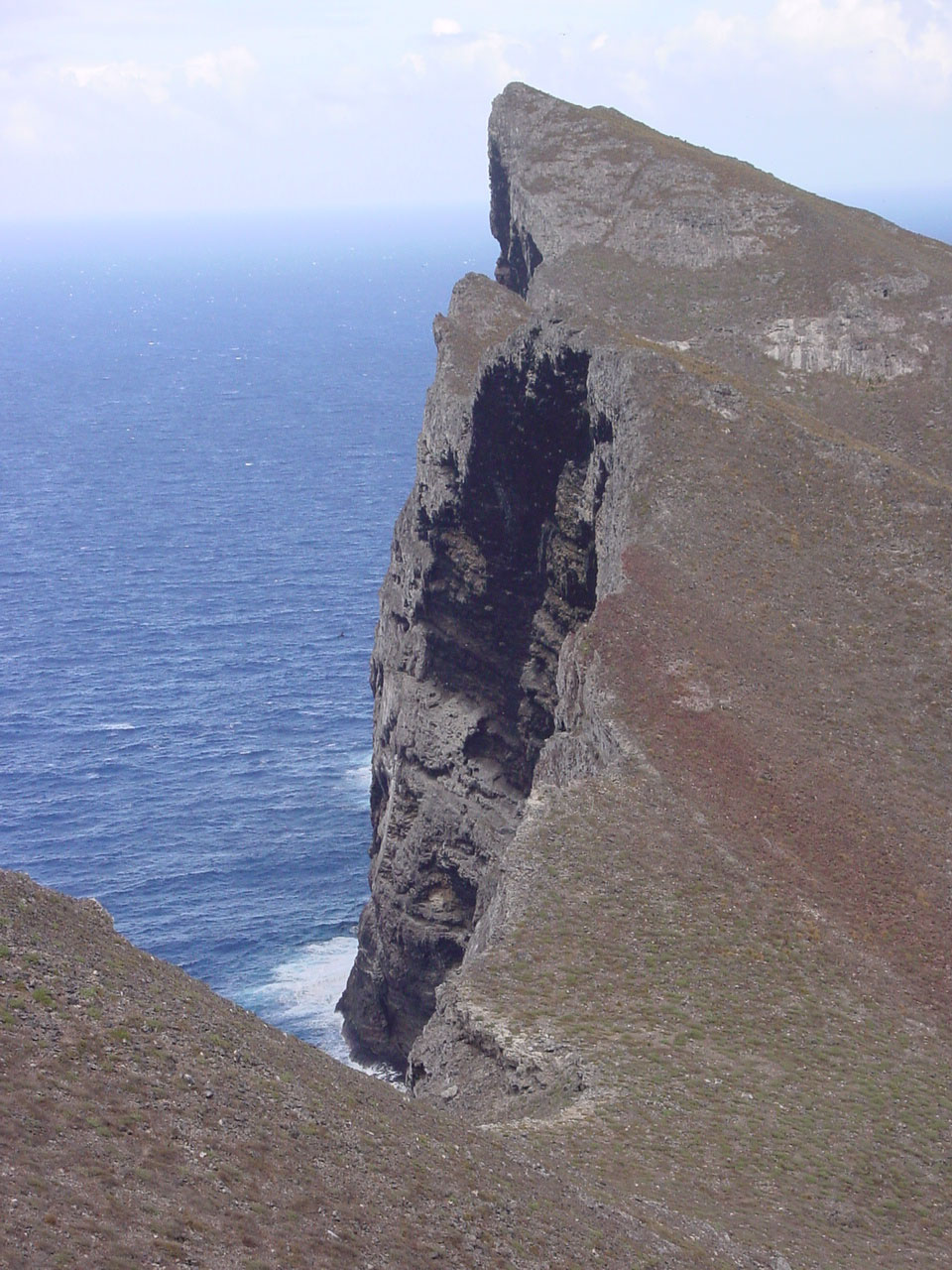
Tanager peak

During 1923-24 the Tanager expedition was a noted scientific exploration of Nīhoa island. This resulted in various biological and archeological discoveries.

The Tanager expedition conducted the first archeological survey of the island. Evidence of an ancient settlement on Nīhoa was discovered, along with platforms, terraces, and human remains.

Noted events include finding a specimen of Amaranthus brownii and the discovery of the Nīhoa millerbird which was formally named Acrocephalus familiaris kingi.

On this expedition, several hundred Loulu fan palms were counted on the island. Twenty other flowering plants were also noted at this time.

Examples of exploration work:

- Survey map of island
- Bird life
- Plants
- Insects
- Marine life
- Geology

On the Tanager expedition they also found the remnants of a modern fishing camp in a cave near the landing, with some leftover coats and bags of rice.

== See also ==
- Desert island
- List of islands
- List of volcanoes in the Hawaiian – Emperor seamount chain
