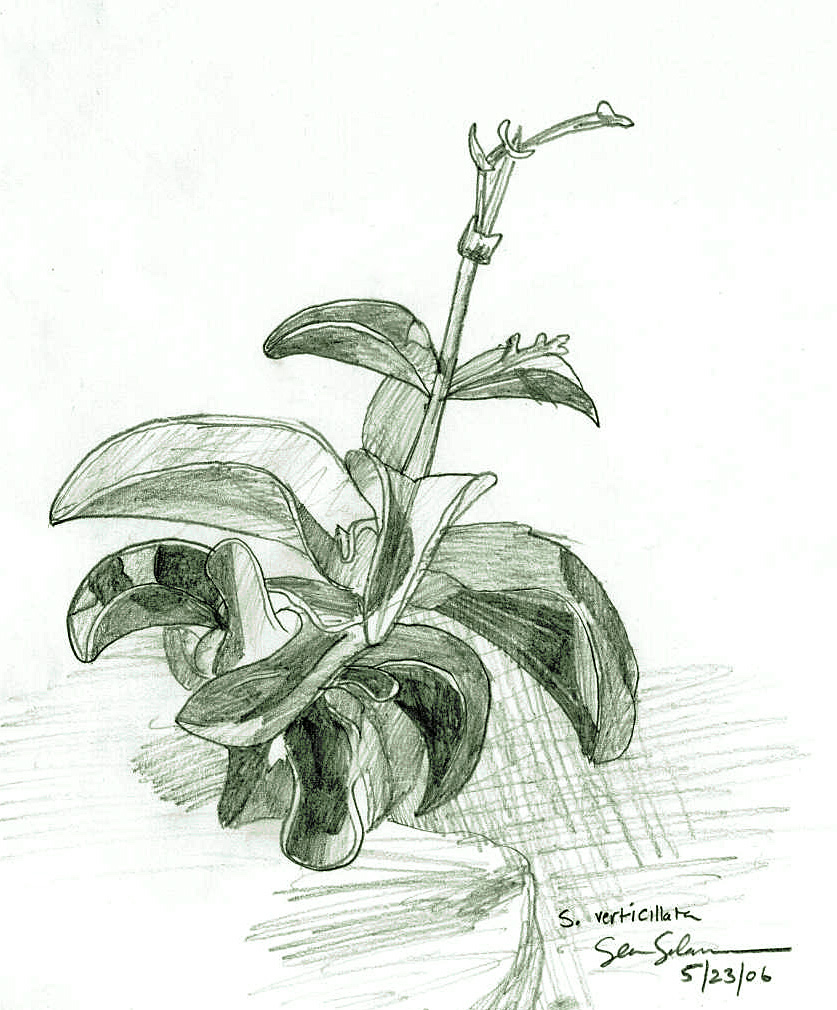
- Artist's rendition of Nīhoa carnation; note triangular-shaped leaves

Conservation status
- Imperiled (NatureServe)

- Critically Endangered (IUCN 3.1)

Scientific classification
- Kingdom: Plantae
- Clade: Tracheophytes
- Clade: Angiosperms
- Clade: Eudicots
- Order: Caryophyllales
- Family: Caryophyllaceae
- Genus: Schiedea
- Species: S. verticillata

Binomial name
- Schiedea verticillata F.Br.

= Schiedea verticillata =

Species of flowering plant

Schiedea verticillata, known as the devils slide schiedea or Nīhoa carnation, is an endangered species of plant in the family Caryophyllaceae, endemic to the island of Nīhoa in the Northwestern Hawaiian Islands, where it was discovered in 1923 by the Tanager Expedition. It has been listed as endangered since 1996.

It has stems 40–60 cm (16–24 in) long, erect or sometimes trailing, and fleshy mint-colored leaves as long as 15 cm. The flowers are petal-less, have ten stamens and 4-5 styles. The plant estivates, dying back to the fleshy perennial roots during the dry season. Less than 400 individual plants survive in two of Nīhoa's rocky valleys, but the population has remained stable. How this plant is pollinated is not known. Even though there are very few individuals surviving, the carnation can avoid inbreeding, a problem that threatens fellow Nihoan plant Amaranthus brownii, because this carnation has the highest genetic diversity of its genus.
