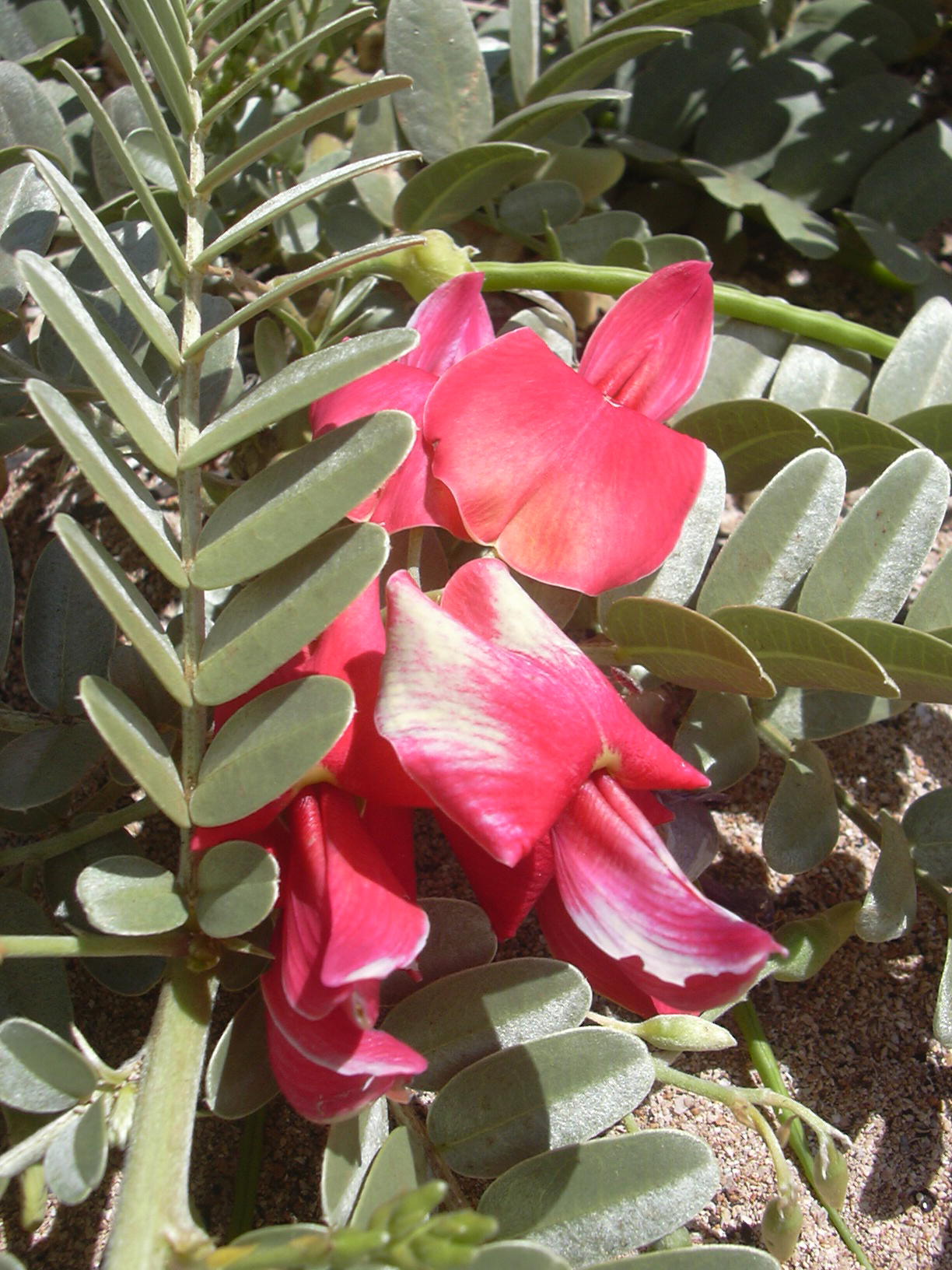

Conservation status
- Imperiled (NatureServe)

Scientific classification
- Kingdom: Plantae
- Clade: Tracheophytes
- Clade: Angiosperms
- Clade: Eudicots
- Clade: Rosids
- Order: Fabales
- Family: Fabaceae
- Subfamily: Faboideae
- Genus: Sesbania
- Species: S. tomentosa

Binomial name
- Sesbania tomentosa Hook. & Arn.

Synonyms
- Agati tomentosa (Hook. & Arn.) Nutt. ex A.Gray

= Sesbania tomentosa =

Species of legume

Sesbania tomentosa, commonly known as Oahu riverhemp and ʻōhai, is an endangered species of plant in the pea family, Fabaceae, that is endemic to the main Hawaiian Islands as well as Nīhoa and Necker Island. It inhabits low shrublands and, rarely, dry forests, at elevations from sea level to 2,500 ft (760 m). Associated native plant species include ʻakiʻaki (Sporobolus virginicus), ʻilima (Sida fallax), naupaka kahakai (Scaevola taccada), and pili (Heteropogon contortus). Off-road vehicles, wildfires, grazing, and alien species competition have destroyed their habitat on the main islands, but they are still quite common on Nīhoa and Necker. At least 2,000 specimens grow on Nīhoa, while there are far less on Necker.

ʻŌhai is highly polymorphic, exhibiting broad variations in color and shape. Plants that grow on Nīhoa have reddish-orange flowers and young leaflets that are relatively hairless. Necker plants have salmon to orange colored-flowers, and leaflets that are very hairy. A form that grows as a standing tree exists on Molokaʻi. ʻŌhai grows as a prostrate shrub with semi-glaucous hairless leaves on the southernmost tip of the island of Hawaiʻi, Ka Lae.
