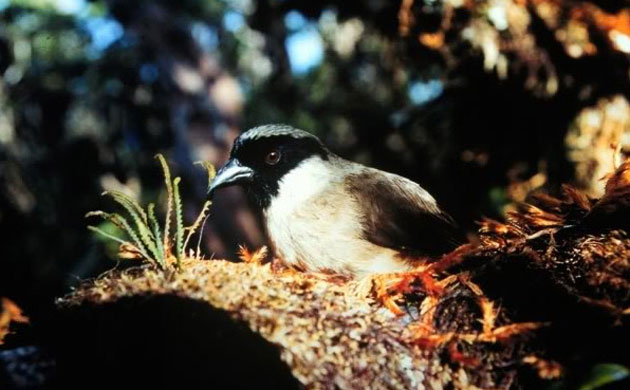

Conservation status
- Extinct (2004) (IUCN 3.1)

- Presumed Extinct (2004) (NatureServe)

Scientific classification
- Kingdom: Animalia
- Phylum: Chordata
- Class: Aves
- Order: Passeriformes
- Family: Fringillidae
- Subfamily: Carduelinae
- Genus: †Melamprosops; Casey & Jacobi, 1974
- Species: †M. phaeosoma

Binomial name
- †Melamprosops phaeosoma Casey & Jacobi, 1974

= Poʻouli =

Poʻo-uli

Extinct species of passerine bird

The poʻo-uli (Melamprosops phaeosoma) or Hawaiian black-faced honeycreeper is an extinct species of passerine bird that was endemic to the island of Maui in Hawaiʻi. It is considered to be a member of the Hawaiian honeycreepers, and is the only member of its genus Melamprosops. It had a black head, brown upper parts and pale gray underparts. This bird inhabited only the wetter, easternmost side of Maui, where it had rapidly decreased in numbers. With extinction threatening, efforts were made to capture birds to enable them to breed in captivity. These efforts were unsuccessful; in 2004, only two known birds remained, and since then, no further birds have been sighted. A 2018 study recommended declaring the species extinct, citing bird population decline patterns and the lack of any confirmed sightings since 2004, and in 2019, the species was declared extinct.

== Description ==
The poʻo-uli was brown above and grayish-white below, with a broad black mask extending behind the eye. Adults were silvery-gray above the mask, shading into brown at the crown, with a bold, pale patch just behind the mask. Juveniles were similar but buffier below with a smaller mask and without gray above. Most published images of the poʻouli are of the juvenile plumage.

== Discovery ==
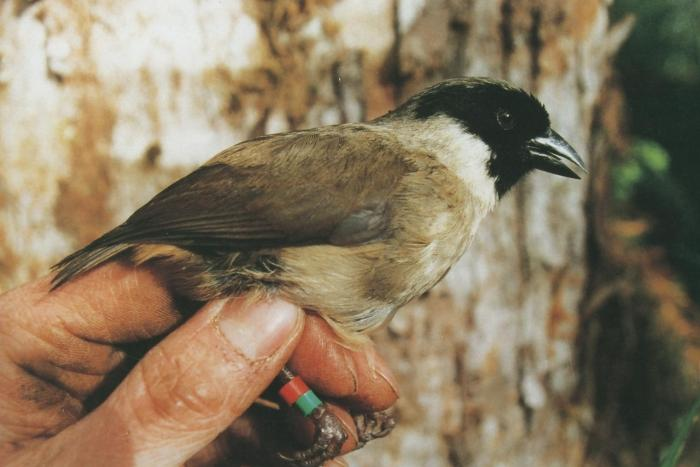
Poʻo-uli

The poʻo-uli was discovered in 1973 when students from the University of Hawaiʻi found the bird on the north-eastern slopes of Haleakalā on the island of Maui. It was found during the Hana Rainforest Project at an altitude of 1,980 metres (6,500 ft) above sea level. The poʻo-uli was the first species of Hawaiian honeycreeper to be discovered since 1923.

== Taxonomy ==
It was dissimilar to other Hawaiian birds; evidence based on DNA analysis supports it as being the most ancient of all the Hawaiian honeycreeper lineages to survive to recent times, its lineage having split off from the rest of the Hawaiian honeycreepers during the late Miocene, about 5.7-5.8 million years ago. The Hawaiian honeycreeper lineage itself only diverged from its common ancestor with Carpodacus around 7.2 million years ago; this would make the divergence of the poʻouli chronologically closer to the initial divergence from the common ancestor with Carpodacus than to the divergence of most other Hawaiian honeycreeper lineages (aside from the one containing Oreomystis and Paroreomyza, which diverged about a million years after Melamprosops's lineage), most of which diverged after the mid-Pliocene, 3.77 mya. Around the time the poʻouli lineage originated, Ni'ihau and Kauai were the only two large Hawaiian islands in existence (aside from the then-larger Northwestern Hawaiian Islands), indicating that the poʻouli's lineage must have evolved there and eventually spread to Maui Nui at some point after it first arose in the early Pleistocene, with the recent poʻouli evolving on and/or eventually becoming restricted to Maui.

== Diet ==
Its diet consisted mostly of snails, insects, and spiders and it nested in native ʻōhiʻa lehua (Metrosideros polymorpha) forests. Poʻouli relied more on an insectivorous diet because the snails' diets required more foraging.

== Status and conservation ==
In the past, at least according to fossil records, it appears that the poʻouli inhabited the drier half of the island of Maui, across the southwestern slope of Haleakalā, at altitudes of 275–1,350 metres (902–4,429 ft).

Fossils show that the poʻouli once lived at Maui's lower elevations in more arid environments, thriving on a presumed diet of native tree snails, invertebrates, insects and their larvae. The relatively recent arrival of lethal, mosquito-transmitted avian malaria in Hawaii quickly wiped out the low-elevation birds, forcing a rapid relocation, en masse, to higher elevations and mountain rainforests; this move showed a likely avoidance of mosquitoes by the birds. Moving to higher elevations also meant adjusting their diets, coming to avoid flying insects and focus on mollusks and other invertebrates. Overall, the sharp decrease in numbers (and subsequent relocation of survivors) negatively affected the poʻouli's once-thriving existence, their genetic diversity and population growth, reproduction and overall distribution.

When the species was first discovered, 100–200 poʻo-uli were estimated to exist. There were only 76 birds per km^{2}. By 1981, there were only 15 birds per km^{2}. By 1985, there were only 8 per km^{2}: from 1975 (when it was first discovered) to 1985, only ten years later, the population had dropped by over 90 percent. In the 1980s, the poʻo-uli disappeared from the easternmost part of its range and was only found in the western branch of the Hanawi Stream.

To preserve the poʻo-uli and other endangered fauna and flora, the State of Hawaii established the 9,500-acre (38 km^{2}) Hanawi Natural Area Reserve. This connected several protected areas to make one larger protective area. This protection effort was only possible due to the work of several groups: the government, Maui County, the National Park Service, The Nature Conservancy, and several private companies. The land was fenced off and by June 1996 they began to clear out the pigs from the closed areas. Four years and 202 pigs later, the poʻo-uli pen was completely cleared of pigs. As more pigs were removed from the other two pens, the population of native species that lived there, e.g. the Maui parrotbill and ʻākohekohe, rose slightly faster than they otherwise would have. Rats, cats, and goats were still being removed from the poʻo-uli pen.

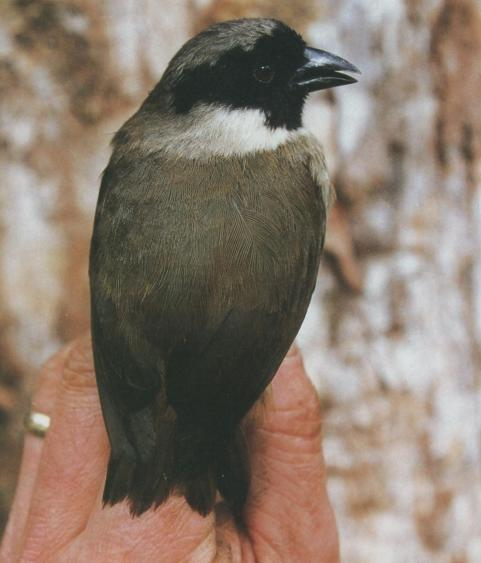
Adult

By 1997, only three individuals were known to exist. These had home ranges within the Hanawi Natural Area Reserve and the adjacent Haleakala National Park.

In 2002, one of these, a female, was captured and taken to a male's home range in an attempt to get them to breed. The female, however, had flown back to her own territory, which was 1.5 miles (2.4 km) away, by the next day. There was also a ten-day expedition in 2004. The goal was to capture the three birds and bring them to a conservation center on the island, with the hopes that they would produce captive-bred offspring.

On September 9, 2004, one of the remaining birds, a male, was captured and taken to the Maui Bird Conservation Center in Olinda, in an attempt to breed the bird in captivity. However, biologists could not find a mate for the male before it died, around two months later, on November 26, 2004.

It is uncertain whether the other two birds that remained at the time were a male and female, or two of the same sex. Since 2004, extensive surveys failed to locate these or any other individual poʻouli, indicating a possible extinction. However, they remained listed as critically endangered by BirdLife International (and thereby the IUCN) until additional surveys had confirmed extinction beyond a reasonable doubt. Tissue samples were taken from the male captured in 2004 for possible future cloning.

The San Diego Zoo in California retains potentially viable poʻouli genetic material at their research center, the Frozen Zoo.

The poʻouli's dramatic population decline has been attributed to a number of factors; habitat loss from human activities, mosquito-transmitted disease, native habitat degradation caused by introduced Indian axis deer, predation by feral pigs, rats, cats, and especially the small Asian mongoose have all contributed. An overall decline in the native tree snails (due to many of the same factors) that the poʻouli relied on for food has also been a leading cause in their disappearance.

In 2019, after continued habitat degradation, presence of disease and invasive species, and a long period with no sightings, the IUCN classified the poʻouli as extinct. On September 29, 2021, the U.S. Fish and Wildlife Service declared the Poʻouli extinct and the species was delisted from the Endangered Species Act on October 16, 2023.

== See also ==
- List of recently extinct birds
- List of extinct animals of the Hawaiian Islands
- Holocene extinction
