= Vangulifer =

Vangulifer Temporal range: Holocene

Scientific classification
- Kingdom: Animalia
- Phylum: Chordata
- Class: Aves
- Order: Passeriformes
- Family: Fringillidae
- Subfamily: Carduelinae
- Genus: †Vangulifer; Olson & James, 1991

Species
- †Vangulifer mirandus; †Vangulifer neophasis

Extinct genus of birds

Vangulifer is an extinct genus containing two species of Hawaiian honeycreeper known as 'shovel-billed finches'. It is known from sub-fossil remains found on Maui. They may have been insectivores, using their flat, rounded bills to catch flying insects in the air, although this is uncertain.

== Species ==
- Vangulifer mirandus - prehistoric
- Vangulifer neophasis - prehistoric

== Taxonomy ==
Vangulifer was first described in 1991 by Olson & James from sub-fossil remains discovered in 1988 in lava tubes on the southern slopes of Haleakala volcano. Because of a lack of DNA evidence, the placement of Vangulifer is uncertain, though some phylogenetic analyses have shown that it may be most closely related to Paroreomyza and Oreomystis.
