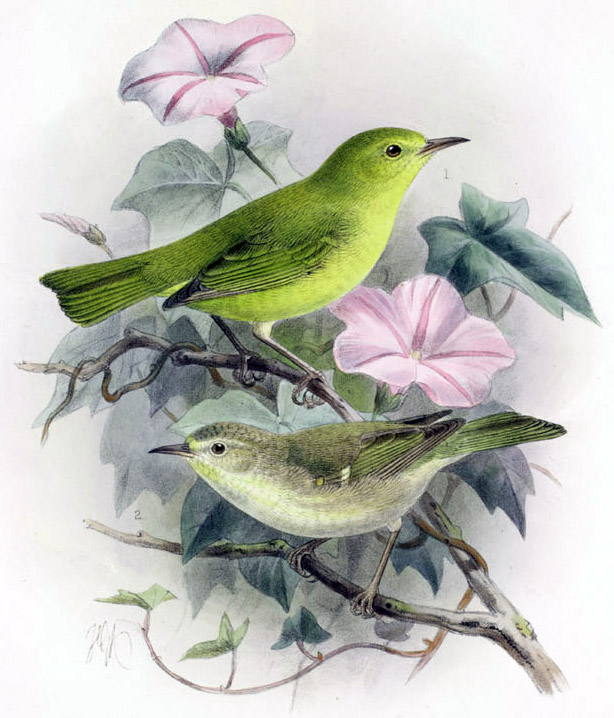
- Paroreomyza montana montana

Conservation status
- Extinct (1937) (IUCN 3.1)

Scientific classification
- Kingdom: Animalia
- Phylum: Chordata
- Class: Aves
- Order: Passeriformes
- Family: Fringillidae
- Subfamily: Carduelinae
- Genus: Paroreomyza
- Species: P. montana
- Subspecies: †P. m. montana

Trinomial name
- †Paroreomyza montana montana (S.B. Wilson, 1890)

= Lānaʻi ʻalauahio =

Extinct subspecies of bird

The Lānaʻi ʻalauahio (Paroreomyza montana montana) is an extinct subspecies of Hawaiian honeycreeper, found on much of the island of Lana'i in the Hawaiian archipelago. It apparently was common until the early 1900s, when there appeared to have been a steep decline in birds on the island. It was similar to the Maui alauahio and this species may have reacted similarly to its existing relative, to which it was considered conspecific. This bird was one of several to vanish from Lana'i, along with others such as the Lanai hookbill.

The extinction of this species was primarily driven by habitat degradation. Apparently the many forest plants of Lana'i had become displaced, rare or even extinct as a result of human activity. With settlers came a host of invasive plants from Europe and other continents. The nail in the coffin for the 'alauahio may have been the destruction of forest associated with the construction of the island's main city, Lanai City.

Though not much of its natural history is known, its song was recorded to be a simple chip that was sung at an interval of one chip every three seconds. It disappeared in 1937, the same year that the ʻUla-ʻai-hāwane disappeared on Hawaii.
