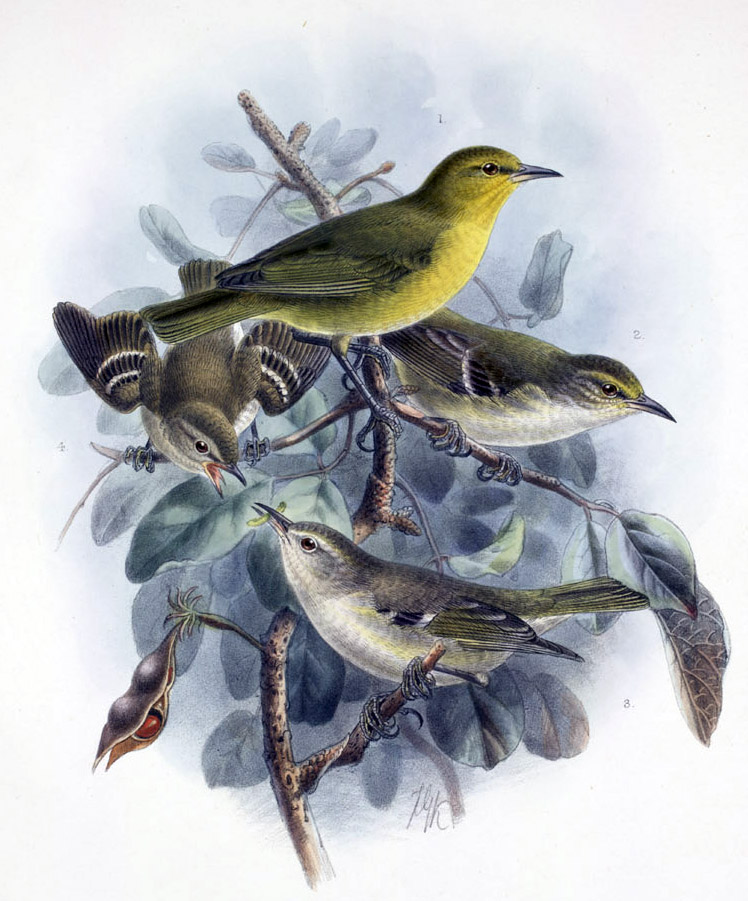
- Adult and juveniles

Conservation status
- Critically endangered, possibly extinct (IUCN 3.1)

Scientific classification
- Kingdom: Animalia
- Phylum: Chordata
- Class: Aves
- Order: Passeriformes
- Family: Fringillidae
- Subfamily: Carduelinae
- Genus: Paroreomyza
- Species: P. maculata

Binomial name
- Paroreomyza maculata (Cabanis, 1851)
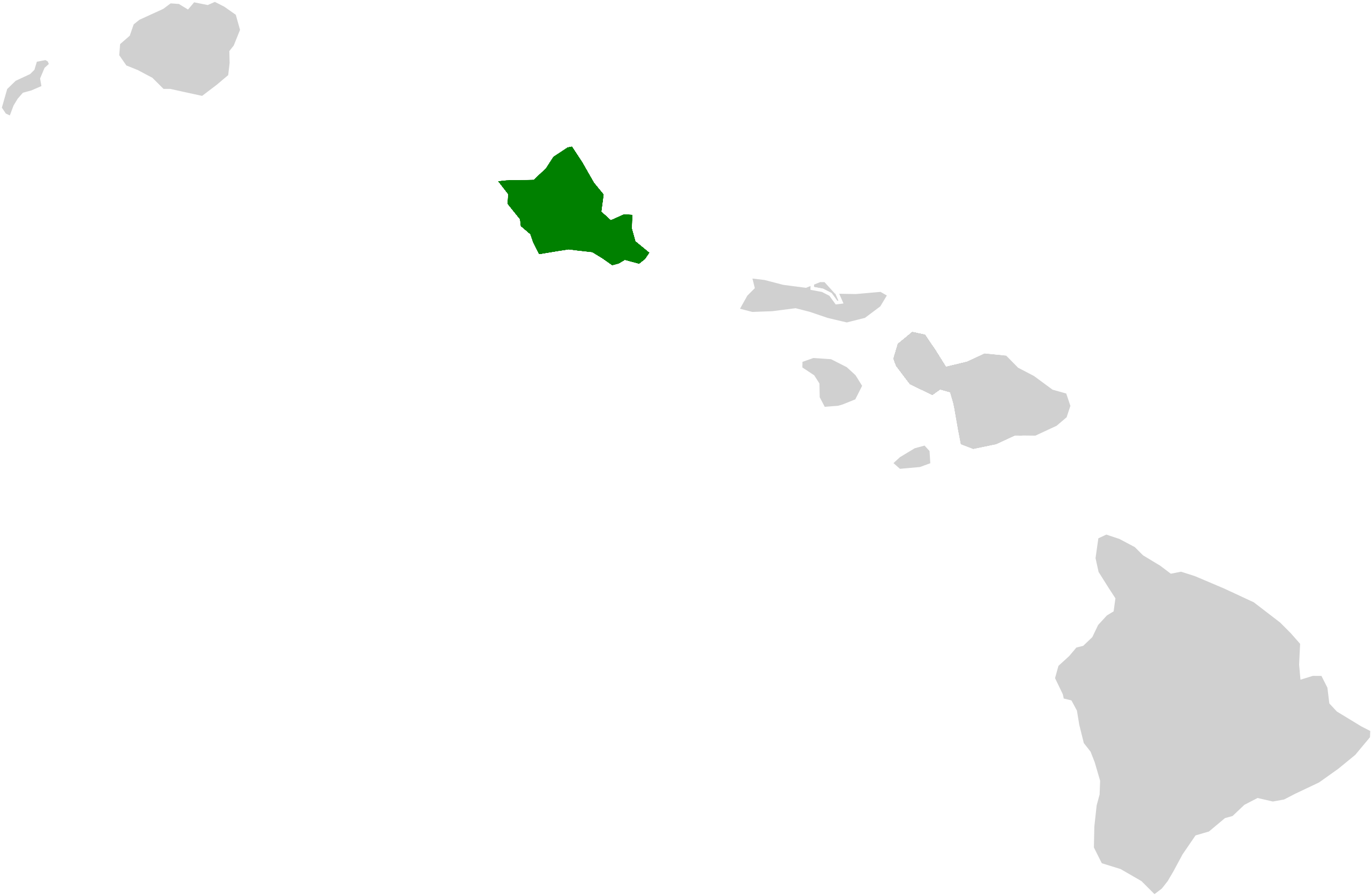

= Oʻahu ʻalauahio =

Species of bird

The Oʻahu ʻalauahio (Paroreomyza maculata), also known as the Oʻahu creeper, is a small finch-like Hawaiian honeycreeper that is endemic to the Hawaiian island of Oahu. It is Critically endangered.

== Description ==
Turnaround video of a male specimen, Naturalis Biodiversity Center

It is a small, yellow green bird with a bluish bill. It is 4 inches (100 mm) long and is green on the back and tail. The head and underparts are yellow. The face is a brighter yellow with a dark green eyestripe. Juveniles are browner with white wingbars. It feeds on invertebrates hidden under the bark of trees, and it uses its bill to remove the bark and catch the insects using its specialized tongue.

== Conservation ==
The bird is Critically Endangered and possibly extinct due to disease (avian malaria), introduced and invasive plants and wildlife, and habitat loss. The last specimen was collected in 1968 and this is considered by some authorities to be the last reliable report. The last visual observation was of two individuals on the Poamoho Trail (near Wahiawa) in a Christmas Bird Count on 12 December 1985.

Shortly after the last visual observation, a large portion of habitat in the North Halawa Valley, where most of the bird's most recent confirmed sightings were made, was destroyed for Interstate H-3, with U.S. Senator Daniel Inouye adding a rider to exempt the freeway from environmental laws such as the Endangered Species Act, which would have otherwise protected the bird's habitat but blocked highway construction. The construction is thought to have led to a very rapid decline in the bird's already-small population, which is likely why no well-supported reports have been made since 1985, although unconfirmed reports are still filed and not all potential habitat has been surveyed. Part of the doubt and uncertainty surrounding recent observations of this species is its similarity to the Oʻahu ʻamakihi (Chlorodrepanis flava), which may be the second to last remaining endemic honeycreeper of Oʻahu if the ʻalauahio is extinct (ʻapapane). The IUCN Red List estimates that less than 50, and likely only about 1–7 individuals, remain if the species is still extant.
