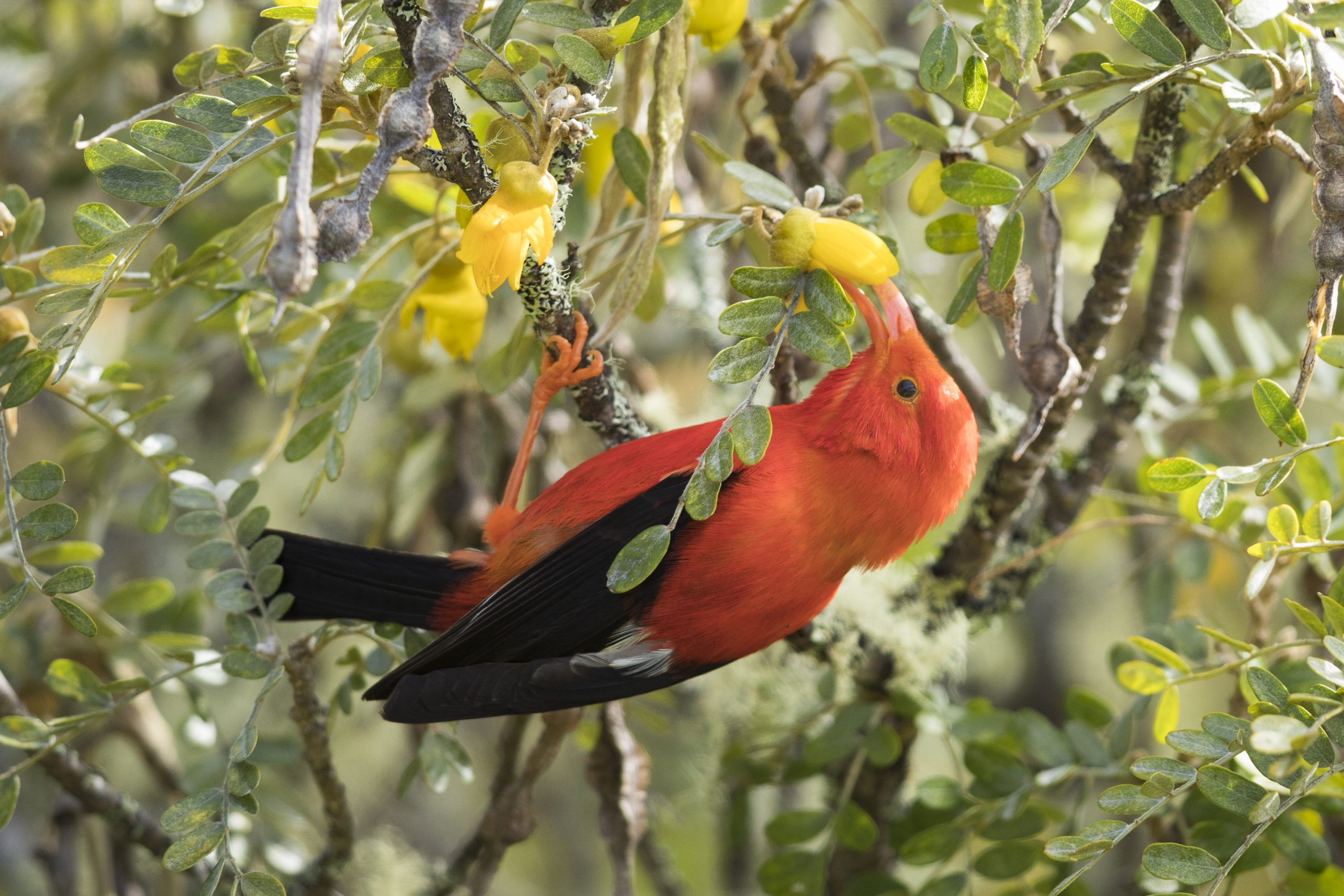
- ʻIʻiwi (Drepanis coccinea)

Scientific classification
- Kingdom: Animalia
- Phylum: Chordata
- Class: Aves
- Order: Passeriformes
- Family: Fringillidae
- Subfamily: Carduelinae

Genera
- See text

Synonyms
- Drepanididae; Drepanidini (see text); Drepaniidae; Drepanidinae

= Hawaiian honeycreeper =

Subfamily of birds

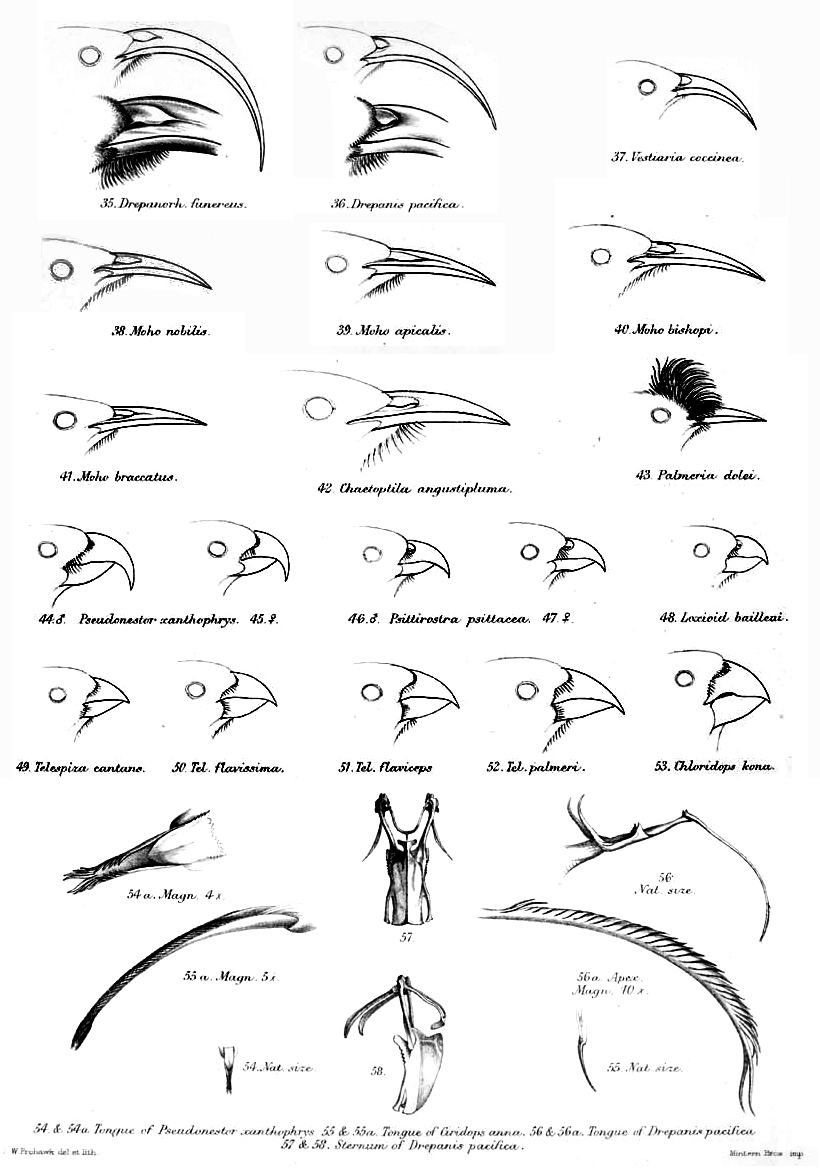
Beak and tongue shapes of Hawaiian honeycreepers and the Mohoidae

Hawaiʻian honeycreepers are a group of small birds endemic to Hawaiʻi. They are members of the finch family Fringillidae, closely related to the rosefinches (Carpodacus), but many species have evolved features unlike those present in any other finch, such as greatly elongated and curved bills. Their great morphological diversity is the result of adaptive radiation following ecological release in an insular environment. Over 60 species are thought to have existed prior to the human colonisation of Hawaii. Only 17 species are confirmed to be alive today. Many have been driven to extinction since the first humans arrived in Hawaiʻi, with extinctions increasing over the last two centuries following European discovery of the islands, with habitat destruction and especially invasive species being the main causes.

== Taxonomy ==
Before the introduction of molecular phylogenetic techniques, the relationship of the Hawaiian honeycreepers to other bird species was controversial. The honeycreepers were sometimes categorized as a family Drepanididae, other authorities considered them a subfamily, Drepanidinae, of Fringillidae, the finch family. The entire group was also called Drepanidini in treatments where buntings and American sparrows (Passerellidae) were included in the finch family; this term is preferred for just one subgroup of the birds today. Most recently, the entire group has been subsumed into the finch subfamily Carduelinae, without a named taxon assigned to this group.

=== Evolution and phylogeny ===
The Hawaiian honeycreepers are the sister taxon to the Carpodacus rosefinches. Their ancestors are thought to have been from Asia and diverged from Carpodacus about 7.2 million years ago, and they are thought to have first arrived and radiated on the Hawaiian Islands between 5.7–7.2 million years ago, which was roughly the same time that the islands of Ni'ihau and Kauai formed. The lineage of the recently extinct po'ouli (Melamprosops) was the most ancient of the Hawaiian honeycreeper lineages to survive to recent times, diverging about 5.7–5.8 million years ago. The lineage containing Oreomystis and Paroreomyza was the second to diverge, diverging about a million years after the po'ouli's lineage. Most of the other lineages with highly distinctive morphologies are thought to have originated in the mid-late Pliocene, after the formation of Oahu but prior to the formation of Maui. Due to this, Oahu likely played a key role in the formation of diverse morphologies among honeycreepers, allowing for cycles of colonization and speciation between Kauai and Oahu.

Cladogram of the approximate relationships of most living and recently extinct Hawaiian honeycreepers based on autosomal nuclear DNA, after Campana et al. 2026. Note that there is some uncertainty regarding the interrelationships between the two genera of "creepers" (Oreomystis and Paroreomyza), which some analyses find to be a monophyletic group, as well as between the main subgroups of the "primary clade" containing most Hawaiian honeycreepers (which also includes the extinct genera Xestospiza and Vangulifer which are not included in this tree due to the poor quality of their sequenced DNA) due to rapid radiation. There has also been interspecies gene flow between different Hawaiian honeycreeper lineages that is not captured in this diagram.

- †Poʻouli (Melamprosops phaeosoma)
- - ʻAkikiki (Oreomystis bairdi)
  - - Paroreomyza
      - †Oʻahu ʻalauahio (Paroreomyza maculata)
      - - Maui ʻAlauahio (Paroreomyza montana newtoni)
        - †Kākāwahie (Paroreomyza flammea)
    - "primary clade"
      - - - "red‑and‑black birds"
            - ʻAkohekohe (Palmeria dolei)
            - - ʻiʻiwi (Vestiaria coccinea)
              - - †Laysan honeycreeper (Himatione fraithii)
                - ʻApapane (Himatione sanguinea)
          - finchbills
            - †Rhodacanthis
              - †Lesser koa finch (Rhodacanthis flaviceps)
              - †Greater koa finch (Rhodacanthis palmeri)
            - - †Kona grosbeak (Chloridops kona)
              - - Palila (Loxioides bailleui)
                - Telespiza
                  - Laysan finch/ʻekupuʻu (Telespiza cantans)
                  - Nīhoa finch/'palihoa' (Telespiza ultima)
        - - - - †Lānaʻi hookbill (Dysmorodrepanis munroi)
              - †ʻŌʻū (Psittirostra psittacea)
            - - †Drepanis
                - †Black mamo (Drepanis funerea)
                - †Hawaii mamo (Drepanis pacifica)
              - - †Greater ʻamakihi (Viridonia sagittirostris)
                - †ʻUla-ʻai-hāwane(Ciridops anna)
          - "green birds"
            - - ʻAnianiau (Magumma parva)
              - †Akialoa
                - †Kauaʻi ʻakialoa (Akialoa stejnegeri)
                - - †Oʻahu ʻakialoa (Akialoa ellisiana)
                  - †Lesser ʻakialoa (Akialoa obscura)
            - - Maui parrotbill/kiwikiu (Pseudonestor xanthophrys)
              - - Hemignathus
                  - †Oʻahu nukupuʻu (Hemignathus lucidus)
                  - - †Kauaʻi nukupuʻu (Hemignathus hanapepe)
                    - - †Maui nukupuʻu (Hemignathus affinis)
                      - ʻAkiapōlāʻau (Hemignathus wilsoni)
                - - Loxops
                    - Hawaii creeper/alawī (Loxops mana)
                    - - Akekeʻe (Loxops caeruleirostris)
                      - - †Oʻahu ʻākepa (Loxops wolstenholmei)
                        - - Hawaiʻi ʻākepa (Loxops coccineus)
                          - †Maui ʻākepa (Loxops ochraceus)
                  - Chlorodrepanis
                    - Kauaʻi ʻamakihi (Chlorodrepanis stejnegeri)
                    - - Maui ʻamakihi (Chlorodrepanis virens wilsoni)
                      - - Hawaiʻi ʻamakihi (Chlorodrepanis virens)
                        - Oʻahu ʻamakihi (Chlorodrepanis flava)

The classification of Paroreomyza and Oreomystis as sister genera and their position within the larger clade is based on genetic and molecular evidence, and has been affirmed by numerous studies; however, when morphological evidence only is used, the recovered relationships change, as Oreomystis shares traits with the derived honeycreepers, such as a squared-off tongue and a distinct musty odor, that Paroreomyza does not. This does not align with the genetic evidence supporting Paroreomyza and Oreomystis as sister genera, and it would be seemingly impossible for only Paroreomyza to have lost the distinctive traits but Oreomystis and all core honeycreepers to have retained or convergently evolved them, thus presenting a taxonomic conundrum.

Viridonia (containing the greater ʻamakihi) may be associated with or even synonymous with the genus Aidemedia (containing the prehistoric icterid-like and sickle-billed gapers), and has the most debated taxonomy; it was long classified within the "greater Hemignathus" radiation (a now-paraphyletic grouping containing species formerly lumped within Hemignathus, including Hemignathus, Akialoa, and Chlorodrepanis) and while some sources speculate it as being sister to Chlorodrepanis (containing the lesser ʻamakihis), other sources speculate it may be a sister genus to the genus Loxops (containing the 'akepas, ʻakekeʻe and ʻalawī).

== Characteristics ==
Nearly all species of Hawaiian honeycreepers have been noted as having a unique odor to their plumage, described by many researchers as "rather like that of old canvas tents".

Today, the flowers of the native ʻōhiʻa (Metrosideros polymorpha) are favored by a number of nectarivorous honeycreepers. The wide range of bill shapes in this group, from thick, finch-like bills to slender, down-curved bills for probing flowers have arisen through adaptive radiation, where an ancestral finch has evolved to fill a large number of ecological niches. Some 20 species of Hawaiian honeycreeper have become extinct in the recent past, and many more in earlier times, following the arrival of humans who introduced non-native animals (ex: rats, pigs, goats, cows) and converted habitat for agriculture.

== Genera and species ==
Over 60 species are thought to have existed prior to human colonisation of Hawaii. 17 species are confirmed to be still living as of 2026.

=== List of species ===
The term "prehistoric" indicates species that became extinct between the initial human settlement of Hawaiʻi (i.e., from the late 1st millennium AD on) and European contact in 1778.

Subfamily Carduelinae

- Drepanidini
  - Genus Aidemedia Olson & James, 1991 – straight thin bills, insectivores
    - Aidemedia chascax Olson & James, 1991 – Oʻahu icterid-like gaper (prehistoric)
    - Aidemedia lutetiae Olson & James, 1991 – Maui Nui icterid-like gaper (prehistoric)
    - Aidemedia zanclops Olson & James, 1991 – sickle-billed gaper (prehistoric)
  - Genus Akialoa Olson & James, 1995 – pointed, long and down-curved bills, insectivorous or nectarivorous
    - Akialoa ellisiana Gray, 1859 – Oʻahu ʻakialoa (extinct, 1940)
    - Akialoa lanaiensis Rothschild, 1893 – Maui Nui ʻakialoa (extinct, 1892)
    - Akialoa stejnegeri Wilson, 1889 – Kauaʻi ʻakialoa (extinct, 1969)
    - Akialoa obscura Cabanis, 1889 – lesser ʻakialoa (extinct, 1940)
    - Akialoa upupirostris – hoopoe-billed ʻakialoa (prehistoric)
  - Genus Chloridops Wilson, 1888 – thick-billed, hard seed (e.g. Myoporum sandwicense) specialist
    - Chloridops kona Wilson, 1888 – Kona grosbeak (extinct, 1894)
    - Chloridops regiskongi – King Kong grosbeak (prehistoric)
    - Chloridops wahi – wahi grosbeak (prehistoric)
  - Genus Chlorodrepanis Olson & James, 1995 – pointed bills, insectivorous and nectarivorous
    - Chlorodrepanis stejnegeri Pratt, 1989 – Kauaʻi ʻamakihi
    - Chlorodrepanis flava Bloxam, 1827 – Oʻahu ʻamakihi
    - Chlorodrepanis virens Cabanis, 1851 – Hawaiʻi ʻamakihi
  - Genus Ciridops Newton, 1892 – finch-like, fed on fruit of Pritchardia species
    - Ciridops anna Dole, 1879 – ʻula-ʻai-hāwane (extinct, 1892 or 1937)
    - Ciridops tenax Olson & James, 1991 stout-legged finch (prehistoric)
  - Genus Drepanis Temminck, 1820 – down-curved bills, nectarivores
    - Drepanis funerea Newton, 1894 – black mamo (extinct, 1907)
    - Drepanis pacifica Gmelin, 1788 – Hawaiʻi mamo (extinct, 1898)
    - Drepanis coccinea Forster, 1780 – ʻiʻiwi
  - Genus Dysmorodrepanis Perkins, 1919 – pincer-like bill, possibly snail specialist
    - Dysmorodrepanis munroi Perkins, 1919 – Lanaʻi hookbill (extinct, 1918)
  - Genus Hemignathus Lichtenstein, 1839 – pointed or long and down-curved bills, insectivorous
    - Hemignathus affinis – Maui nukupuʻu (extinct, 1995–1998)
    - Hemignathus hanapepe – Kauaʻi nukupuʻu (extinct, 1998)
    - Hemignathus lucidus – Oʻahu nukupuʻu (extinct, 1837)
    - Hemignathus vorpalis James & Olson, 2003 – giant nukupu'u (prehistoric)
    - Hemignathus wilsoni Rothschild, 1893 – ʻakiapolaʻau
  - Genus Himatione – thin-billed, nectarivorous
    - Himatione sanguinea Gmelin, 1788 – ʻapapane
    - Himatione fraithii – Laysan honeycreeper (extinct, 1923)
  - Genus Loxioides Oustalet, 1877 – finch-like, Fabales seed specialists
    - Loxioides bailleui Oustalet, 1877 – palila
    - Loxioides kikuichi Olson & James, 2006 – Kaua'i palila (prehistoric, possibly survived to the early 18th century)
  - Genus Loxops – small pointed bills with the tips slightly crossed, insectivorous
    - Loxops caeruleirostris Wilson, 1890 – ‘akeke‘e
    - Loxops coccineus Gmelin, 1789 – Hawaiʻi ʻakepa
    - Loxops ochraceus Rothschild, 1893 - Maui ʻakepa (extinct, 1988)
    - Loxops wolstenholmei Rothschild, 1895 – Oʻahu ʻakepa (extinct, 1990s)
    - Loxops mana Wilson, 1891 – Hawaiʻi creeper
  - Genus Magumma - small pointed bills, insectivorous and nectarivorous
    - Magumma parva Stejneger, 1887 - ʻanianiau
  - Genus Melamprosops Casey & Jacobi, 1974 – short pointed bill, insectivorous and snail specialist
    - Melamprosops phaeosoma Casey & Jacobi, 1974 – poʻouli (extinct, 2004)
  - Genus Oreomystis Wilson, 1891 – short pointed bills, insectivorous
    - Oreomystis bairdi Stejneger, 1887 – ʻakikiki
  - Genus Orthiospiza – large weak bill, possibly soft seed or fruit specialist?
    - Orthiospiza howarthi James & Olson, 1991 - highland finch (prehistoric)
  - Genus Palmeria Rothschild, 1893 – thin-billed, nectarivorous, favors Metrosideros polymorpha
    - Palmeria dolei Wilson, 1891 – ʻakohekohe
  - Genus Paroreomyza – short pointed bills, insectivorous
    - Paroreomyza maculata Cabanis, 1850 – Oʻahu ʻalauahio (possibly extinct, early 1990s?)
    - Paroreomyza flammea (Wilson, 1889) – kākāwahie (extinct, 1963)
    - Paroreomyza montana
      - Paroreomyza montana montana Wilson, 1890 – Lana'i 'alauahio (extinct, 1937)
      - Paroreomyza montana newtoni (Rothschild, 1893) – Maui ‘alauahio
  - Genus Pseudonestor – parrot-like bill, probes wood for insect larvae
    - Pseudonestor xanthophrys Rothschild, 1893 – Maui parrotbill or kiwikiu
  - Genus Psittirostra – slightly hooked bill, Freycinetia arborea fruit specialist
    - Psittirostra psittacea Gmelin, 1789 – ʻōʻū (probably extinct, 1998?)
  - Genus Rhodacanthis – large-billed, granivorous, legume specialists
    - Rhodacanthis flaviceps Rothschild, 1892 – lesser koa-finch (extinct, 1891)
    - Rhodacanthis forfex James & Olson, 2005 – scissor-billed koa-finch (prehistoric)
    - Rhodacanthis litotes James & Olson, 2005 – primitive koa-finch (prehistoric)
    - Rhodacanthis palmeri Rothschild, 1892 – greater koa-finch (extinct, 1896)
  - Genus Telespiza Wilson, 1890 – finch-like, granivorous, opportunistic scavengers
    - Telespiza cantans Wilson, 1890 – Laysan finch
    - Telespiza persecutrix James & Olson, 1991 – Kauaʻi finch (prehistoric)
    - Telespiza ultima Bryan, 1917 – Nihoa finch
    - Telespiza ypsilon James & Olson, 1991 – Maui Nui finch (prehistoric)
  - Genus Vangulifer – flat rounded bills, possibly caught flying insects
    - Vangulifer mirandus – strange-billed finch (prehistoric)
    - Vangulifer neophasis – thin-billed finch (prehistoric)
  - Genus Viridonia
    - Viridonia sagittirostris Rothschild, 1892 – greater ʻamakihi (extinct, 1901)
  - Genus Xestospiza James & Oslon, 1991 – cone-shaped bills, possibly insectivorous
    - Xestospiza conica James & Olson, 1991 – cone-billed finch (prehistoric)
    - Xestospiza fastigialis James & Olson, 1991 – ridge-billed finch (prehistoric)

Hawaiian honeycreepers were formerly classified into three tribes – Hemignathini, Psittirostrini, and Drepanidini – but they are not currently classified as such.

== Conservation ==
Hawaiian honeycreepers (Fringillidae), of the subfamily Carduelinae, were once quite abundant in all forests throughout Hawai'i. This group of birds historically consisted of at least 51 species. Less than half of Hawaii's previously extant species of honeycreeper still exist. Threats to species include habitat loss, avian malaria, predation by non-native mammals, and competition from non-native birds.

== See also ==
- Hawaiian honeycreeper conservation
- List of adaptive radiated Hawaiian honeycreepers by form

== Other references ==
- Groth, J. G. 1998. Molecular phylogeny of the cardueline finches and Hawaiian honeycreepers. Ostrich, 69: 401.
