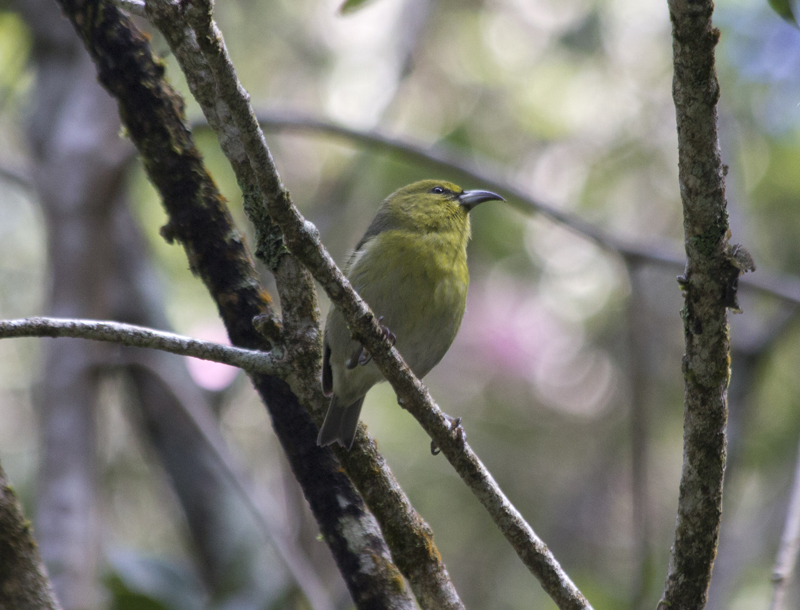

Conservation status
- Endangered (IUCN 3.1)

Scientific classification
- Kingdom: Animalia
- Phylum: Chordata
- Class: Aves
- Order: Passeriformes
- Family: Fringillidae
- Subfamily: Carduelinae
- Genus: Chlorodrepanis
- Species: C. stejnegeri

Binomial name
- Chlorodrepanis stejnegeri (Wilson, SB, 1890)
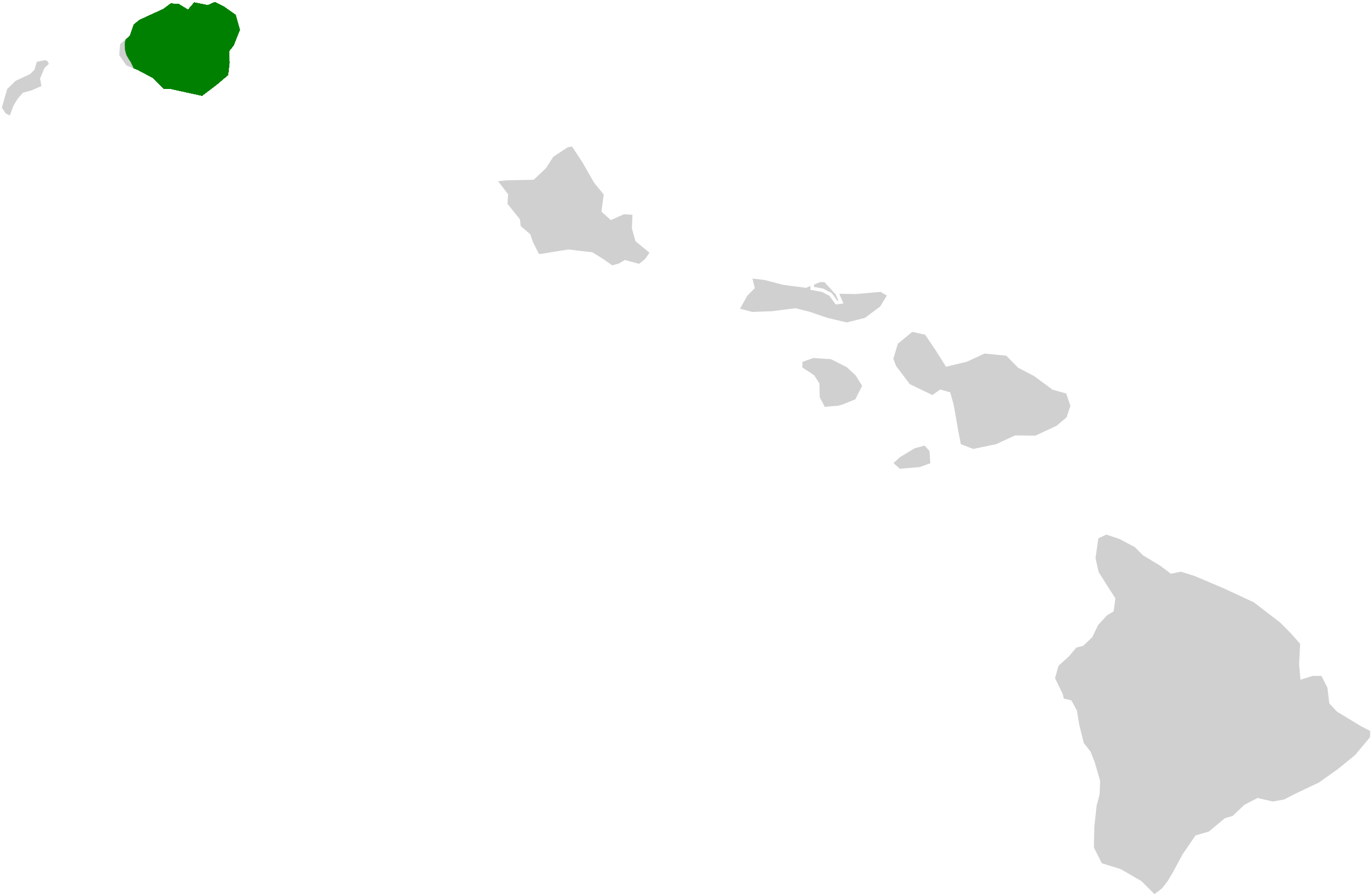

Synonyms
- Viridonia stejnegeri Wilson, 1980; Hemignathus kauaiensis

= Kauaʻi ʻamakihi =

Species of bird

The Kauaʻi ʻamakihi (Chlorodrepanis stejnegeri) is a species of Hawaiian honeycreepers endemic to Kauaʻi in the family Fringillidae. The species Hawaiian name is associated with is Kihikihi, or kihi, which stems from the word amakihi. Kihikihi, meaning curved, makes a reference to the bill of the Kauaʻi ʻamakihi. The Kauaʻi ʻamakihi has similar physical features to an extinct species, the Kauaʻi nukupuʻu . When flying or feeding, the Kaua'i 'amakihi lets out a distinguishing tweet.

== Distribution ==
This species is endemic to the island of Kauaʻi The Kaua'i 'amakihi resides in the higher elevations of the Kaua'i mountains usually above 600 meters in elevation. They previously occurred at lower elevations, but due to the loss of habitat, are now mostly found at elevations higher than 600 meters in mountainous areas. They are known to be around 'ōhi'a and koa trees. They are especially common in ōhi'a trees where they often nest and in ōhi'a forests. They can be spotted at Waimea Canyon, Nā Pali Plateau, Alaka'i Swamp, and Makaleha Mountains.

== Anatomy ==
This species has a greenish-yellow with black lores and a large, sickle-shaped, down curved beak. Males usually have bigger beaks and more color compared to the females which have smaller beaks and a more dull color. More dull feathers and a bigger beaks distinguishes the Kaua'i 'amakihi from the other ʻamakihi species.

== Conservation ==
The Kauaʻi ʻamakihi has been categorized as Endangered by the IUCN. As of 2023, this species has an estimated population of 2,200 – 4,400 mature individuals, which is decreasing. The Kauaʻi ʻamakihi is threatened by habitat loss, invasive species, and diseases such as avian pox and avian malaria.
