= Aidemedia =

Aidemedia Temporal range: Holocene

Scientific classification
- Kingdom: Animalia
- Phylum: Chordata
- Class: Aves
- Order: Passeriformes
- Family: Fringillidae
- Subfamily: Carduelinae
- Genus: †Aidemedia; Olson & James, 1991

Species
- †Aidemedia chascax; †Aidemedia zanclops; †Aidemedia lutetiae

Aidemedia is an extinct genus of Hawaiian honeycreepers known only from sub-fossil remains found on Oahu, Moloka'i and Maui. Based on the shape of their bills, they are theorized to have been insectivorous.

== Species ==
- Sickle-billed gaper (Aidemedia zanclops) - prehistoric
- Maui Nui icterid-like gaper (Aidemedia lutetiae) - prehistoric
- Oahu icterid-like gaper (Aidemedia chascax) - prehistoric

== Taxonomy and etymology ==
Aidemedia was first described by Olson & James in 1991, from sub-fossil remains collected in various caves and lava tubes across Moloka'i, Maui, and Oahu. This genus is named after Joan Aidem, a resident of Moloka'i known for collecting fossil birds.
