= Maui Nui =

Prehistoric Hawaiian island and modern biogeographic region

Coordinates: 21.1365°N 157.214°W

Location of Maui County within the U.S. state of Hawaii

Maui Nui is a modern geologists' name given to a prehistoric Hawaiian island and the corresponding modern biogeographic region. Maui Nui is composed of four modern islands: Maui, Molokaʻi, Lānaʻi, and Kahoʻolawe. Administratively, the four modern islands comprise Maui County (and a tiny part of Molokaʻi called Kalawao County). Long after the breakup of Maui Nui, the four modern islands retained plant and animal life similar to each other. Thus, Maui Nui is not only a prehistoric island but also a modern biogeographic region.

== Geology ==
Synopsis of Maui Nui's submergence history, showing the extent of Maui Nui landmass at times indicated. "Ma" means "millions of years ago." Light and dark shading show the extent of land during low and high sea stands of glacial cycles. The panel labeled "Recent" represents the latest glacial cycle; the low sea stand for that period occurred about 18,000 years ago.

Maui Nui formed and broke up during the Pleistocene Epoch, which lasted from about 2.58 million to 11,700 years ago.

Maui Nui is built from seven shield volcanoes. The three oldest are Penguin Bank, West Molokaʻi, and East Molokaʻi, which probably range from slightly over to slightly less than 2 million years old. The four younger volcanoes are Lāna'i, West Maui, Kaho'olawe, and Haleakalā, which probably formed between 1.5 and 2 million years ago.

At its prime 1.2 million years ago, Maui Nui was 14,600 square kilometres (5,600 sq mi), 50% larger than today's Hawaiʻi Island. The island of Maui Nui included four modern islands (Maui, Molokaʻi, Lānaʻi, and Kahoʻolawe) and landmass west of Molokaʻi called Penguin Bank, which is now completely submerged.

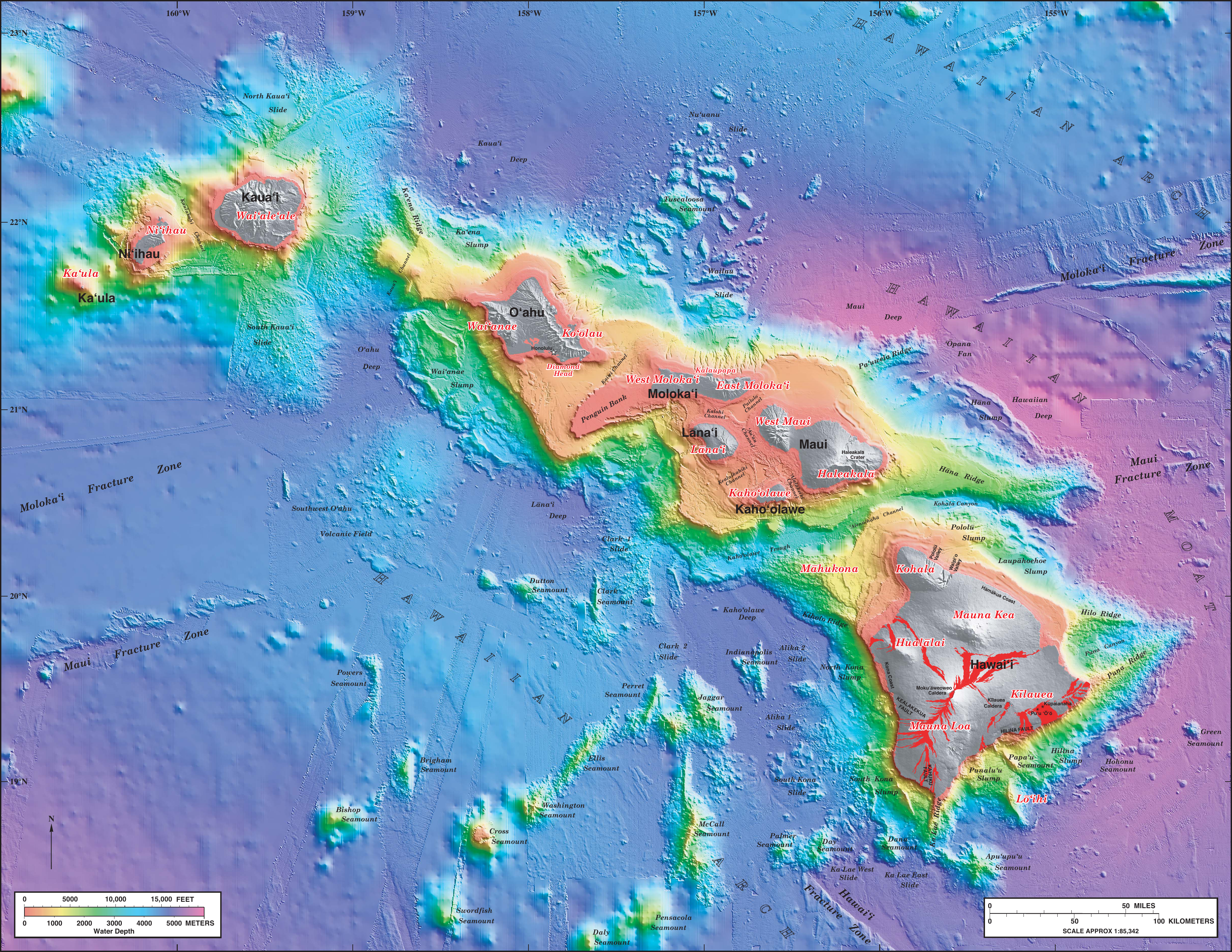
Bathymetry image of the Hawaiian Islands, with Oʻahu and Maui Nui at center

Maui Nui broke up as rising sea levels flooded the connections between the volcanoes. The breakup was complex because global sea levels rose and fell intermittently during the Quaternary glaciation. About 600,000 years ago, the connection between Molokaʻi and the island of Lāna'i/Maui/Kahoʻolawe became intermittent. About 400,000 years ago, the connection between Lāna'i and Maui/Kahoʻolawe also became intermittent. The connection between Maui and Kahoʻolawe was permanently broken between 200,000 and 150,000 years ago. Maui, Lāna'i, and Molokaʻi were connected intermittently thereafter, most recently about 18,000 years ago during the Last Glacial Maximum.

Today, the sea floor between these four islands is relatively shallow, about 500 metres (1,600 ft) deep. At the outer edges of former Maui Nui, as at the edges of all Hawaiian Islands, the sea floor plummets to the abyssal plain of the Pacific Ocean.

== Biogeography ==
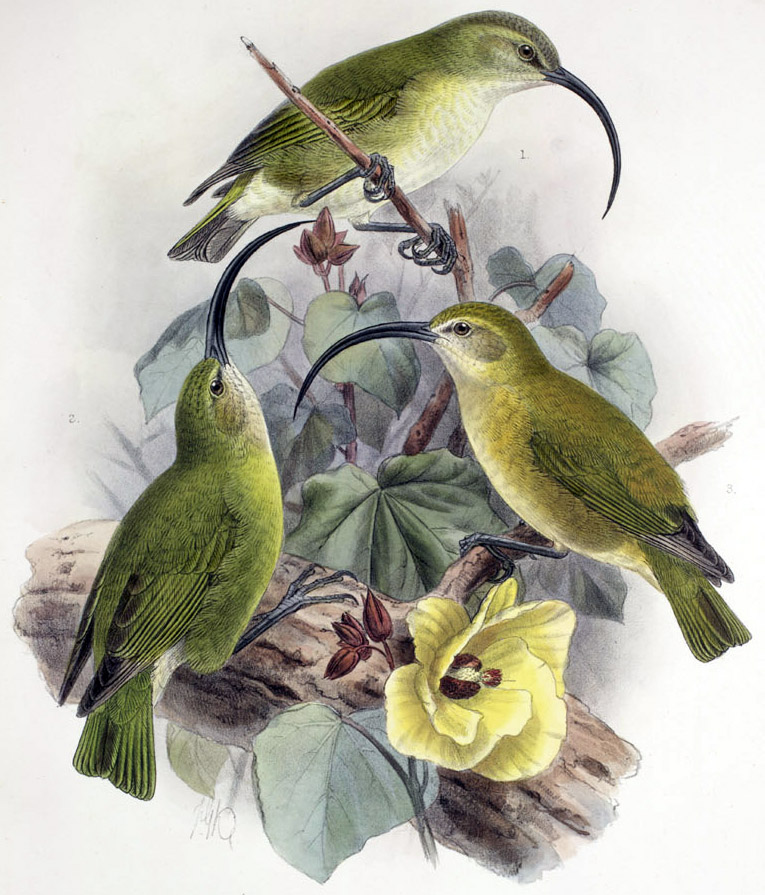
The Maui Nui ʻakialoa (Akialoa lanaiensis)

The term Maui Nui is also used as a modern biogeographic region of Hawaii. Long after the breakup of Maui Nui, the four modern islands retained similar plant and animal life. Many plant and animal species occur across multiple islands of former Maui Nui but are found nowhere else in Hawaii.

Many of Hawaii's native species declined or became extinct after Polynesian arrival or in the modern era, making the study of Hawaiian biogeography more complicated. Among Hawaii's native birds, the ʻākohekohe (Palmeria dolei) only survives on Maui, but it also occurred on Molokaʻi until 1907. The black mamo (Drepanis funerea) was historically documented only on Molokaʻi until its extinction in 1907, but fossils are also known from Maui. The Maui Nui icterid-like gaper (Aidemedia lutetiae) was never documented historically, but fossils are known from Maui and Molokaʻi. Among Hawaii's native plants, the maui hala pepe (Dracaena rockii) is known from Maui and Molokaʻi, and survives on both islands. Pua ʻala (Brighamia rockii) survives only on Molokaʻi, but was historically documented on Maui and Lāna'i. Additional examples of plants and animals endemic to the Maui Nui region appear in List of Hawaiian animals extinct in the Holocene and Endemism in the Hawaiian Islands.

Conversely, the ʻelepaio (genus Chasiempis) have a disjunct distribution. These birds occur on Hawaiʻi Island, Oʻahu, and Kauaʻi, but are curiously absent from the islands of former Maui Nui (both currently and in the fossil record).

Some bird species use the term "Maui Nui" in their common names, such as the Maui Nui large-billed moa-nalo (Thambetochen chauliodous), Maui Nui icterid-like gaper (Aidemedia lutetiae), Maui Nui ʻakialoa (Akialoa lanaiensis), Maui Nui ʻalauahio (Paroreomyza montana), and Maui Nui finch (Telespiza ypsilon). All of these species survived for thousands of years after the breakup of Maui Nui, and the Maui population of the Maui Nui ʻalauahio survives to the present. Thus, Maui Nui is not just a prehistoric island but also a modern biogeographic region.

== See also ==
- Santa Rosae – Ancient landmass off Southern California
- List of Hawaiian animals extinct in the Holocene
- Endemism in the Hawaiian Islands
