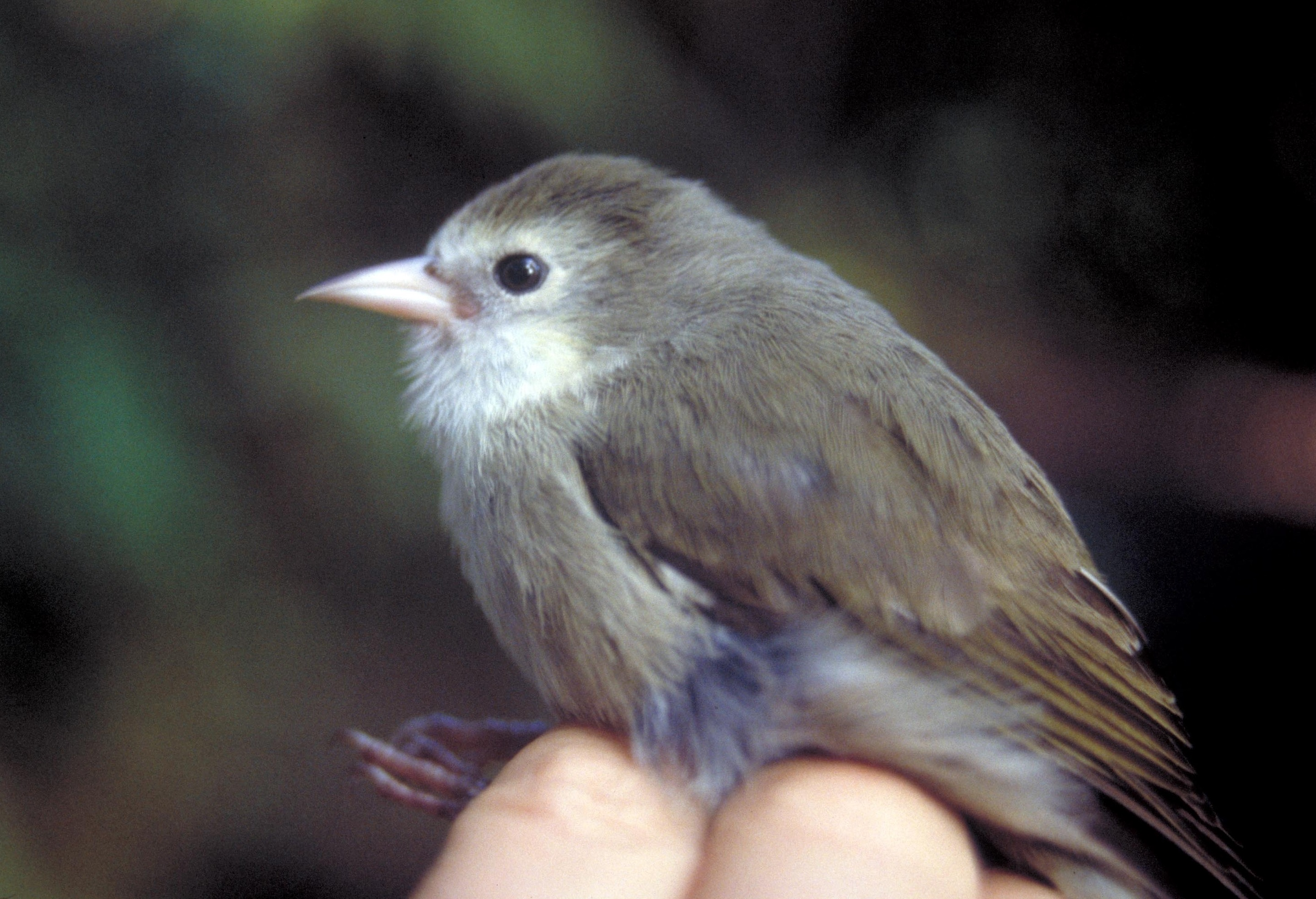

Conservation status
- Critically Endangered (IUCN 3.1)

Scientific classification
- Kingdom: Animalia
- Phylum: Chordata
- Class: Aves
- Order: Passeriformes
- Family: Fringillidae
- Subfamily: Carduelinae
- Genus: Oreomystis; Stejneger, 1903
- Species: O. bairdi

Binomial name
- Oreomystis bairdi (Stejneger, 1887)
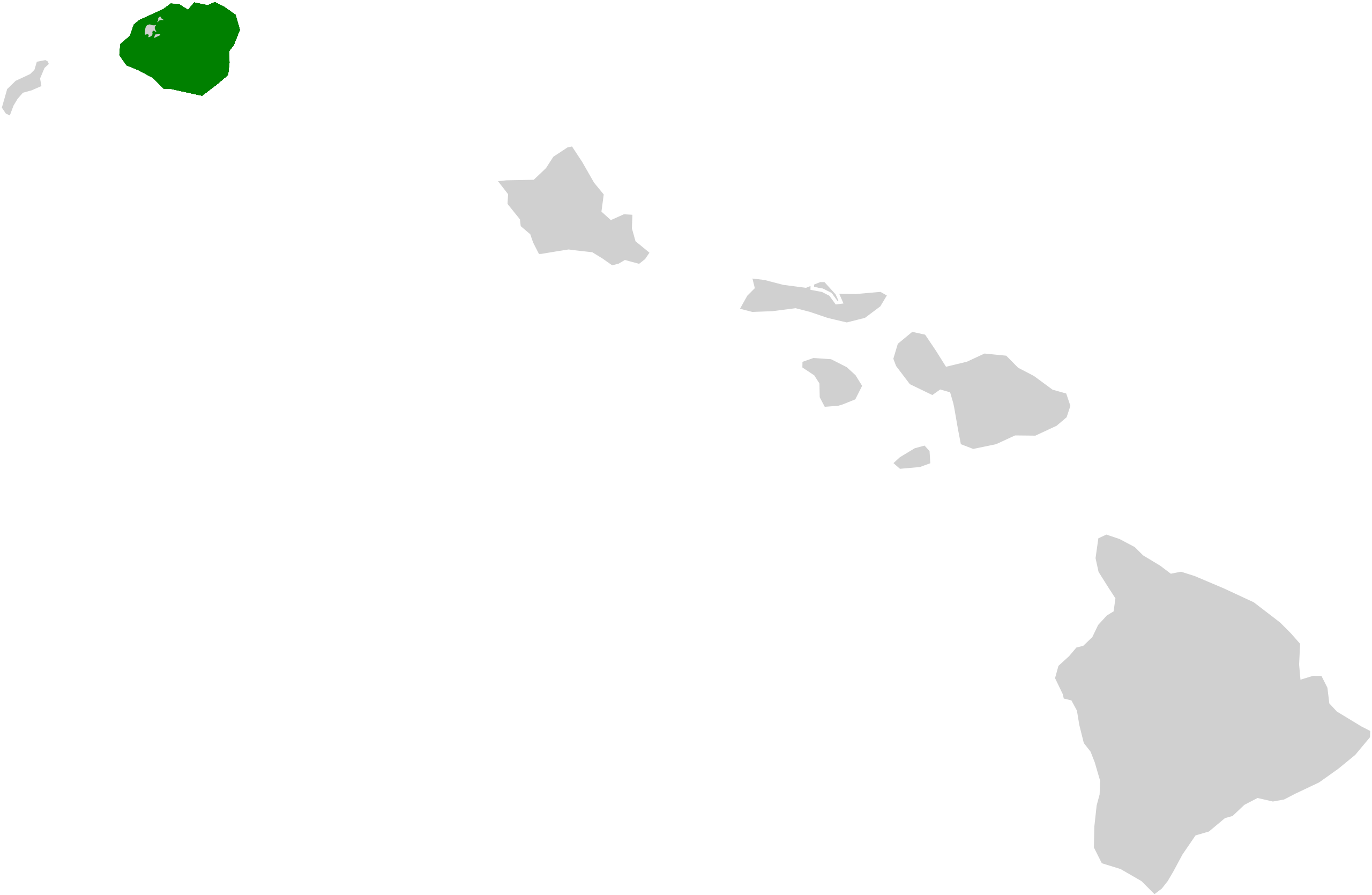

= ʻAkikiki =

Species of bird

The ʻakikiki (pronounced /ˌækiˈkiːki/) (Oreomystis bairdi), also called the Kauaʻi creeper, is a critically endangered Hawaiian honeycreeper endemic to Kauaʻi, Hawaiʻi. It is the only member of the genus Oreomystis. Of the Hawaiian birds known to be extant, it is thought to be the most endangered, with only 454 wild individuals reported as of 2018. A survey report in 2021 estimated the population at 45 with a 5 percent annual decrease, in July 2023 the remaining number of wild birds was estimated to be just 5 individuals. Pakele, the last known wild ʻakikiki, was last seen on August 29, 2025; she was honored as the last wild member of her species.

== Taxonomy ==
Although the taxonomic affinities of Oreomystis remain uncertain, some phylogenetic evidence indicates that it is most closely allied with the ʻalauahios (Paroreomyza). Together, they form the second most basal recent lineage within the Hawaiian honeycreepers aside from the recently extinct poʻouli (Melamprosops phaeosoma), and the most basal extant lineage. However, other studies support it being slightly more derived than Paroreomyza.

== Description ==
The ʻakikiki is small (13 cm length; 12-17 g mass), with gray plumage above and white below. It is not sexually dimorphic. Juveniles have large white eye rings; adults may retain a pale eyebrow for several years. Legs and bill are pink. The tail is short compared to other birds on Kauaʻi, giving it a stocky appearance.

== Vocalizations ==
The adult contact call is a short weet or whit, sometimes doubled. The call may also resemble that of the ʻanianiau, with which it may flock. Its song, heard only in breeding season, is a descending trill. The juvenile breeding call is a stuttering series of chits. During the breeding season, females use a similar call to solicit feeding by males.

== Distribution and habitat ==
It is currently found only in the highest elevation native rainforests of Kokeʻe State Park and the Alakaʻi Wilderness Preserve on Kauaʻi. Subfossil records indicate that it was once found at sea level as well, and thus may have inhabited a wider range of habitats, including dry forest.

== Diet and foraging behavior ==
The ʻakikiki is often compared to the nuthatches of North America because it forages by hopping along the trunks and branches of both live and dead trees, picking off arthropods. ʻAkikiki often forage in pairs, family groups, or mixed-species flocks.

== Breeding ==
Few ʻakikiki nests have been found. Nesting occurs from March to June, with both males and females constructing nests of moss and lichen several meters up in the crowns of ʻohiʻa trees. Only the female incubates the eggs, but both parents feed the nestlings and fledglings. The long juvenile dependency period means only a single brood per pair is typically raised each breeding season.

In 2018, the first ʻakikiki was bred in captivity with the assistance of the San Diego Zoo.

== Threats ==
The ʻakikiki's habitat has been reduced to a fragment of its former range by deforestation and deterioration by invasive species. The greatest current threat is thought to be Avian malaria, to which most Hawaiian honeycreepers have little immunity. The disease historically affected birds below approximately 1000 m elevation, restricting the ʻakikiki's range. Yet with increasing temperatures on the island, the prevalence of malaria has steadily increased even at the highest elevations on Kauaʻi. Introduced rats are thought to be major predators of eggs and nestlings. Competition for food and space with non-native birds, such as Japanese white-eye, may also affect its numbers.

== Conservation ==
The ʻakikiki has been listed as critically endangered on the IUCN Red List since 2000. It has been a candidate for listing as an endangered species under the Endangered Species Act since 1993, but was not listed as such until 2010. Because little is known about this species, the primary focus of recovery efforts so far have been estimating the population size and understanding its basic biology. Captive breeding, reintroduction, and habitat restoration are planned.

An extremely steep decline was noted between 2018 and 2021 in Halehaha, one of the species' former strongholds, with the population declining from 70 to 5 individuals, leaving only 45 wild individuals overall. This decline is likely primarily due to climate change allowing the mosquitoes carrying avian malaria to invade higher elevations. In addition, it has been predicted that at the current decline rate, the species will likely go extinct in the wild by 2023. About 41 captive individuals exist, although only a limited number of offspring have been produced. It is currently planned to keep a significant number of ʻakikiki in captivity until landscape-scale control of mosquitoes using Wolbachia can be performed starting in 2024 at the earliest, after which the birds could be reintroduced to their habitat.

In May 2015, a high-school teacher in Tamil Nadu, India named Prakash Vaithyanathan suggested that the International Astronomical Union name a celestial body Akikiki during the 2015 IAU General Assembly conducted in Hawaii. After much consideration, asteroid number 7613 was officially named 7613 ʻAkikiki.
