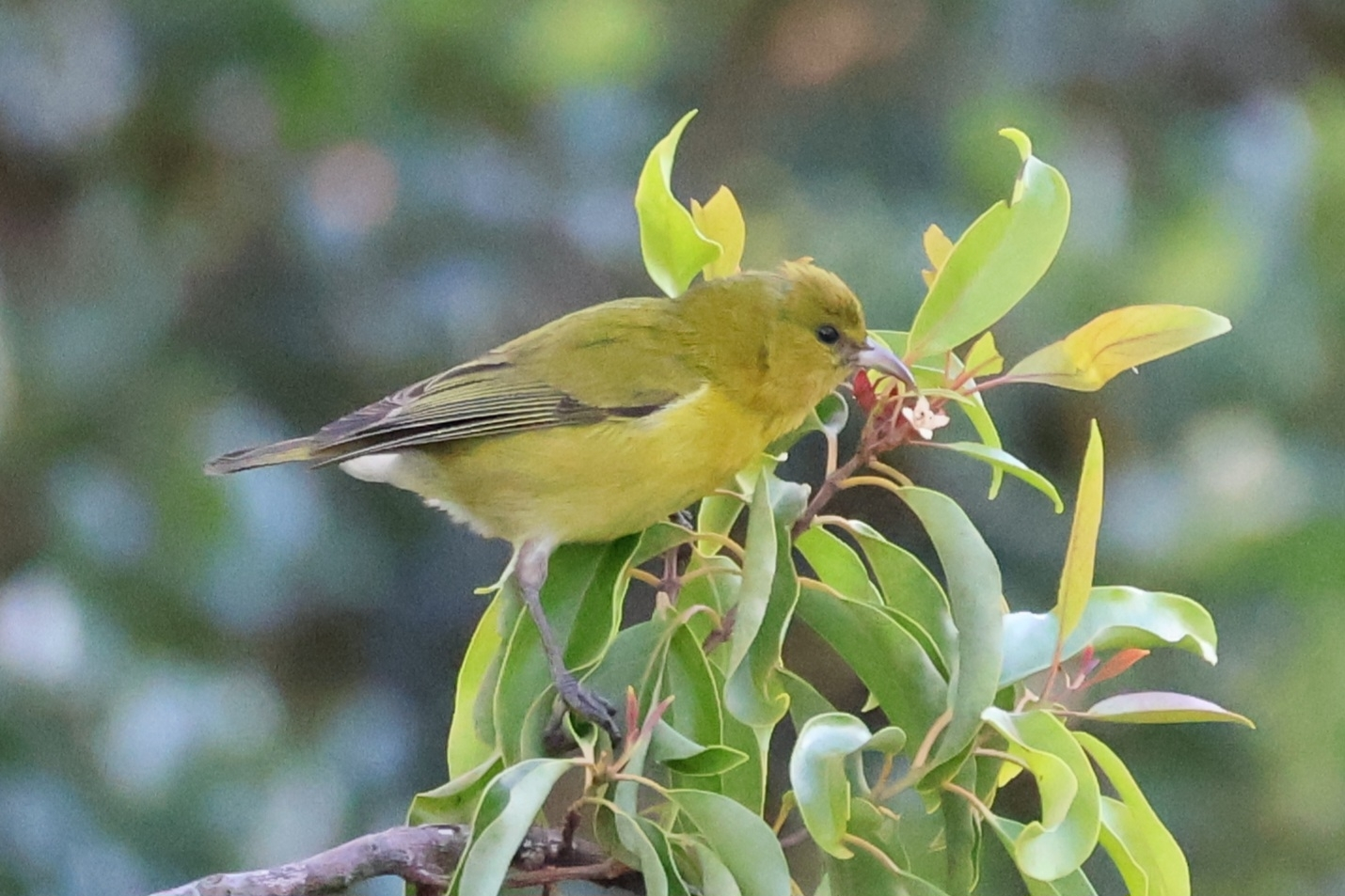

Conservation status
- Near Threatened (IUCN 3.1)

Scientific classification
- Kingdom: Animalia
- Phylum: Chordata
- Class: Aves
- Order: Passeriformes
- Family: Fringillidae
- Subfamily: Carduelinae
- Genus: Chlorodrepanis
- Species: C. flava

Binomial name
- Chlorodrepanis flava (Bloxam, 1827)
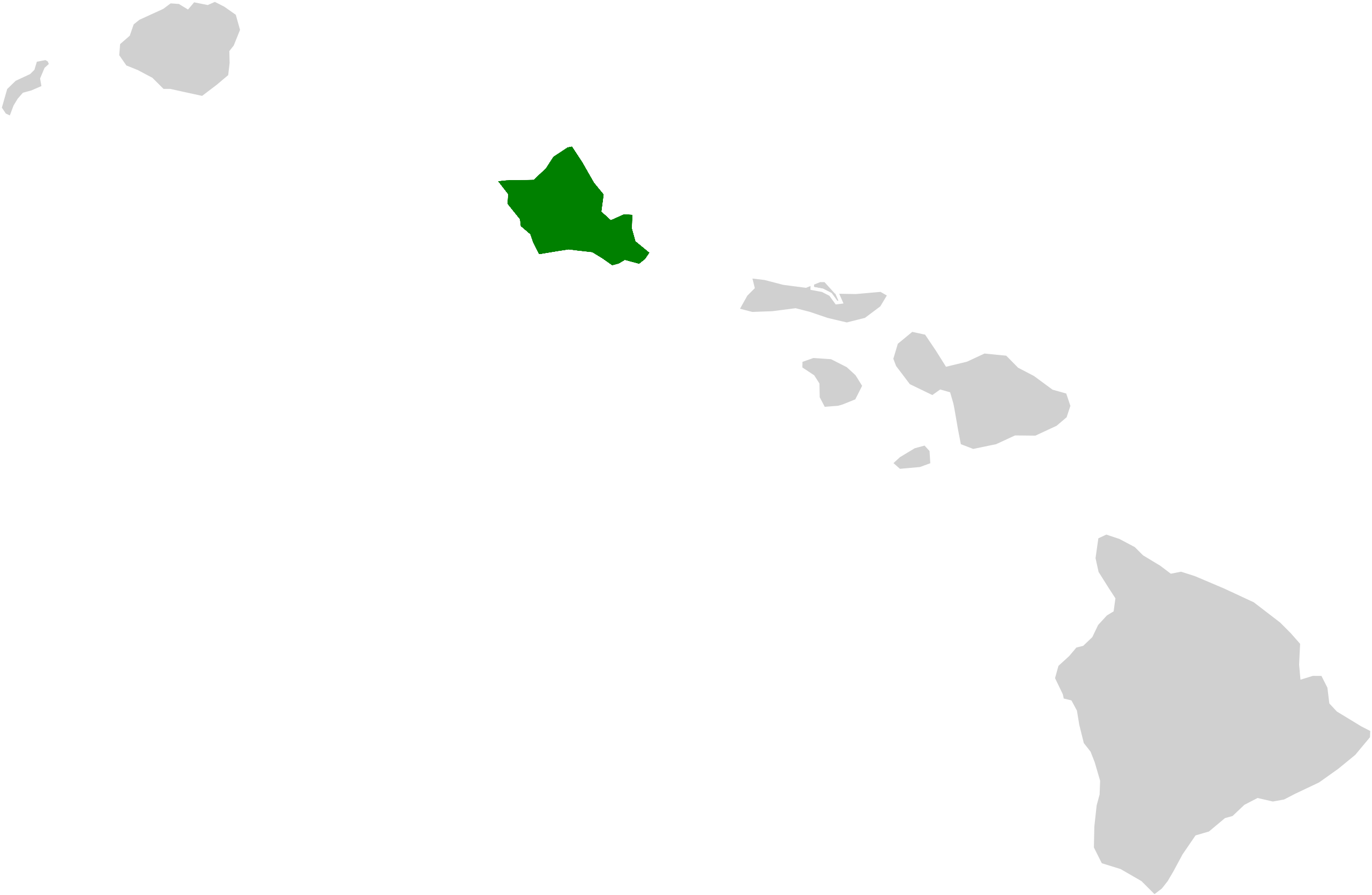

Synonyms
- Hemignathus flavus

= Oʻahu ʻamakihi =

Species of bird

The Oʻahu ʻamakihi (Chlorodrepanis flava) is a species of Hawaiian honeycreeper in the family Fringillidae. The male is rich yellow below, sharply contrasted with greenish upper parts. Females are duller and have two prominent wing-bars. It has a total length of approximately 4.5 inches (11 cm). It is endemic to the island of Oʻahu in Hawaiʻi, and is likely the only surviving honeycreeper endemic to the island.

== Taxonomy ==
The Oʻahu ʻamakihi was first named by Andrew Bloxam (as Nectarina flava). He saw it and collected specimens from Oʻahu while in the Hawaiian Islands in 1825 as the naturalist on board HMS Blonde.

The species was formerly placed in the genus Hemignathus but was assigned to Chlorodrepanis based on the phylogenetic analysis of mitochondrial and nuclear DNA sequences.

== Habitat ==
It tends to stay in the wetter southern area of Oʻahu, and in the valley near Wahiawa and Mililani. It can easily be spotted in two major parks, the Honouliuli Preserve, and the Wa'ahila Ridge State Recreation Area. It tends to stay in forest, but has - at least to some extent - adapted to non-native forest types. It will nest and forage in wooded urban areas, but prefers native habitats where koa (Acacia koa) dominates. It mainly occurs at altitudes above 1,650 feet (500 m), but in some valleys in parts of its range it occurs lower.

== Diet ==
Due to its bill shape, it is able to scrape off pieces of bark and reach insects that make up all of the protein in its diet. It drinks nectar from ʻōhiʻa lehua (Metrosideros polymorpha) trees and in rare cases it will use sugar feeders.

== Breeding ==
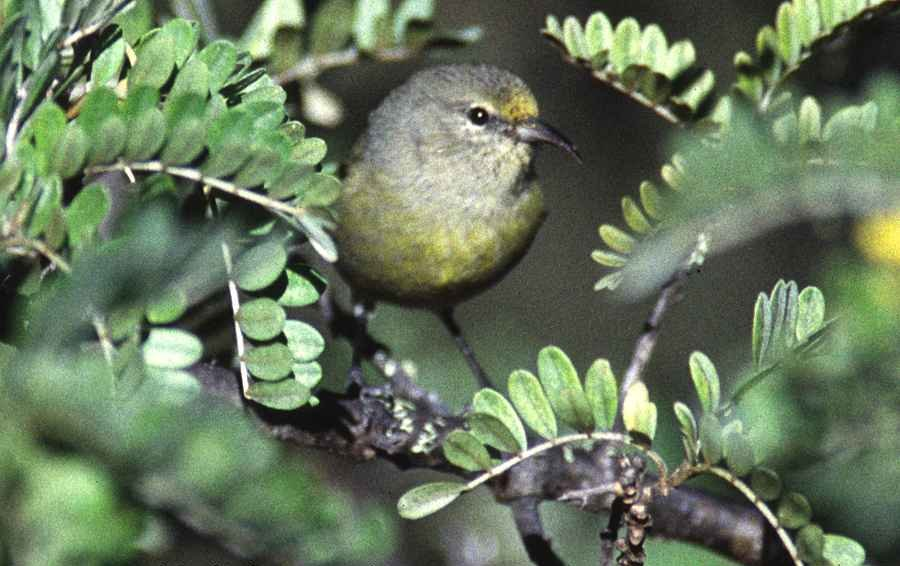
Female/immature ʻamakihi, displaying duller plumage.

The birds pair off during the breeding season, which occurs from mid-December to early March. The small nest is 2–4 inches (5.1–10.2 cm) wide. The female lays one to two eggs. In two weeks the eggs hatch, with the hatchlings covered in brown down feathers. The birds are ready leave the nest three weeks later.

== Threats ==
It is threatened by habitat loss, introduced predators and avian malaria. Some populations, however, appear to have developed a level of resistance to avian malaria, which might explain its recent expansion into lowland areas where mosquitoes - the vector of this disease - are more common. Overall, it appears far less threatened than several other Hawaiian honeycreeper, as also reflected by its status as vulnerable.
