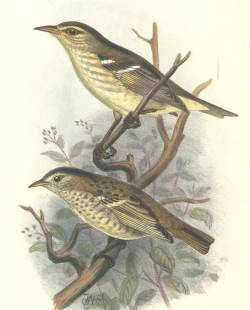
- Oʻahu ʻalauahio (Paroreomyza maculata)

Scientific classification
- Kingdom: Animalia
- Phylum: Chordata
- Class: Aves
- Order: Passeriformes
- Family: Fringillidae
- Subfamily: Carduelinae
- Genus: Paroreomyza; Perkins, 1901

Type species
- Himatione maculata Cabanis, 1851

Species
- See text

= Paroreomyza =

Genus of birds

Paroreomyza is a genus of Hawaiian honeycreeper in the subfamily Carduelinae of the family Fringillidae. These birds are endemic to Hawaii.

== Taxonomy ==
Paroreomyza, along with Oreomystis (although their alliance is disputed), is the second most basal genus of Hawaiian honeycreeper to survive to recent times, with the most basal being the recently extinct poʻouli (Melamprosops phaeosoma), with Paroreomyza and Oreomystis having diverged from the rest of the lineage about 4.7 million years ago. Members of Paroreomyza do not have two key phenotypic traits present in Oreomystis and the more derived Hawaiian honeycreepers: a distinct musty odor and a squared-off tongue. Following the extinction of the poʻouli, it (along with Oreomystis if they are considered sister genera) is the most basal group of Hawaiian honeycreepers still surviving, although it too has lost most of its species.

== Species ==
It includes the following three species, of which the Maui Nui ʻalauahio is divided into two subspecies:

Image	Common name	Scientific name
	†Kākāwahie	†Paroreomyza flammea — extinct (1963)
	†Oʻahu ʻalauahio	†Paroreomyza maculata — probably extinct (late 1960s to mid 1980s?)
	Maui Nui ʻalauahio: †Lanaʻi ʻalauahio; Maui ʻalauahio	Paroreomyza montana: †Paroreomyza montana montana — extinct (1937); Paroreomyza montana newtoni

== See also ==
- Hawaiian honeycreepers
- Endemic fauna of Hawaii
- Extinct birds of Hawaii
