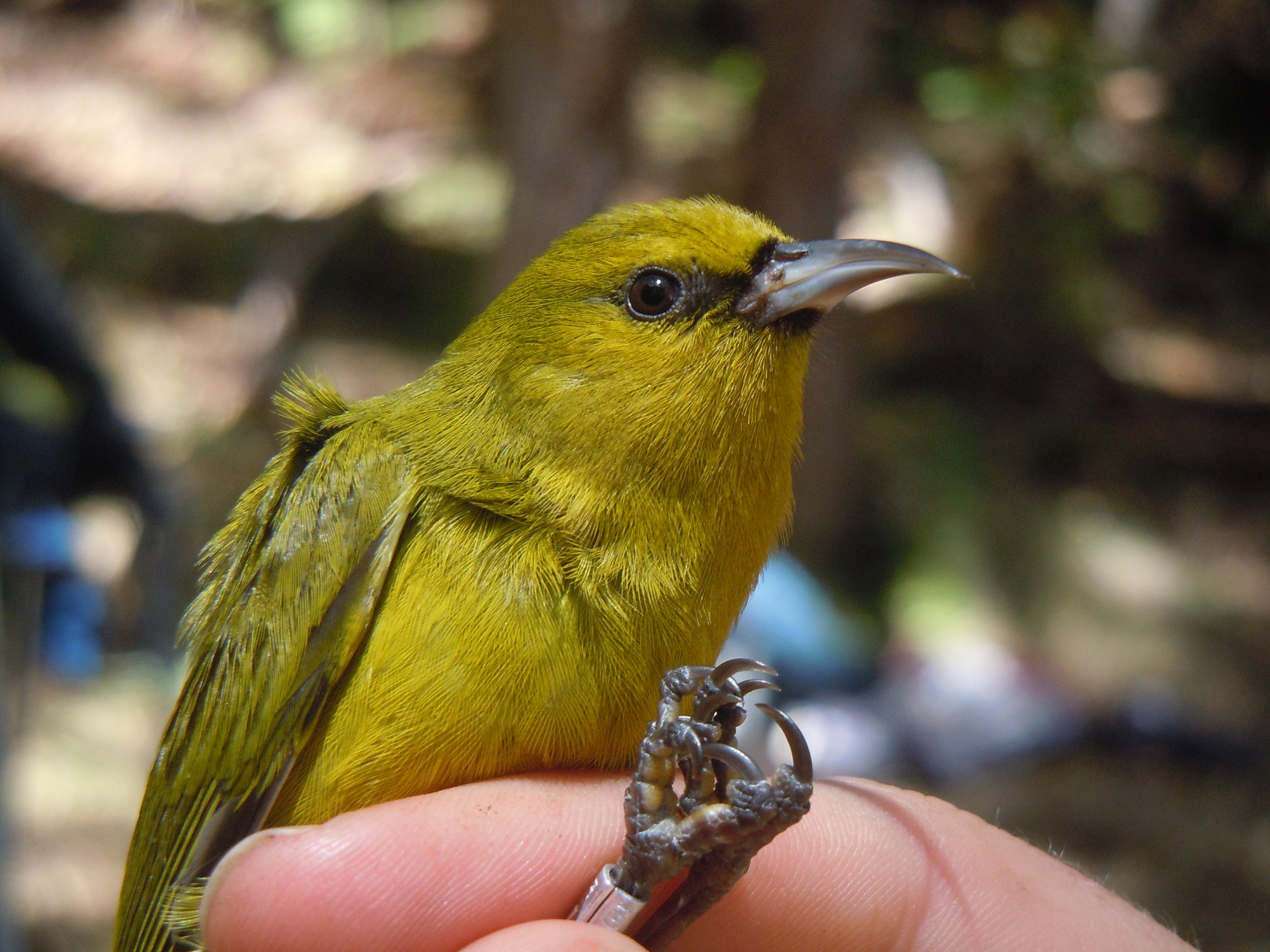
- Hawaiʻi ʻamakihi (Chlorodrepanis virens)

Scientific classification
- Kingdom: Animalia
- Phylum: Chordata
- Class: Aves
- Order: Passeriformes
- Family: Fringillidae
- Subfamily: Carduelinae
- Genus: Chlorodrepanis; Perkins, 1899

Type species
- Himatione stejnegeri S.B. Wilson, 1890

Species
- See text

= Chlorodrepanis =

Genus of birds

Chlorodrepanis is a genus of Hawaiian honeycreeper in the subfamily Carduelinae of the family Fringillidae.

The birds are endemic to Hawaii.

== Species ==
It contains the following species:

Image	Scientific name	Common name	Distribution
	Chlorodrepanis virens	Hawaiʻi ʻamakihi or common ʻamakihi	Hawaiʻi, Maui, Molokaʻi, and (formerly) Lānaʻi,
	Chlorodrepanis flava	Oʻahu ʻamakihi	Oʻahu
	Chlorodrepanis stejnegeri	Kauaʻi ʻamakihi	Kauaʻi.

== See also ==
- Hawaiian honeycreepers
- Endemic fauna of Hawaii
