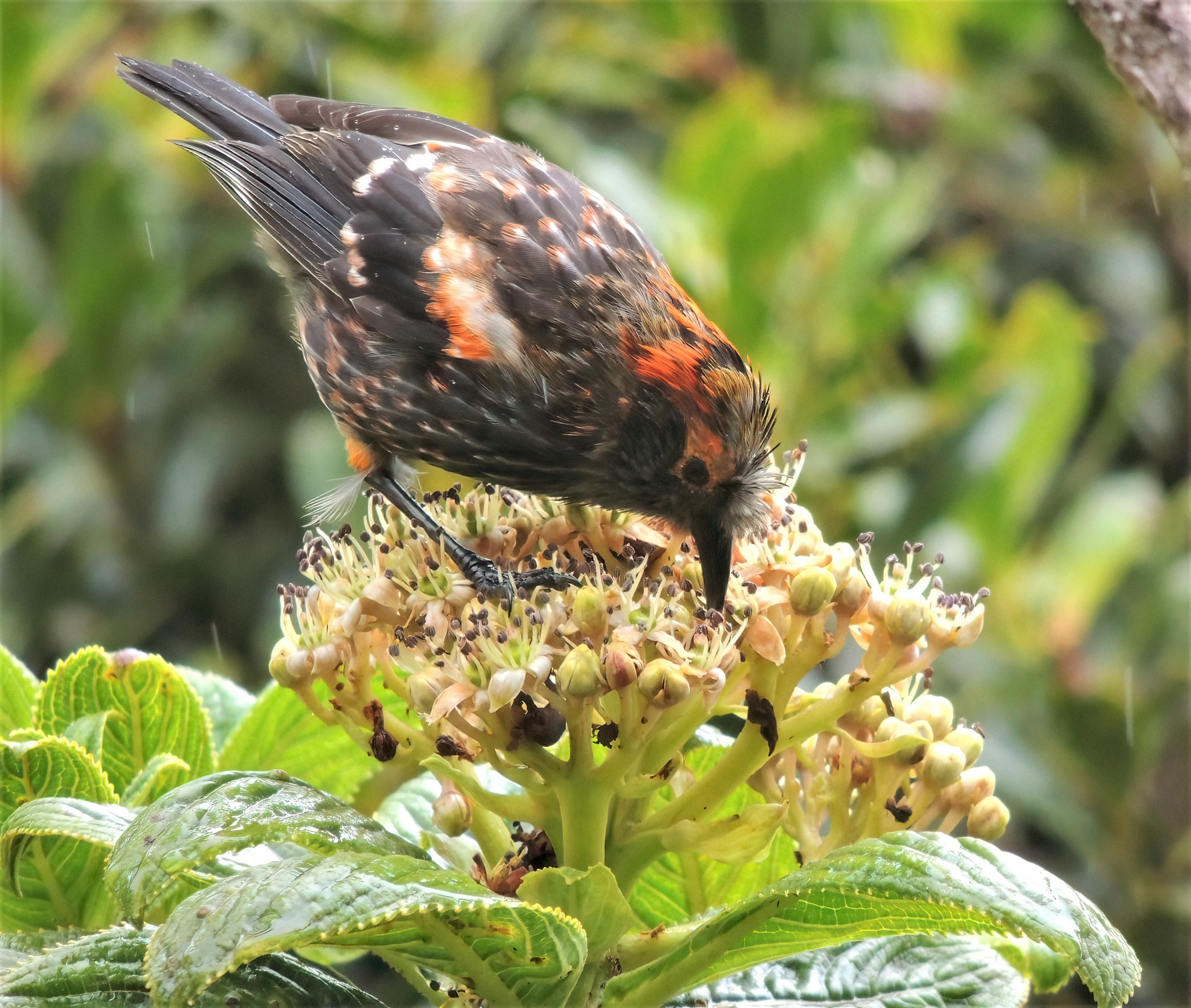

Conservation status
- Critically Endangered (IUCN 3.1)

Scientific classification
- Kingdom: Animalia
- Phylum: Chordata
- Class: Aves
- Order: Passeriformes
- Family: Fringillidae
- Subfamily: Carduelinae
- Genus: Palmeria; Rothschild, 1893
- Species: P. dolei

Binomial name
- Palmeria dolei (Wilson, SB, 1891)
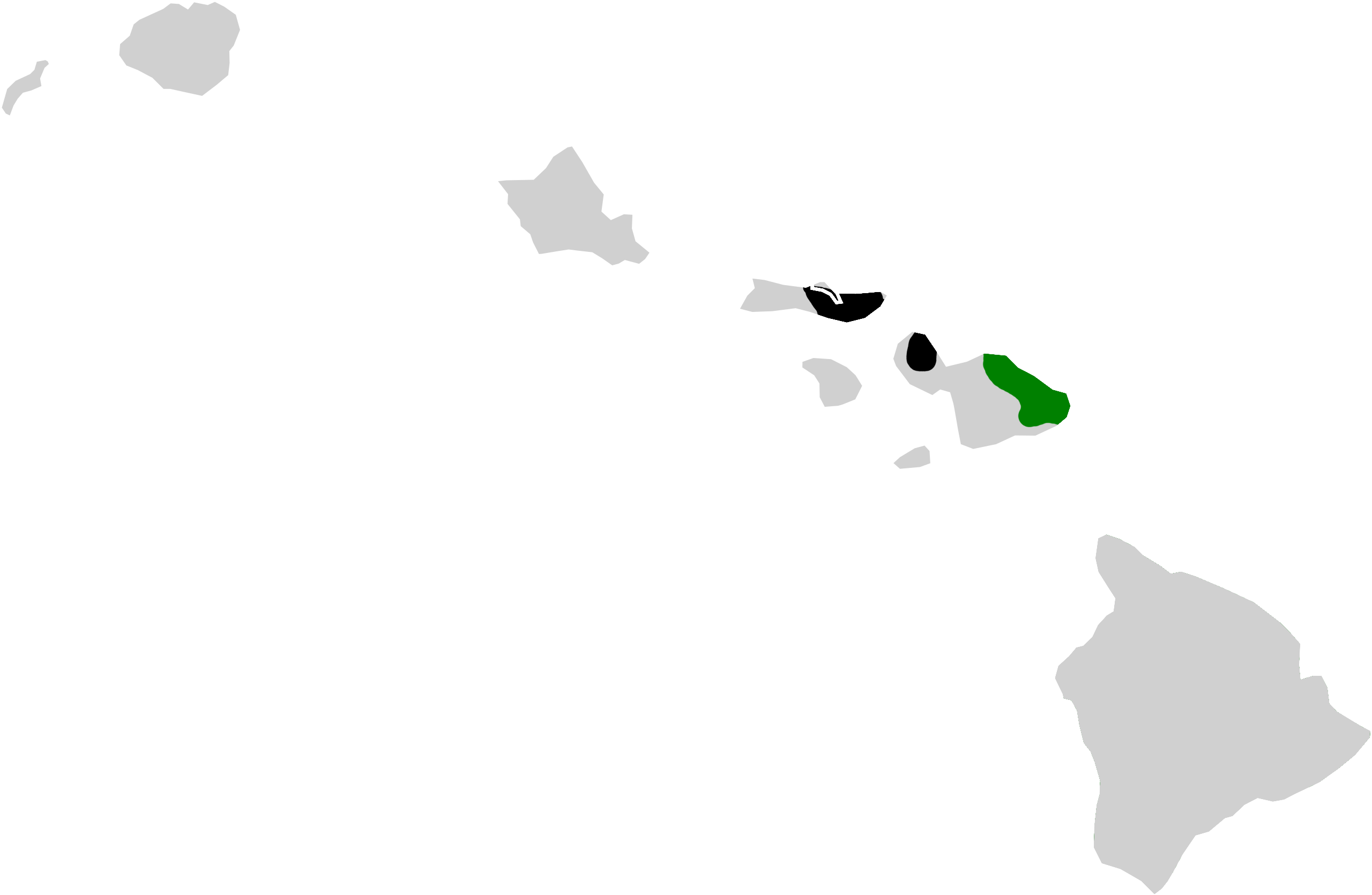
- Black: Extinct; Green: Current range

= ʻAkohekohe =

ʻĀkohekohe

Species of bird

The ʻākohekohe (Palmeria dolei), or crested honeycreeper, is a species of Hawaiian honeycreeper. It is endemic to the island of Maui in Hawaiʻi. The ʻākohekohe is susceptible to mosquito‐transmitted avian malaria (Plasmodium relictum) and only breeds in high‐elevation wet forests (> 1,715 m or 5,630 ft).

== Description ==
The ʻākohekohe (pronounced "ah ko-hay ko-hay") is the largest honeycreeper on Maui, at 6.5 to 7 inches (17 to 18 cm) in length. The adults are a glossy black with whitish feathers and stripes going down its side. The underparts are whitish black while the top has orange feathers sticking from wings. The feathers behind the eyes are a reddish color, and have a stream of cream colored feathers coming from the eyes. One of the things that most people recognize about this bird is its whitish gold colored feather crest on its head. The younger birds are brownish black and they do not have the orange feathers of the parents. The legs and bills are a blackish color.

=== Song ===
It has a variety of songs. The most well known of the calls is a pair of whee-o, whee-o, being repeated over and over again. Also another well known song is a descending thrill which is done about five seconds apart. It songs include a low chuckling sound, tjook, tjook, chouroup or a rarer song, hur-hur-hur-gluk-gluk-gluk.

=== Diet ===
The ʻākohekohe is a nectarivore that feeds on the flowers of ʻōhiʻa lehua (Metrosideros polymorpha) high up in the canopy. It is an aggressive bird and will drive away competing nectarivores, such as the related ʻapapane and ʻiʻiwi. When ʻōhiʻa lehua blossoms are limited, it will eat insects, fruit, and nectar from other plants. The ʻākohekohe will forage in the understory if necessary, where food plants include ʻākala (Rubus hawaiensis).

=== Habitat and distribution ===
Its natural habitat is wet forests dominated by koa (Acacia koa) and ʻōhiʻa lehua (Metrosideros polymorpha) on the windward side of Haleakalā at elevations of 4,200 to 7,100 feet (1,300 to 2,200 m). During a search for the species in the east Maui forests, there were a record of 415 observations over an area of 11,000 acres (45 km^{2}) and at elevations from 4,200 to 7,100 feet (1,300 to 2,200 m) above sea level. It has been estimated that there are a total of 3,800 ʻākohekohe left on Maui in two populations separated by the Koʻolau Gap. They are sometimes but rarely seen at Hosmer Grove in Haleakalā National Park.

== Threats ==
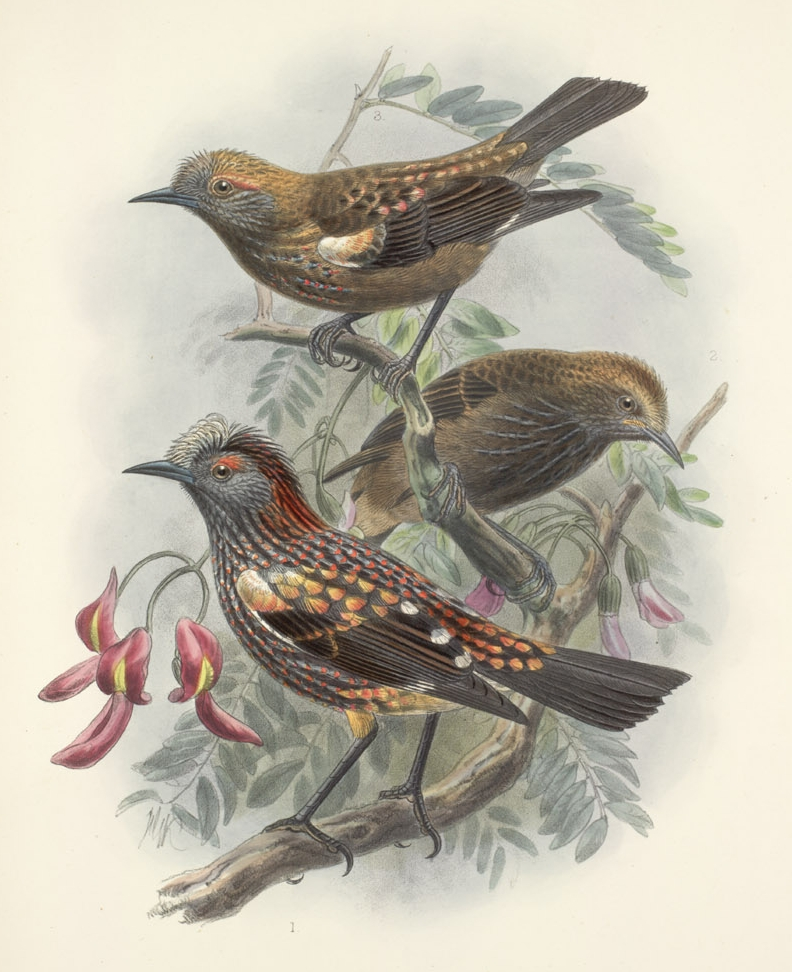
Illustration by John Gerrard Keulemans

The ʻākohekohe currently survives only on Maui, but also lived on the eastern side of the island of Molokaʻi until 1907. This bird was common on both islands at the start of the 20th century. It was thought to be extinct after that—however, in 1945 a small population was discovered in the National Area Reserve on Haleakalā in Maui. Over the course of the millennia, the population has decreased. The first human settlement of Hawaiʻi by Polynesians led to considerable habitat loss and ecological changes such as deforestation for human settlements and agriculture, particularly in lowland areas. The Polynesian rat (Rattus exulans) was also introduced to the islands at this time, which was a significant component of habitat loss and species decline. When Europeans arrived, the land and habitat loss and extinctions accelerated. Europeans brought with them two additional species of rats, which predated eggs, chicks, and adults of many bird species, and introduced ungulates which caused further deforestation. Another factor that lead to the decline of the ʻākohekohe was its unusual appearance, which made it desirable to collectors. In the mid-1800s, mosquitoes were introduced to the Hawaiian Islands, and later, mosquito-transmitted diseases such as avian malaria and avian pox. Mosquitoes, particularly Culex quinquefasciatus, are vectors for these diseases. Hawaiian honeycreepers such as Palmeria dolei lack natural resistance to these pathogens and because of this avian malaria has a high mortality rate among Hawaiian honeycreepers. Humans also released invasive birds which compete with native birds for resources, and can also operate as vectors for avian malaria and other diseases to which they are resistant.

== Conservation ==
According to the Federal Endangered Species Act, this bird is protected by law along with its habitat. The bird was included in the act in March 1967. It was also a part of many other documents including the Maui-Molokai Forest Bird Recovery Plan in 1967, by the Fish and Wildlife Service. It will serve as a guideline to protect the indigenous life of Maui and Molokaʻi. The final recovery plan in 1984 continues the last, keeping eyes on the species and eradicating any ungulates that are introduced into the area that can harm and or disturb the ʻākohekohe and other native forest birds in Maui's forests.
