= Scott Barchard Wilson =

British ornithologist (1864-1923)

Scott Barchard Wilson (29 May 1864 – 20 January 1923) was a British ornithologist who is known for the collection and study of Hawaiian birds.

== Life ==
Scott Barchard Wilson was the eldest son of the chemist George Fergusson Wilson (1822–1902) and Ellen Barchard (1825–1915). The family home was near Weybridge in Surrey. His siblings were Herman George Wilson (1866–1942) and Alice Charlotte Wilson (1870–1933).

Wilson was educated at Marlborough College in Wiltshire and then at the age of 19 was admitted to Magdalene College, Cambridge. He never graduated.

On 10 August 1920, at the age of 56, he married Emma Amelia [Clements] Keates. Emma had previously married William Belcher Keates on 29 February 1916. On 20 January 1923 Wilson committed suicide at his home in Lymington, Hampshire.

== Ornithology ==
In 1887, he made the first of three voyages to study and collect birds in Hawaii. Based on these trips he wrote Aves Hawaiienses (1890–1899) with Arthur Humble Evans. It was published in seven parts and illustrated by Frederick William Frohawk.

Wilson formally described eleven currently recognised bird species, of which four are now extinct and one is possibly extinct:

- Olomao (Myadestes lanaiensis) (possibly extinct)
- † Kakawahie (Paroreomyza flammea) (extinct)
- Maui alauahio (Paroreomyza montana)
- Laysan finch (Telespiza cantans)
- † Kona grosbeak (Chloridops kona) (extinct)
- Akohekohe (Palmeria dolei)
- † Kauai akialoa (Akialoa stejnegeri) (extinct)
- † Kauai nukupuu (Hemignathus hanapepe) (extinct)
- Hawaii creeper (Loxops mana)
- Akekee (Loxops caeruleirostris)
- Kauai amakihi (Chlorodrepanis stejnegeri)

He also introduced two new genera:

- Telespiza
- † Chloridops (extinct)

Wilson is commemorated in the names of two bird taxa, both of which were described by Lionel Walter Rothschild:

- Chlorodrepanis virens wilsoni (Rothschild, LW, 1893) - a subspecies of the Hawaiʻi ʻamakihi
- Hemignathus wilsoni (Rothschild, LW, 1893) - the ʻAkiapōlāʻau
