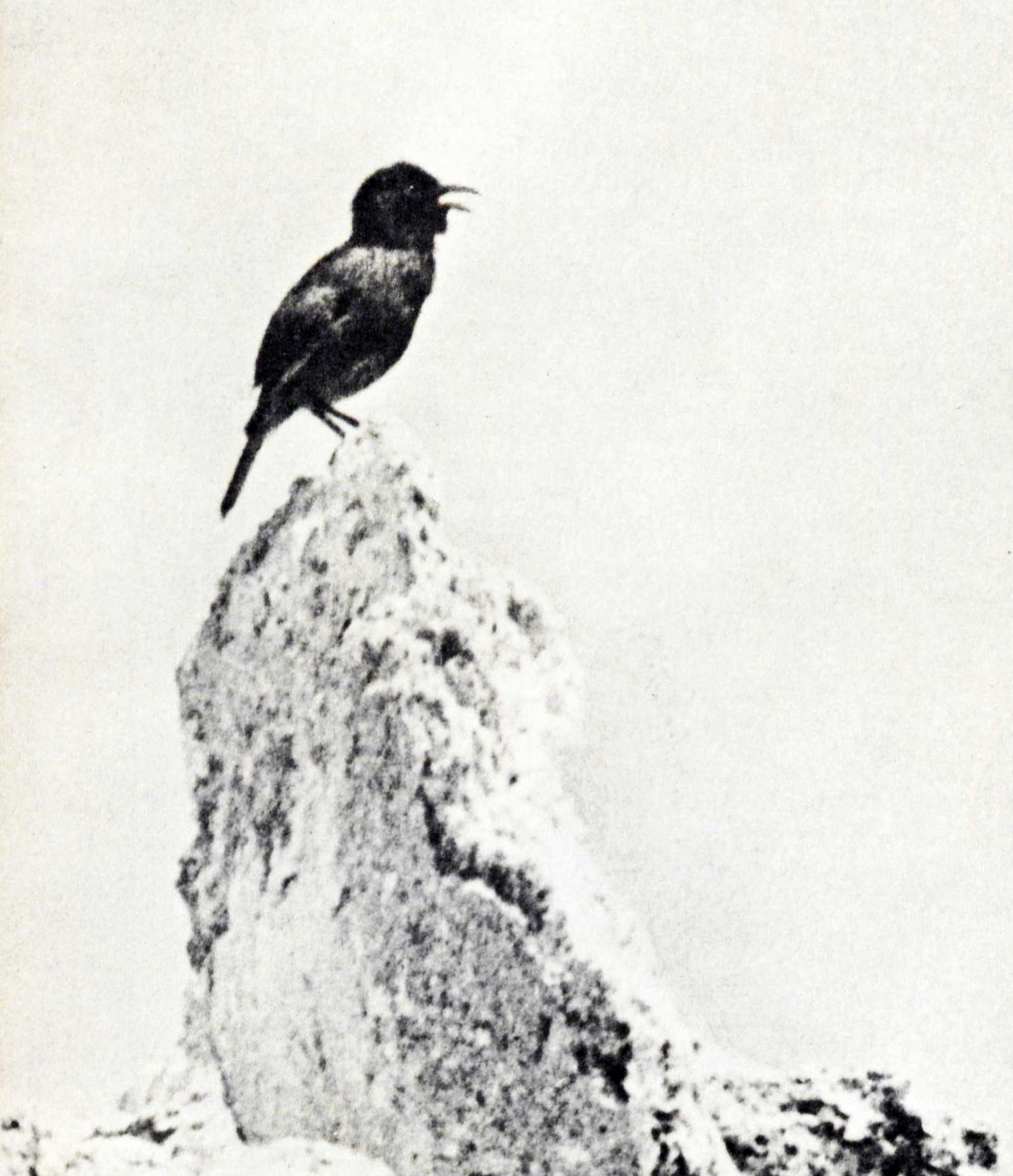
- Male Laysan honeycreeper photographed by Donald R. Dickey in 1923, a few days before the extinction of the species

Conservation status
- Extinct (1923) (IUCN 3.1)

Scientific classification
- Kingdom: Animalia
- Phylum: Chordata
- Class: Aves
- Order: Passeriformes
- Family: Fringillidae
- Subfamily: Carduelinae
- Genus: Himatione
- Species: †H. fraithii

Binomial name
- †Himatione fraithii Rothschild, 1892
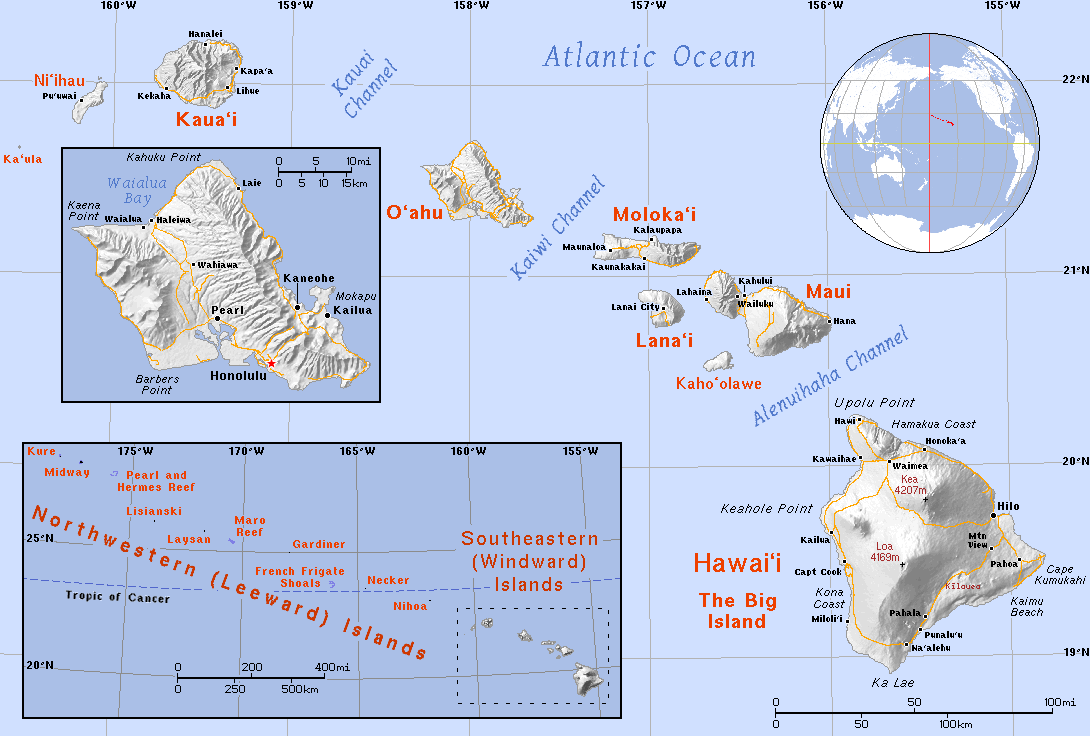
- Map of the Hawaiian Islands showing Laysan Island in the lower left inset box

Synonyms
- List: H. fraithi Rothschild, 1892; H. freethii Rothschild, 1893–1900; H. freethi Rothschild, 1893–1900; H. frethii Schauinsland, 1899; H. sanguinea fraithii Hartert, 1919; H. sanguinea fraithi Delacour; H. sanguinea freethii Amadon, 1950; H. sanguinea freethi Pratt et al., 1987

= Laysan honeycreeper =

Extinct species of bird

The Laysan honeycreeper (Himatione fraithii), also known as the Laysan ʻapapane or Laysan honeyeater, is an extinct species of finch that was endemic to the island of Laysan in the Northwestern Hawaiian Islands. The bird was first recorded in 1828, and in 1892 it received its scientific name from Walter Rothschild, who placed it in the genus Himatione along with the ʻapapane. The specific name, fraithii, refers to George D. Freeth, the self-appointed governor of Laysan, but was misspelled. Rothschild attempted to emend it to freethi in a later publication. This was accepted by most subsequent authors throughout the 20th century, and the bird was also considered a subspecies of the ʻapapane, as H. sanguinea freethii, for most of this time. By the 21st century, after further research, the original name was reinstated and it was considered a full species again. As a Hawaiian honeycreeper, a grouping within the finch subfamily Carduelinae, its ancestors are thought to have come from Asia.

The Laysan honeycreeper was 13–15 cm (5–6 in) long and its wing measured 64–69 mm (2.5–2.7 in). It was bright scarlet vermilion with a faint tint of golden orange on the head, breast and upper abdomen; the rest of its upper parts were orange scarlet. The lower abdomen was dusky gray that faded into brownish white, and the undertail covert feathers were grayish. The wings, tail, bill, and legs were dark brown, and the iris was black with a brown outline. Immature birds were brown with paler lower parts, and had green edges to their wing-covert feathers. The bill was slender and downturned. The sexes were alike, though the bill, wings, and tail were slightly shorter in the female. The ʻapapane differs from the Laysan honeycreeper in features such as being blood-red overall and having a longer bill. The song of the Laysan honeycreeper was described as low and sweet, consisting of several notes. Laysan is a remote coral island with an area of 3.6 km^{2} (1.4 sq mi). The honeycreeper lived throughout, but was most abundant in the interior among tall grass and low bushes near the open plain that bordered the island's lagoon.

This bird was very active and, though less trusting than other birds, sometimes entered buildings to hunt moths and to roost at night. It was nectarivorous and insectivorous and, unlike the ʻapapane, also foraged on the ground. It gathered nectar and insects from flowers, such as caterpillars and moths called millers, only eating the soft parts of the latter. The nest was made of fine grass and rootlets with some dry grass. The breeding season was probably between January and June, and the clutch size was four or five eggs. The eggs were glossless white, with blotches and spots at the larger end. A typical egg measured 18 by 13.7 mm (0.71 by 0.54 in). The bird did not seem to be abundant when discovered and was considered the rarest of the island's birds. In 1903, domestic rabbits were introduced to the island and proceeded to destroy its vegetation. By the visit of the Tanager Expedition in 1923, Laysan had become barren and desert-like, and only three Laysan honeycreepers were found, one of which was filmed. A few days later, on April 23, a sandstorm hit the island, and the last birds perished due to lack of cover. The destruction of Laysan's vegetation led to the extinction of three out of five of its endemic land birds.

== Taxonomy ==
The Laysan honeycreeper was first recorded on Laysan Island on April 3, 1828, by C. Isenbeck, surgeon of the Russian ship Moller, which was visiting the Hawaiian Islands (then called the Sandwich Islands, and the expedition called Laysan "Moller"). His report was published in an 1834 article by the German naturalist Heinrich von Kittlitz. Isenbeck referred to a "red bird" and a "humming bird" ("Colibri" in German), in both cases probably referring to the honeycreeper, the latter due to it feeding on nectar.

In 1892, the British zoologist and banker Walter Rothschild described and named seven new bird species from Hawaii, based on specimens—including a series of ten honeycreeper specimens from Laysan—obtained by the New Zealand collectors Henry C. Palmer and George C. Munro in 1891. These and other collectors had been sent to the Hawaiian Islands in 1890–93 to collect specimens for Rothschild's Natural History Museum at Tring in England.

Rothschild named the honeycreeper Himatione fraithii (the type specimen was an adult male) and classified it as a member of Drepanidae, commonly called the Hawaiian honeycreepers, which was recognized as a family at the time. He found it to resemble the ʻapapane (H. sanguinea), also of the genus Himatione, which is found across the main Hawaii archipelago, differing in several details. The generic name is derived from the Greek word himation, a crimson cape worn by the Spartans to war, in reference to the color of the ʻapapane.

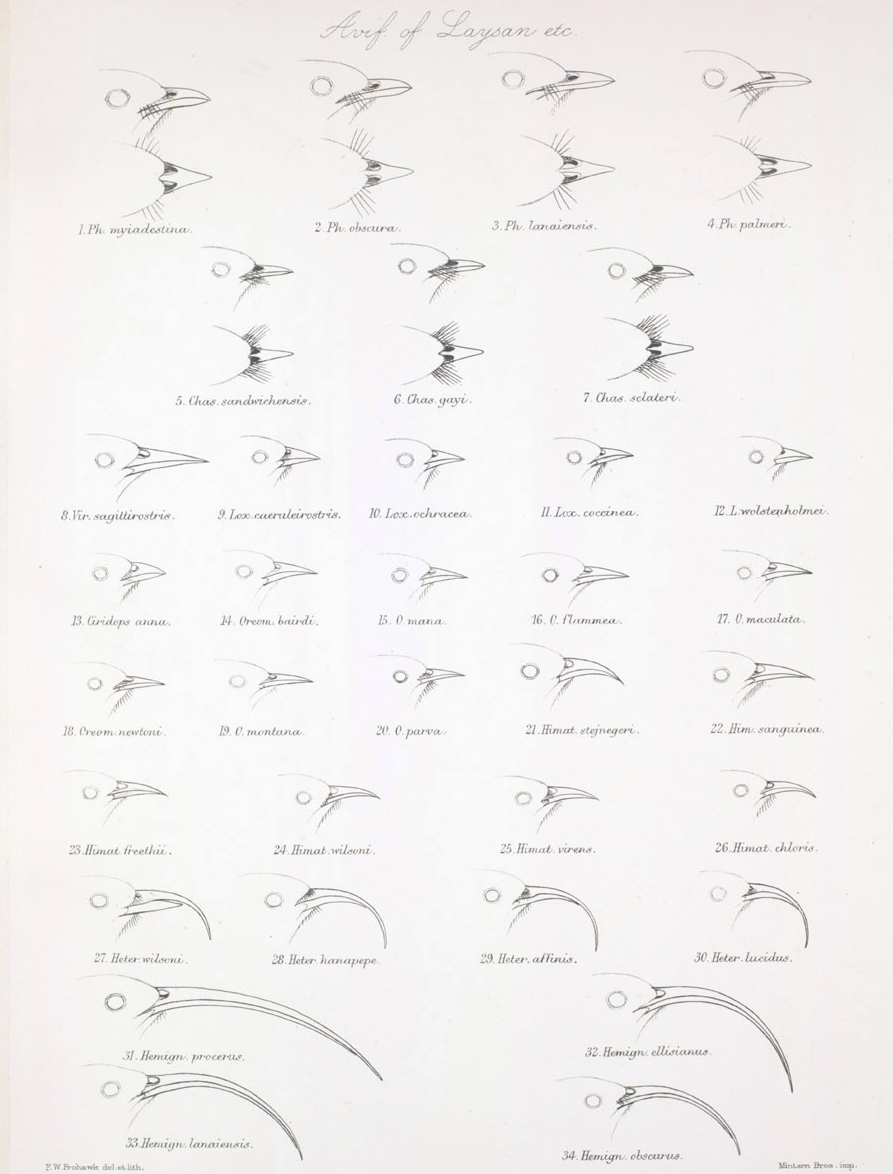
Bills of Hawaiian honeycreepers by Frederick W. Frohawk, 1893–1900; 23 (lower left) is the Laysan honeycreeper, with the variant spelling H. freethii

The specific name refers to George D. Freeth, the self-appointed US governor of Laysan, manager of the guano-mining operations there, and amateur naturalist, who had assisted Palmer and Munro. The misspelling of Freeth's name, fraithii, may have been due to a miscommunication or erroneous assumption, and his full name was not mentioned in the description. From 1893 to 1900, Rothschild published a three-part monograph on the birds of Laysan, with further observations about the honeycreeper, which he referred to as the "Laysan honey-eater". Though some related green species had previously also been considered part of the genus Himatione, he agreed with the American zoologist Robert C. L. Perkins that those should be moved to Chlorodrepanis, and restricted Himatione to the red species: the ʻapapane and the Laysan honeycreeper. By this time, Rothschild had realized that he had misspelled Freeth's name, and attempted to emend the spelling to freethi, but also used the spellings fraithi and freethii in sections of the work. The German zoologist Hugo H. Schauinsland used the spelling frethii in 1899.

After the original description, all the spellings of the name were used by different authors, but the original fraithii was only used a few times. The German ornithologist Ernst Hartert used the original spelling in 1919 and also considered the bird a subspecies of ʻapapane, as H. sanguinea fraithii. This classification was followed by most other taxonomists and the trinomial name was used throughout the 20th century. In 1950, the American ornithologist Dean Amadon considered the spelling fraithii to be a lapsus calami ('slip of the pen', or misspelling), and justified using freethii instead, since Rothschild later corrected the name to that. In 2005, the American ornithologist Harold D. Pratt also indicated that the name had been corrected within the original description. In 2011, the American ornithologist Peter Pyle pointed out that Rothschild had not corrected the name until the first part of his monograph was published in 1893, and that he also appears to have realized his emendation was inappropriate, since he reverted to the original spelling fraithi in the third part. Pyle therefore concluded that according to the International Code of Zoological Nomenclature, the name should not be emended and the original spelling should be reinstated.

In 2015, Pratt, Pyle, and the American ornithologist Reginald E. David formally proposed to the American Ornithologists' Union (AOU) that the Laysan honeycreeper should be split into its own full species again and its specific name changed back to fraithii, based on recent research that supported these conclusions. They also suggested that the bird should be listed in the Checklist of North American Birds under the common English name "Laysan honeycreeper" rather than "Laysan ʻapapane", a name that had by then become popular with some writers, as this would also require a modifier for the name of the ʻapapane. They considered the name "Laysan ʻapapane" a modern retrofitting of Hawaiian names to species whose Hawaiian names are unknown or never had one to begin with, and noted that Native Hawaiians never appear to have visited Laysan Island, which has no traditional Hawaiian name either. These authors stated that they supported the use of Hawaiian neologisms for local use, but thought the AOU should continue designating English names using loan words where appropriate, but not create new ones in other languages. They also found it appropriate that at least one species of Hawaiian honeycreeper would retain the word "honeycreeper" in its common name, for sentimental reasons. In 2015 the AOU implemented these propositions in their checklist. The changes were also adopted by the International Ornithological Committee in their world list of birds the same year.

There are at least 105 known specimens (six of them mounted) of the Laysan honeycreeper in museums across the world, but two specimens appear to have gone missing. Some museums have multiple specimens, including 24 in the Bernice Pauahi Bishop Museum in Honolulu, 20 (including the type specimen) in the American Museum of Natural History in New York City, and 20 in the National Museum of Natural History in Washington, D.C. There are also at least two skeletons, three nests, and one egg preserved. The known specimens were collected between 1892 and 1913. The ratio of males to females between adult specimens in museum collections is 1.7:1.

=== Evolution ===
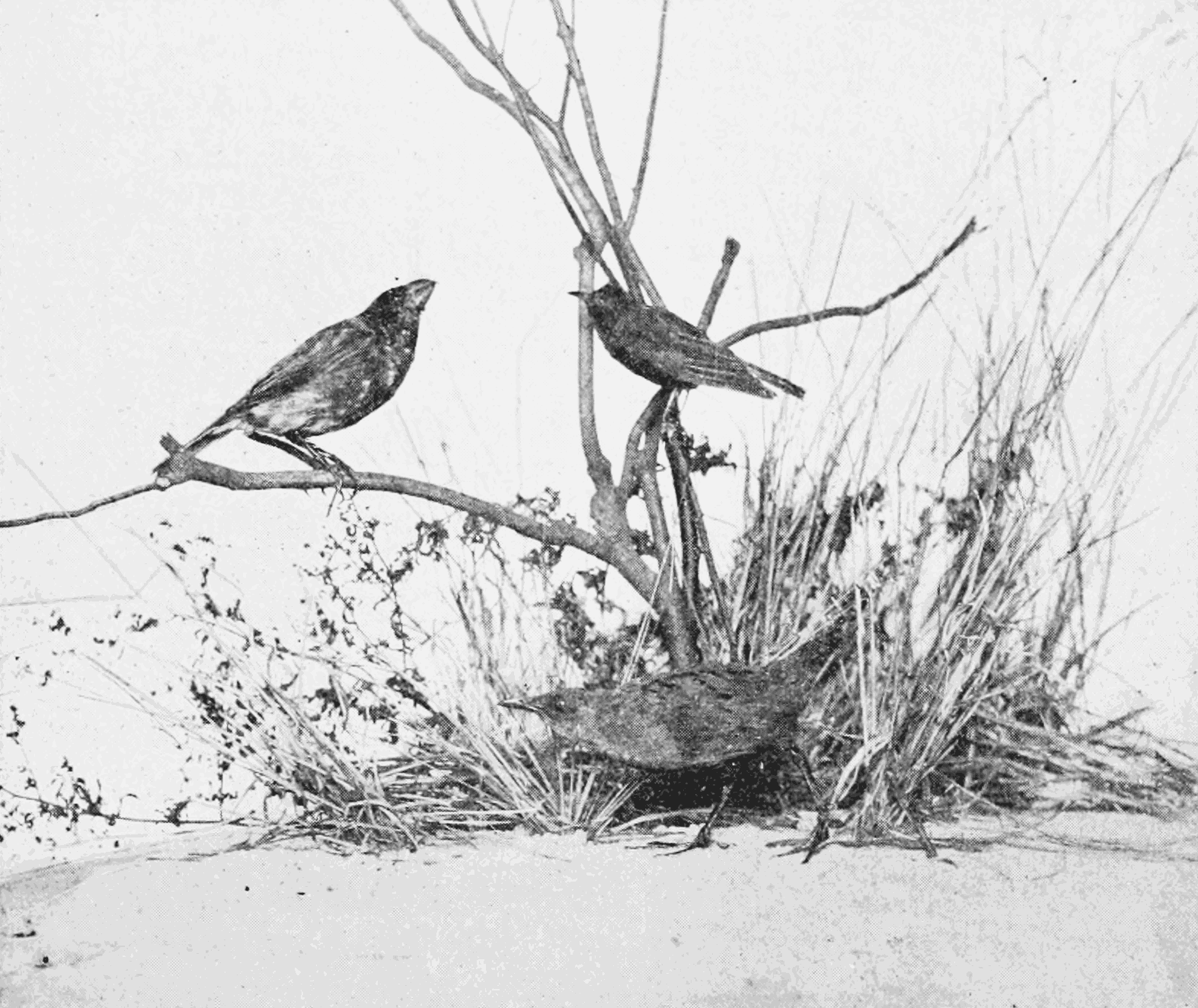
Taxidermied Laysan finch (upper left), Laysan honeycreeper (upper middle), and Laysan rail (below), 1903; the latter two are extinct

In 1899, Schauinsland considered the Laysan honeycreeper an example of how a new species may arise through isolation and noted its resemblance to the ʻapapane. Perkins stated in 1903 that the Laysan honeycreeper was descended from the ʻapapane colonizing the island, and he divided the Hawaiian honeycreepers into two main groups. Amadon noted in 1950 that although the Laysan finch (Telespiza cantans) and the Laysan honeycreeper spent more time on the ground than their relatives, their power of flight was seemingly not reduced. He pointed out that the length of their wings was rather short, which perhaps indicated a beginning tendency in such a direction. The wing of the finch is shorter, perhaps because it had reached Laysan earlier than the honeycreeper.

In 1976, the American geologist Seymour O. Schlanger and botanist George W. Gillett proposed that because Laysan had been a raised coral island until 18,000 years ago, whereafter erosion and tectonic subsidence reduced its height, it could have been a refugium for upland and montane species that had adapted to the drastic changes in habitat. They pointed to the Laysan honeycreeper and Laysan finch as evidence for this, being the only Hawaiian honeycreepers living close to beaches. The American ornithologists Storrs L. Olson and Helen F. James considered the Laysan honeycreeper a distinct species from the ʻapapane in 1982, but without elaboration.

Olson and the American ornithologist Alan C. Ziegler stated in 1995 that while the Laysan honeycreeper was often considered a subspecies of ʻapapane, its skull features indicate it was distinct and probably more primitive, and therefore perhaps a remnant of an earlier evolutionary stage rather than being particularly specialized for the conditions on Laysan. They speculated that if this bird could survive on Laysan, there could also be a niche for a relative on the nearby island of Nīhoa. They also argued that Hawaiian honeycreepers are not actually an upland group, but that this perception of them as such comes from them having been wiped out from lowland areas of Hawaii in prehistoric times by human-made habitat destruction, and that many fossils of the group (including of Himatione) have been found in areas just above sea level. They therefore disagreed with the idea that the species found there were a remnant of upland populations or necessarily ancient occupants.

The American biologist Mark J. Rauzon speculated in 2001 that the Laysan honeycreeper could have descended from ʻapapanes that flew there from the rainforests of Kauaʻi, 970 km (600 mi) away, but wondered why there were no descendants on Nīhoa, which is closer and has more vegetation. Pratt and the American biologist Thane K. Pratt stated in 2001 that due to its distinct physical features, the Laysan honeycreeper was unquestionably distinct from the ʻapapane following the phylogenetic species concept. They added that potential isolating mechanisms included its distinct song, feeding and nesting behavior, and its very different habitat. They found it very unlikely that the two birds would have been able to interbreed, let alone freely, and considered it likely that future researchers would split them. A 2004 phylogenetic analysis by James based on osteological features found Himatione to group in a clade similar to what Perkins suggested in 1903. Her "clade 11" is depicted in the cladogram below († denotes recent extinctions, ‡ denotes prehistoric):

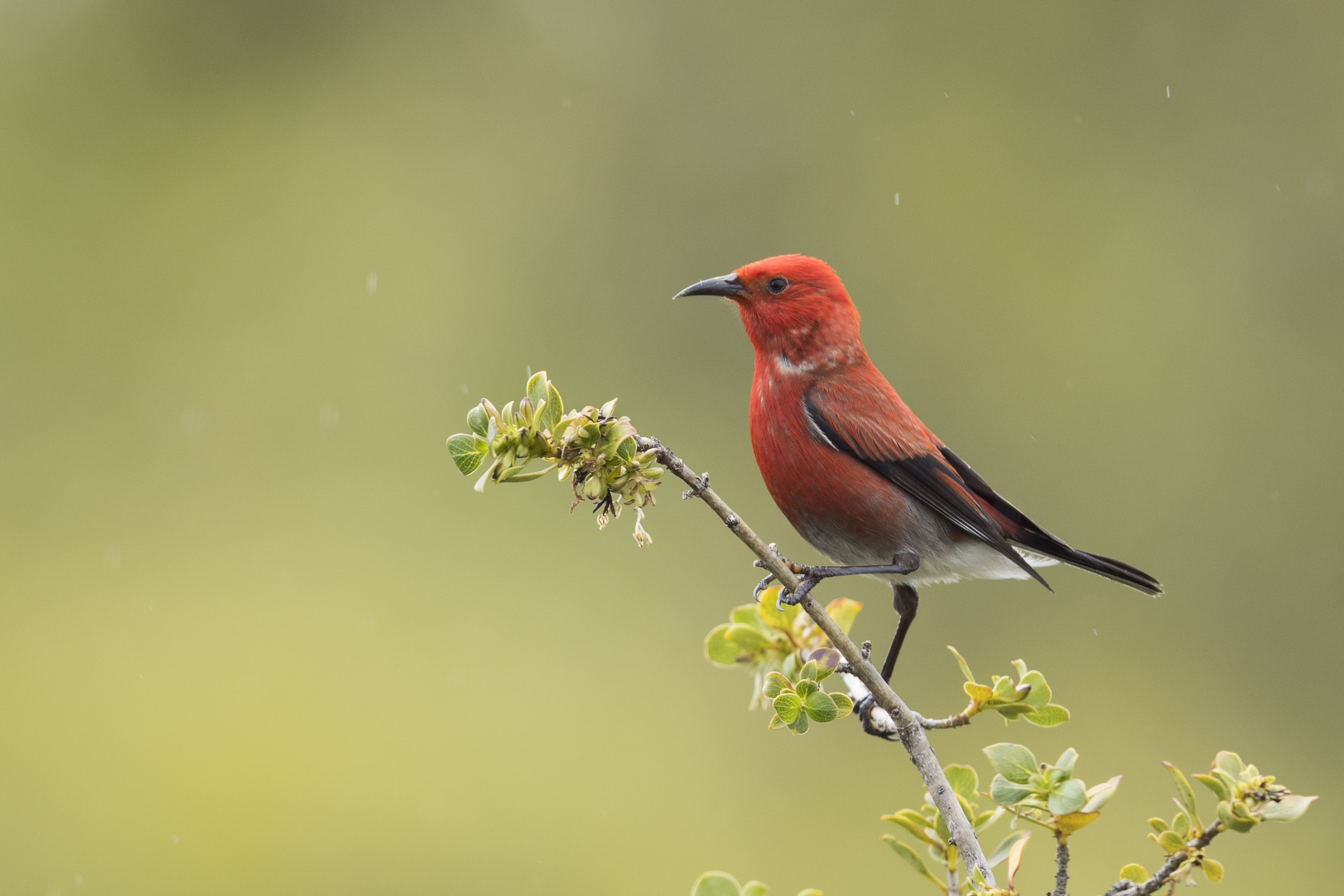
The ʻapapane, the closest relative of the Laysan honeycreeper

- - Vestiaria coccinea (ʻiʻiwi)
  - †Drepanis funerea (black mamo)
  - †Drepanis pacifica (Hawaii mamo)
  - Himatione sanguinea (ʻapapane)
  - †Himatione freethii (Laysan honeycreeper, now fraithii)
  - Palmeria dolei (ʻākohekohe)
  - - ‡Ciridops tenax (stout-legged finch)
    - ‡Ciridops sp. (from Oahu)
    - †Ciridops anna (ʻula-ʻai-hāwane)

The Hawaiian honeycreepers, variously considered to constitute the family Drepanididae (formerly spelled "Drepanidae" or "Drepaniidae", a name that turned out to be nomenclaturally unavailable, because it was preoccupied by a family of moths), subfamily Drepanidinae, or tribe Drepaninini, were long recognized as constituting a natural group of finches with varying bill-shapes and plumage patterns as a result of adapting to island environments. Their relationships to other finches remained uncertain, and they were often considered a distinct lineage outside the Fringillidae. By the turn of the 21st century, genetic studies had established that drepanids were genetically close to the subfamily Carduelinae; studies from 2011 and 2012 found them nested within that group as the sister group of the genus Carpodacus from Asia (neither study included the Laysan honeycreeper itself). This indicates the Hawaiian honeycreepers originated in Asia, and genetic divergence was estimated to roughly coincide with when the oldest of the Hawaiian Islands formed, about 5.7 million years ago, with further divergence occurring as other islands formed. It was also proposed that Drepanidinae should be treated as a junior synonym of Carduelinae. Since the ʻapapane had been found to be the sister taxon of the ʻākohekohe (Palmeria dolei) by some studies, Pratt suggested in 2014 that their genera Himatione and Palmeria might be merged.

== Description ==
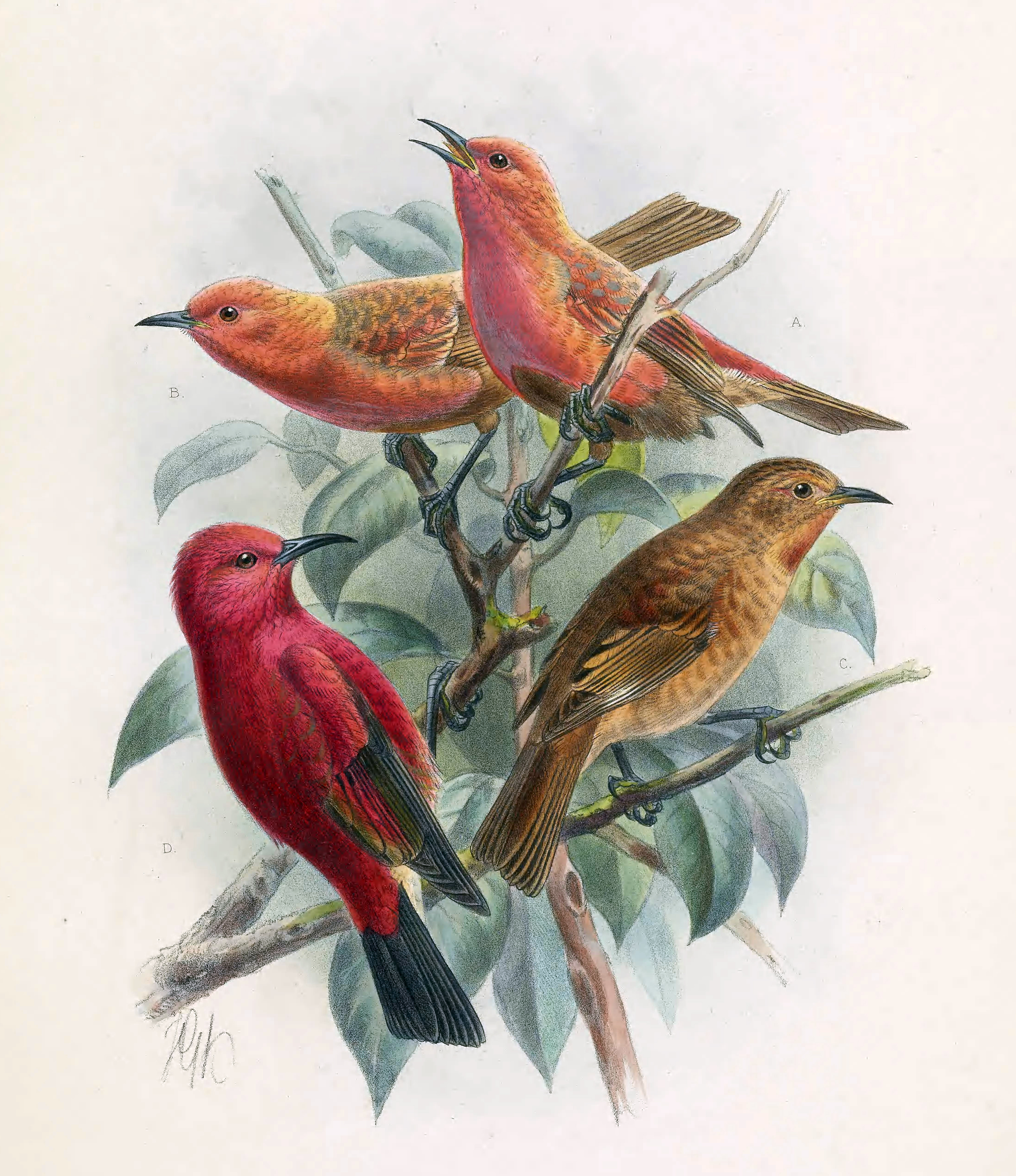
Adult male Laysan honeycreeper (A), adult female (B), juvenile (C), and ʻapapane (D), by John Gerrard Keulemans, 1893–1900

The Laysan honeycreeper was a small bird, with published length measurements ranging from 13–15 cm (5–6 in). The wing measured 64–69 mm (2.5–2.7 in), the tail 61 mm (2.4 in), the culmen (upper surface of the beak) 14 mm (0.55 in), and the tarsometatarsus (lower leg bone) was 23 mm (0.9 in). It was bright scarlet vermilion with a faint tint of golden orange on the head, breast and upper abdomen; the rest of its upper parts were orange scarlet. The lower abdomen was dusky gray that faded into brownish white, and the undertail covert feathers were grayish. The wings, tail, bill, and legs were dark brown, and the iris was black with a brown outline. Immature birds were brown, with paler lower parts, and had green edges to their wing-covert feathers. The bill was slender and downturned.

The sexes were alike, though the bill, wings, and tail were slightly shorter in the female. Although Rothschild stated in his 1892 description that the female was paler than the male, the American zoologist Walter K. Fisher indicated in 1903 that such differences may have been age-related instead. Fisher also noted that the illustration of the Laysan honeycreeper published by Rothschild showed the bird as far too pale, giving an inaccurate idea of its color. Rothschild also mentioned in his 1893–1900 work that freshly molted Laysan honeycreepers were a deeper red and not as easy to distinguish from the ʻapapane, while the latter did not fade to as pale a red.

The ʻapapane differs from the Laysan honeycreeper in being blood-red overall, with black wings and tail, whiter undertail covert feathers, and a longer bill. The two also differ in that the Laysan species had a shorter, stouter bill, and in that its primary feathers did not have oblique truncation (in the ʻapapane this truncation produces a "wing note" sounding like vocalization). Amadon suggested in 1950 that the fading and bleaching of Laysan landbirds was in part due to the exposed nature of the island. Olson and Ziegler also suggested in 1995 that the intense sunlight of Lysan had caused the honeycreeper's plumage to fade, accounting for the difference from the ʻapapane, but noted it had been found to be distinct in osteological features. Pratt countered in 2005 that white undertail feathers cannot fade to brown since they lack pigmentation to begin with.

Palmer reported the song of the Laysan honeycreeper as low and "sweet", consisting of several notes. He noted it was usually silent, except during the breeding season, and was in "full song" during January and February. While catching and skinning birds in 1891, Palmer caught a Laysan honeycreeper in his net, which proceeded to sing in his hand; he answered it with a whistle, which it returned, continuing for some minutes without seeming frightened. Munro also described the song as "sweet" with a few notes. The American ornithologist and photographer Donald R. Dickey stated that their "charming song is out of proportion to their size" in 1923.

== Habitat ==
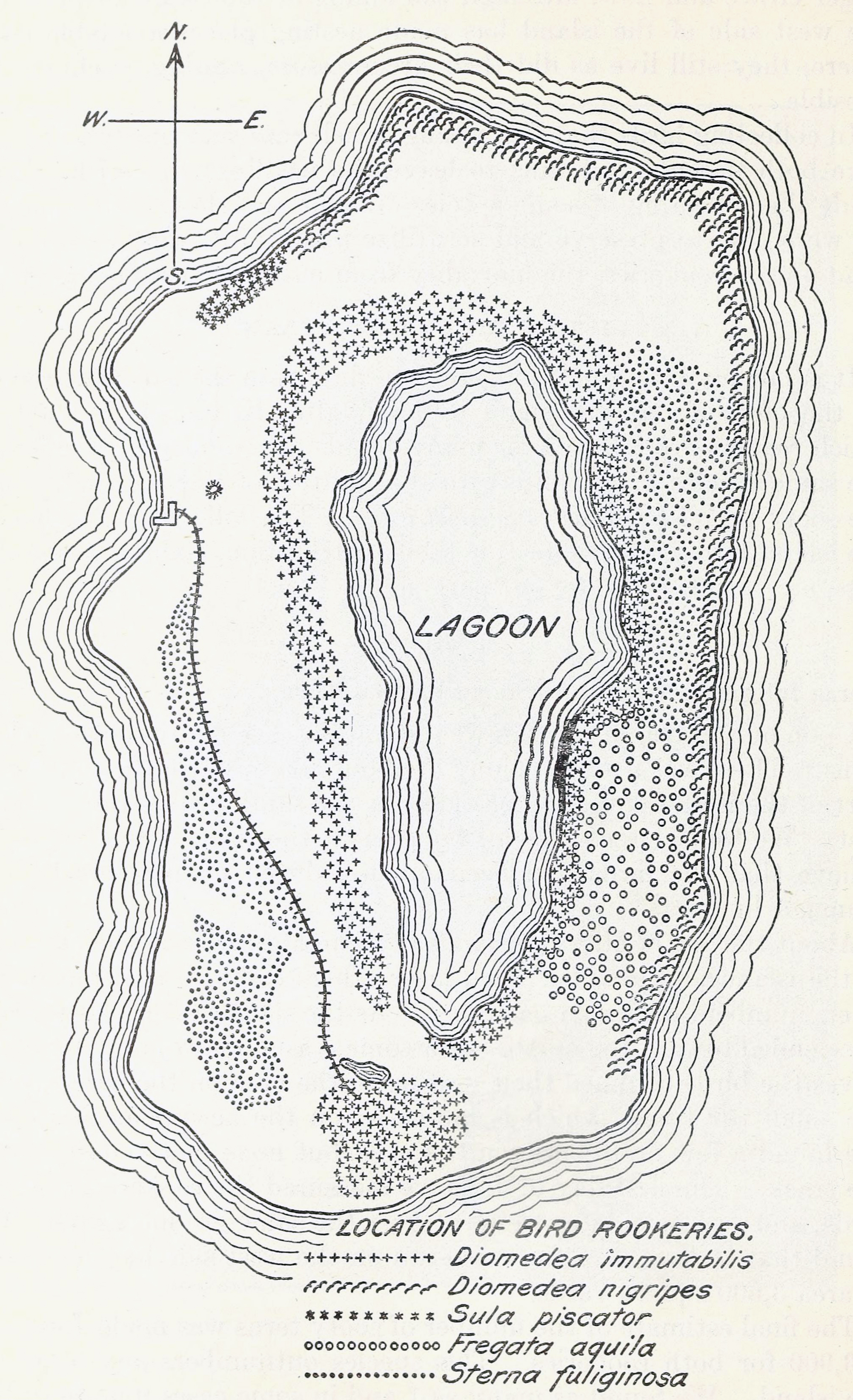
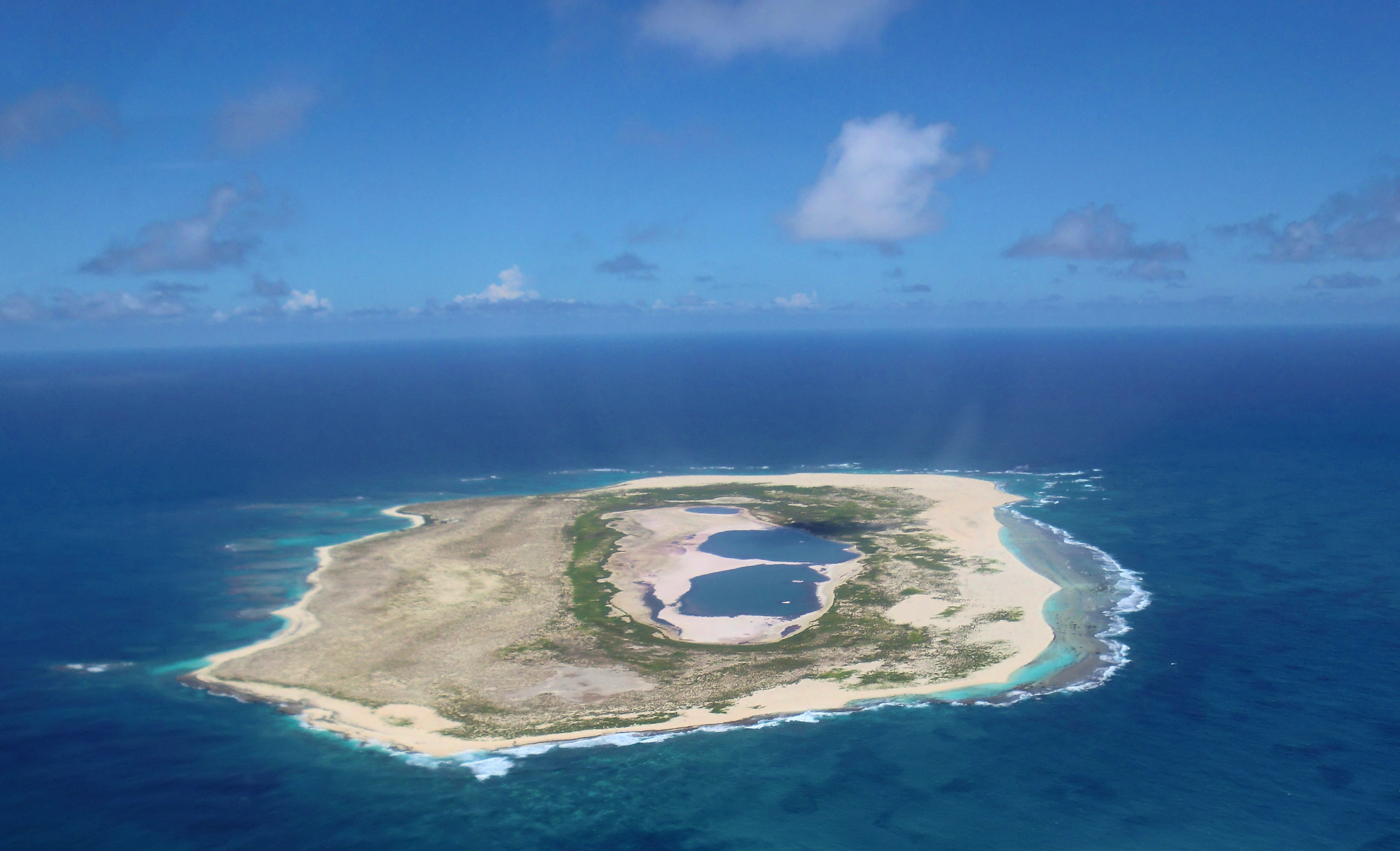
1912 map of Laysan (left) and 2010 aerial photograph

The Laysan honeycreeper was endemic to Laysan, a remote island that has a total land area of 3.6 km^{2} (1.4 sq mi), and is the largest of the northwestern Hawaiian Islands in the central Pacific Ocean. Laysan is the eroded remnant of a once high island, built up by volcanic activity, perhaps the flattened top of a volcano that formed in the Miocene. The island rises into up to 12 m (40 ft) high crest elevations. Its subsurface substratum is coralline rock, and its topography suggests it was once part of an atoll with a lagoon that occupies about one-fifth of the island's center, and is now almost filled with sand and coral fragments. The island is ringed by sand dunes, but is otherwise well-vegetated. The island's original flora was the most varied of the northwestern Hawaiian islands, but much of it was destroyed by human activities by 1923, leaving near-desert-like conditions and several extinct plant species, though the extent of the vegetation had almost recovered by 1973.

In 1903, Fisher stated that the Laysan honeycreeper was found all over Laysan Island, but was most abundant in the interior among tall grass and low bushes near the open plain that bordered the lagoon, an area where all the landbirds appeared to congregate. This was also the favored nesting area, with its broad patches of the succulent Portulaca that these birds fed from. Munro added that they also frequented grasstops and other plants on the fringes of the lagoon. Their bright, scarlet plumage made them conspicuous as they fluttered among the soft green Chenopodium bushes. This species was the only nectar-feeding finch of the northwestern Hawaiian Islands.

== Behavior and ecology ==
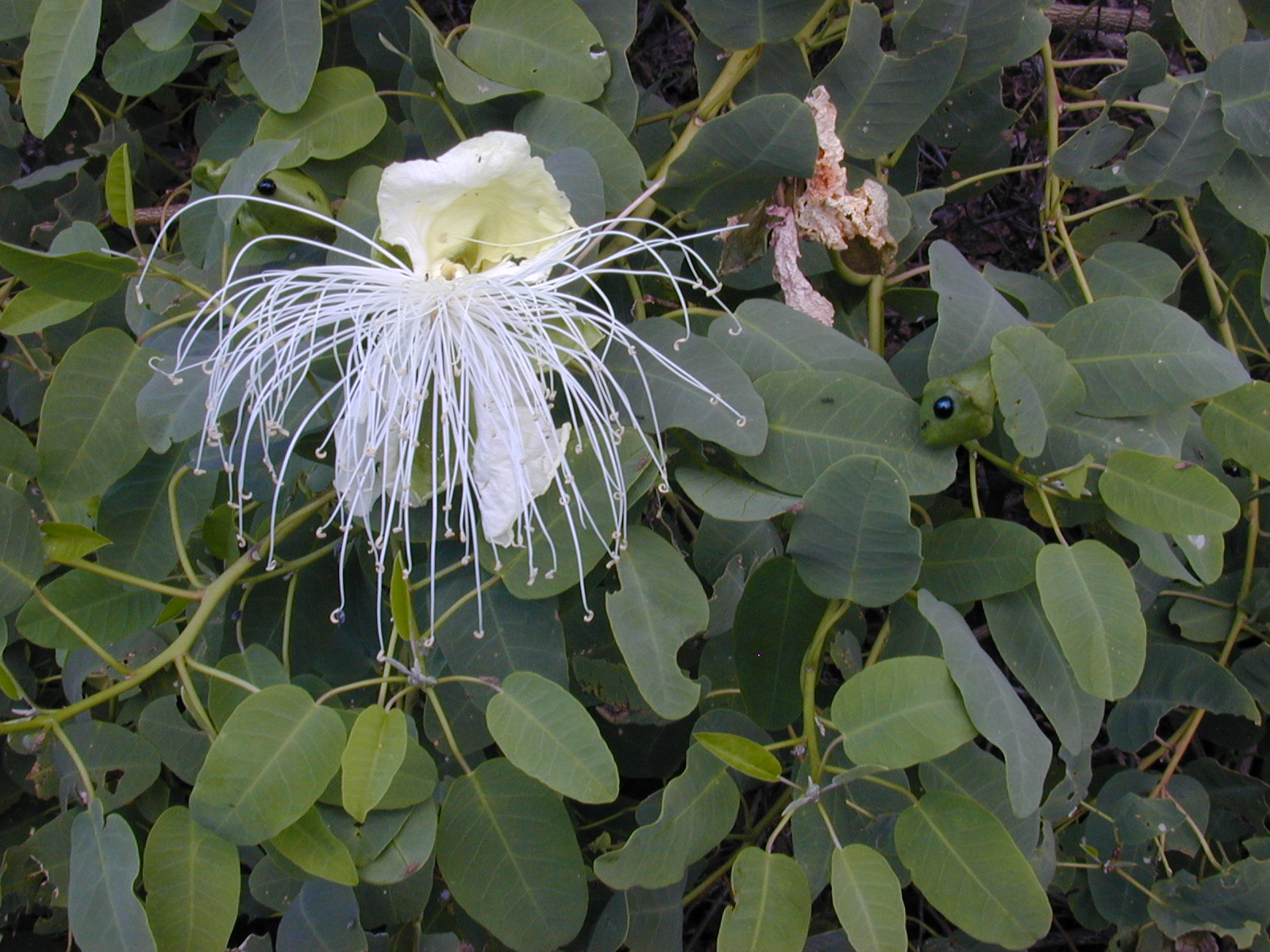
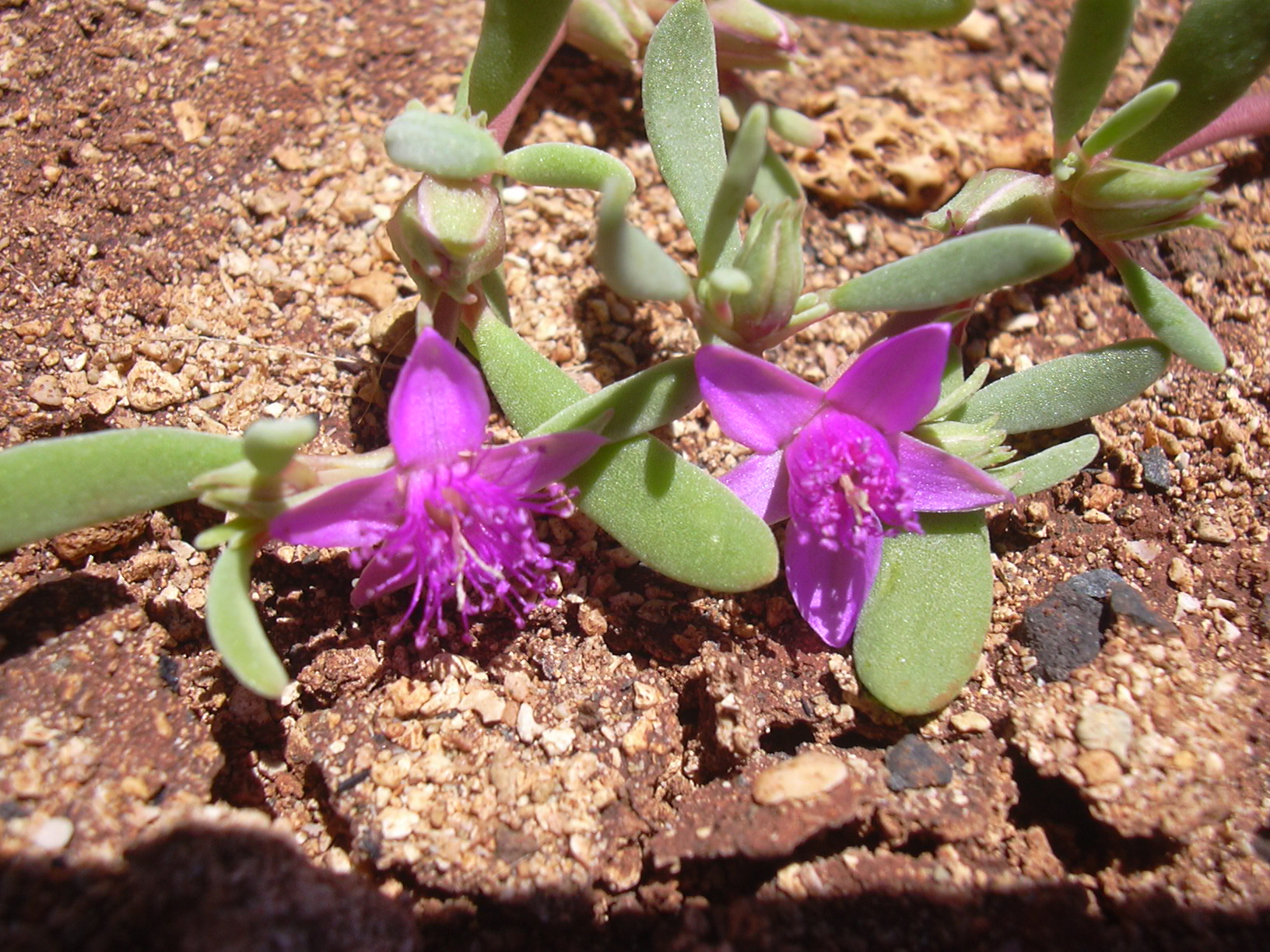
Maiapilo (left) and ʻākulikuli, some of the flowers that the Laysan honeycreeper fed nectar from

Few naturalists encountered the Laysan honeycreeper and few accounts were left of its life history. It was very active, like the Laysan millerbird (Acrocephalus familiaris familiaris), always present in vegetation around buildings, and though perhaps less trusting than the millerbird, they were reported to sometimes enter buildings to hunt moths and for roosting at night. Palmer stated he generally saw them in pairs. Munro described its flight as "weak and low", and said it could be caught with a hand net, despite being less tame than the other birds. He stated they would gather around houses and drink rainwater from leaks in barrels, indicating that they "missed water" more than the other birds of the island. He speculated they had perhaps not adapted to the meager supply of water there; apart from rain and dew, the only natural moisture was a seep of brackish water.

The Laysan honeycreeper was nectarivorous and insectivorous, and insects were probably a more important part of their diet than nectar in some seasons. Unlike the ʻapapane, it also foraged on the ground. The bird originally fed on nectar from the native flower maiapilo (Capparis sandwichiana), but when that species disappeared, it switched to ʻākulikuli (Sesuvium portulacastrum) and ʻihi (Portulaca lutea). It was also observed visiting nohu (Tribulus cistoides) and pōhuehue (Ipomoea pes-caprae). The Laysan honeycreeper spent the day foraging while walking like pipits after small insects or drinking from flowers with its brush-like tongue. The way it rapidly went from flower to flower and precisely inserted its bill between their petals reminded Schauinsland and Fisher of hummingbirds, though it did so by walking rather than hovering in front of them. The Laysan honeycreeper gathered insects from flowers, such as small, green caterpillars, and were fond of the large, brownish moths called millers (including species of Agrotis and others that have since disappeared), which were abundant on the island, and were also fed on by other insect-eating birds. The honeycreepers were observed extracting moths from between boards, grasping them with one foot (always the left according to Freeth) while eating the soft parts, leaving the wings and other hard parts.

=== Reproduction ===
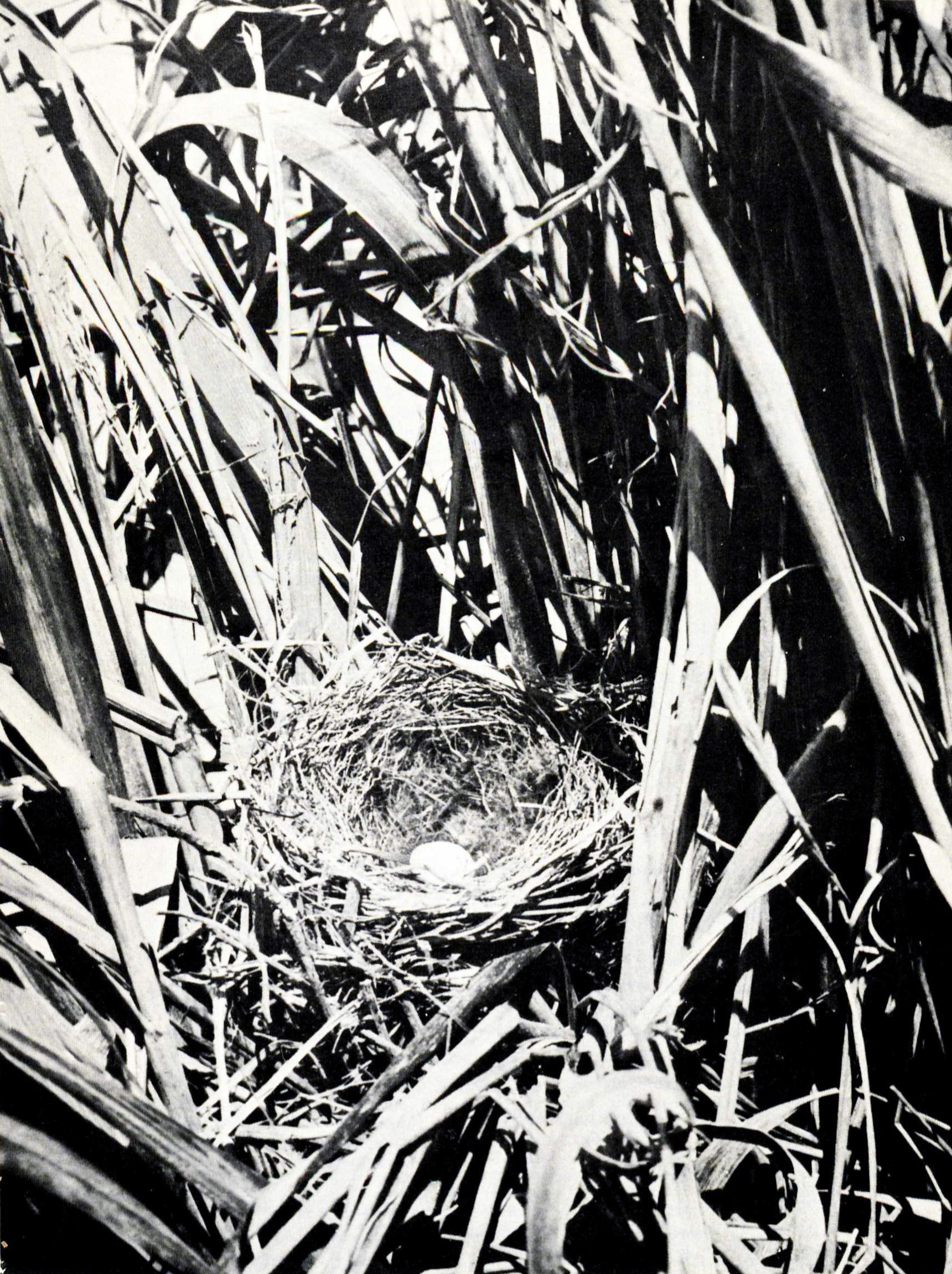
Laysan honeycreeper nest in a grass tuft, photographed by Walter K. Fisher, 1902

Fisher noted that the nest of the Laysan honeycreeper was more difficult to find than that of the Laysan millerbird, and found only one, in the middle of a grass tuft about 61 cm (2 ft) above ground. Schauinsland noted it also nested in thick aweoweo (Chenopodium oahuense) shrubs. The nest was made of fine grass (identified as kawelu (Eragrostis variabilis) by Pratt based on Fisher's photograph of the nest) and rootlets with some dry grass, and its bowl measured about 5.6 cm (2.2 in) across and 4.1 cm (1.6 in) in depth. The nest, which was variously described as loosely or well built, was lined with fine rootlets, petrel feathers, and brown down from albatrosses, but there were no large, white feathers, which made the nest indistinguishable from that of the Laysan millerbird, which built nests in nearby tufts. It differed from that of the millerbird in being tighter in construction and having a shallower cup. The nest was also likened to that of the Laysan finch; the nests of different land birds of the island may have been similar due to the limited selection of building materials.

Little is known about the breeding cycle of the Laysan honeycreeper, and most observers did not record when nests and young were found. Freeth told Palmer that the bird was in "full song" in January and February, when there was also a golden gloss over the red plumage. This indicates that the breeding season was between that time and June, when Palmer saw full-grown young birds. Fisher collected a nest with an egg in mid-May, and the American zoologist William A. Bryan collected an egg on May 10. The American ornithologist Alfred M. Bailey, who visited Laysan in 1912, stated that the clutch size was four or five eggs; sets of three were taken by collectors. The ovate eggs were glossless white, with grayish blotches and spots at the larger end, and reddish brown spots above them, these markings often forming circles. The eggs varied in size, but a typical egg measured 18 by 13.7 mm (0.71 by 0.54 in). The eggs were similar to those of the short-toed treecreeper (Certhia brachydactyla) and the barn swallow (Hirundo rustica), but much less glossy.

== Extinction ==
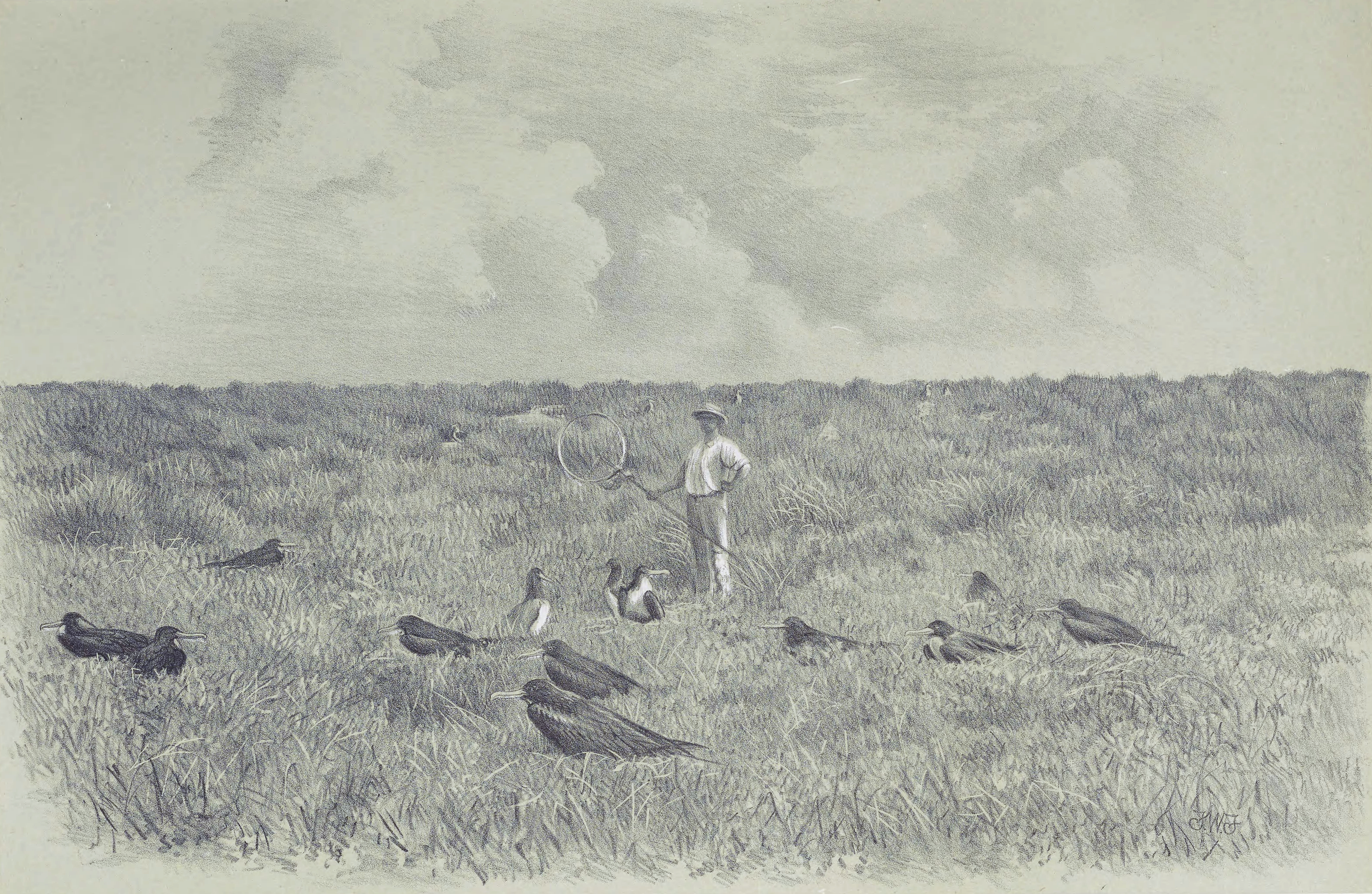
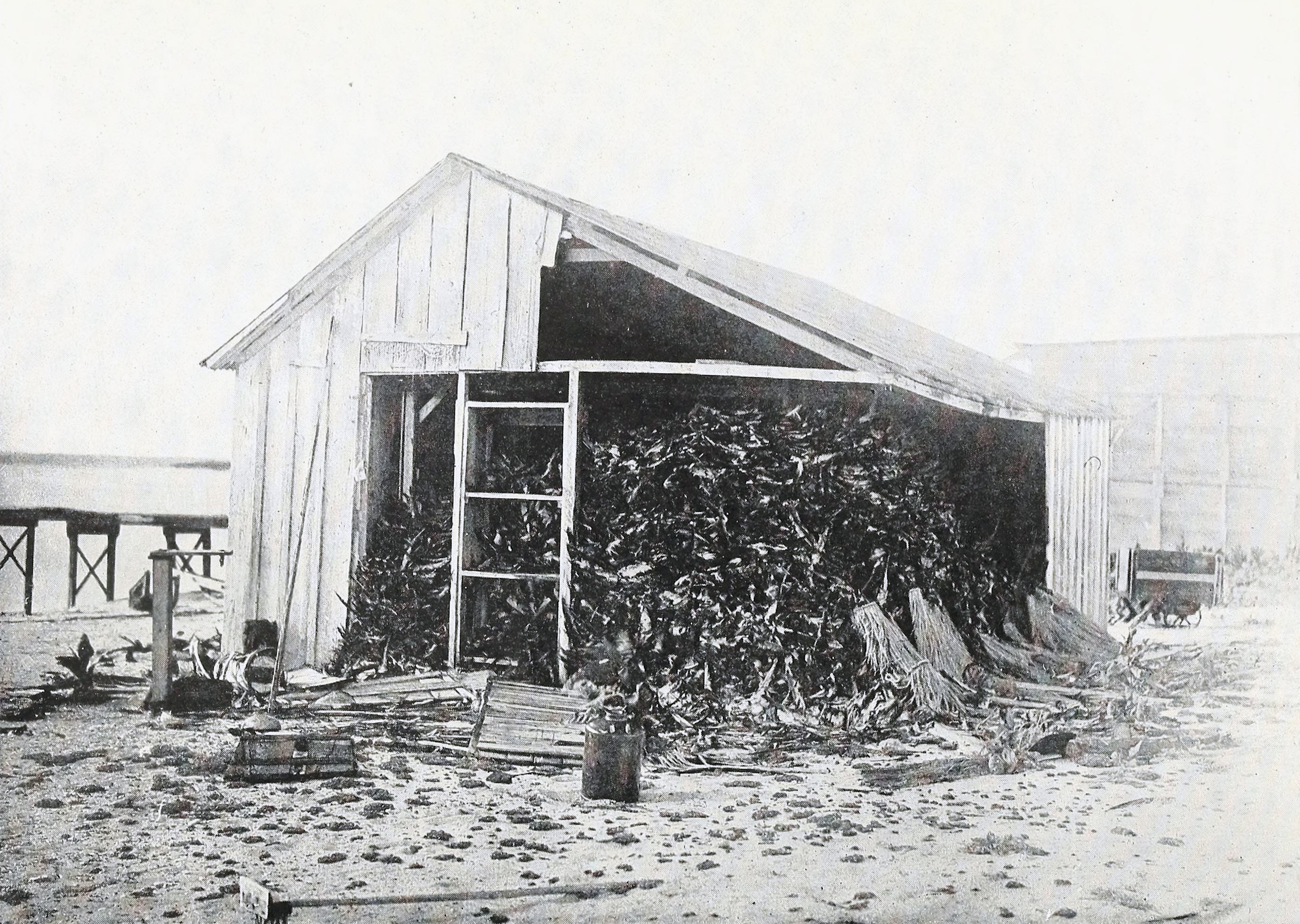
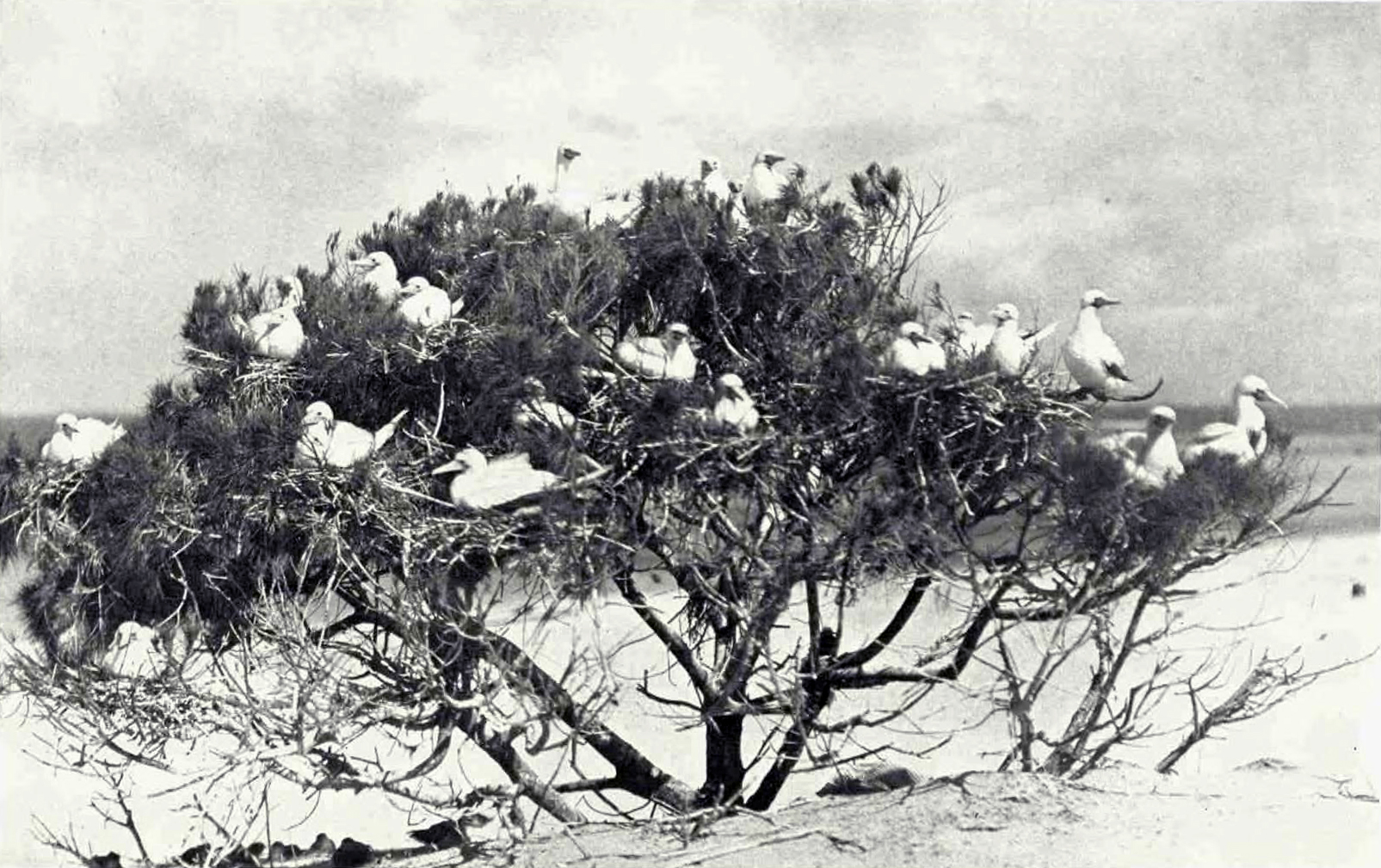
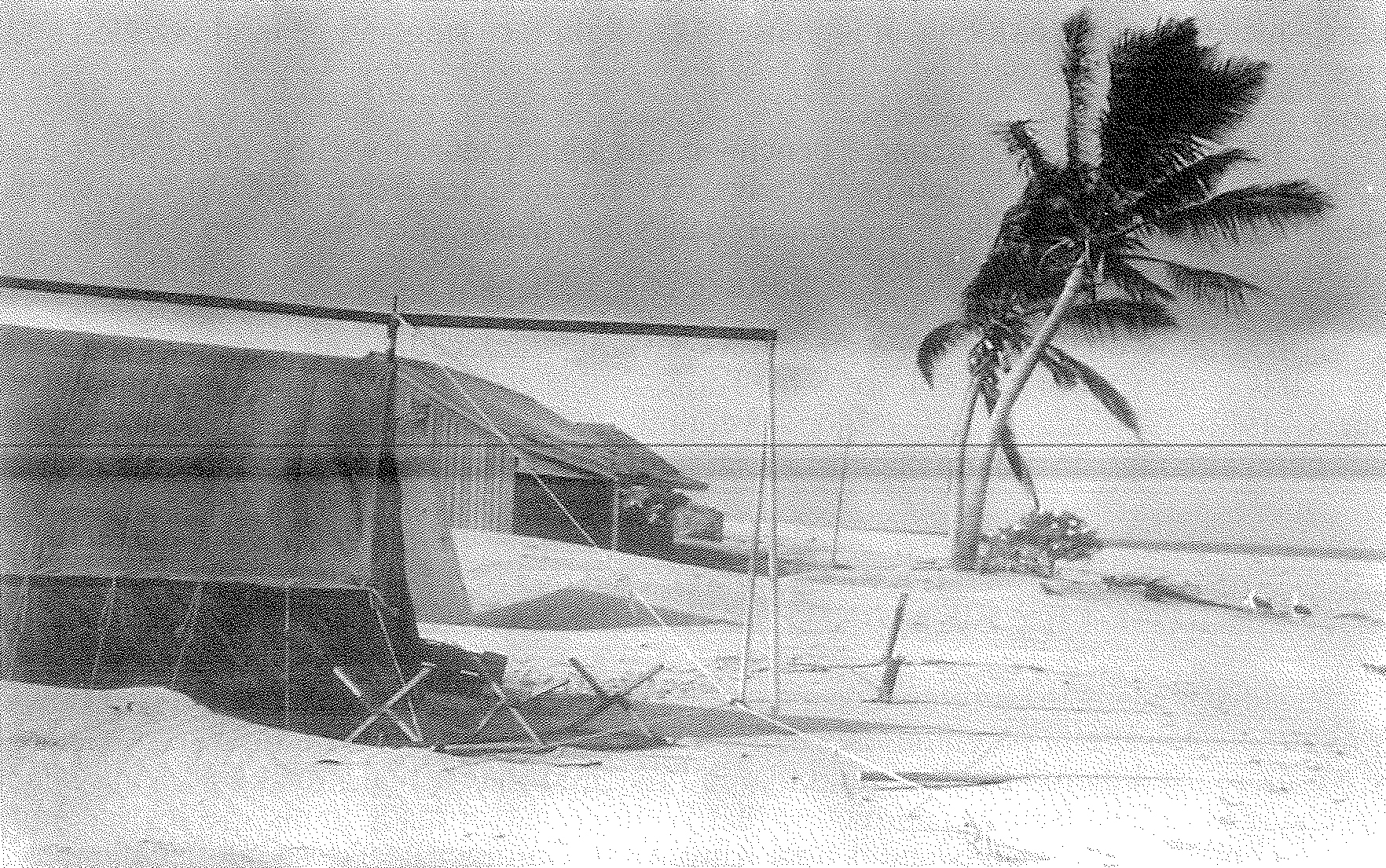
The collector Henry C. Palmer among frigatebirds on Laysan in the early 1890s, by Frohawk (upper left), hundreds of poached albatross wings piled in an old guano shed in 1911 (upper right), and Dickey's 1923 photographs of the last ironwood to survive destruction by introduced rabbits, crowded with seabirds (lower left), and the Tanager Expedition camp after the sandstorm that killed the last three Laysan honeycreepers (lower right)

The few observations of the Laysan honeycreeper indicate it was not abundant on Laysan to begin with, and only three population estimates were made. Isenbeck already considered the bird uncommon when visiting in 1828 in the first report of the species; Palmer considered it the rarest of the island's birds in 1890, though finding them in fair numbers, and Fisher gave a similar assessment in 1903. The American zoologist Charles C. Nutting stated in 1903 that the species of Laysan were abundant and that there were excellent conditions for collecting and studying birds. He suggested that when guano supplies ran out, Laysan should become a government preserve for bird life, protected from human-made destruction. Laysan was exploited for the guano produced by its large seabird colonies from 1890, but this became unprofitable by 1904. The German superintendent of the guano operation, Max Schlemmer, introduced domestic rabbits, European hares, and guinea pigs to the island in 1903 to start a meat-canning business that would provide food for guano miners and to amuse his children. The venture did not succeed, but the rabbits proceeded to destroy the island's vegetation.

In 1909, the US president Theodore Roosevelt issued an executive order that made several Hawaiian islets and reefs (including Laysan) part of the Hawaiian Islands Reservation. During a 1911 expedition to assess the condition of bird life on Laysan, the American ornithologist Homer R. Dill and Bryan found rabbits everywhere, and foresaw that there would be no vegetation left if drastic measures were not taken. Dill and Bryan described what they saw as "wholesale slaughter": they found thousands of bird skeletons left over by feather hunters, as well as several Laysan honeycreeper skins, but noted the birds were still fearless towards humans. They estimated that 300 Laysan honeycreepers remained and that they and other birds there were "doomed to extermination" if their food supply was not preserved.

Bailey recalled in 1956 that a singing honeycreeper perched on a dead hau (Hibiscus tiliaceus) tree was the first bird to greet him and the Canadian ornithologist George Willett when they visited Laysan in 1912. They were less common than other birds, but were constantly around the building the researchers inhabited. Because of the rapidly disappearing vegetation, the birds were confined to patches of wild tobacco, the few remaining Scaevola plants, and grass tufts. In 1915, the American naval officer William H. Munter reported that the Laysan honeycreeper was fairly common, and that they were judged to number 1000. The American ornithologists Charles A. Ely and Roger B. Clapp pointed out in 1973 that Munter's estimates were perhaps too generous, as he did not consider them numerous the following year.

Male filmed by Dickey in 1923, a few days before the species' extinction

In 1923, the Tanager Expedition, a scientific survey of the Northwestern Hawaiian Islands onboard USS Tanager, visited Laysan to eradicate the island's rabbits. By this time, the American ornithologist Alexander Wetmore described the island as a "barren wasteland of sand" that from its appearance might as well be a desert, whereas 20 years earlier it had been a pleasant spot covered in green vegetation. Three Laysan honeycreepers were found to be alive by the expedition members; the birds were scrambling around rocks and guano to pick up small flies. While filming a Laysan finch on April 18, Dickey heard a male honeycreeper, and managed to film it singing on a coral rock, probably the last photographic evidence of this bird, which some authors called the "swan song" of the species. A photograph of this bird that has been published in several sources was probably taken from the footage. A few days later, on April 23, Laysan was hit by a gale spanning three days that caused a strong sandstorm, during which the last three Laysan honeycreepers perished. Their deaths were attributed to the lack of cover during the storm. Some of Dickey's last field notes on the Laysan honeycreeper from April 11, 1923, read as follows:

Reno's report of finding 3 specimens of Himatione alive and thriving today in the tobacco patch SW of the lagoon makes me all the more certain that the species could all have adapted themselves to the changed conditions and gained a livelihood had they only been granted nesting cover to guarantee new recruits to take the place of the older birds as they died off. This tiny Honey Eater was probably the most specialized in its feeding habits of all the endemic land birds on the island. God knows when the last flower bloomed on this barren waste, yet here are at least three individuals of this specialized form persisting as a sort of heritage from the last nest of the species that was built in sufficient cover to survive. But as it seems to me, old age and death now inevitably stalk this childless remnant of a vanishing species.

The destruction of Laysan's vegetation led to the extinction of three out of five of its endemic land birds, and many other bird species have been driven to extinction by human activities across Hawaii (both in prehistoric and modern times). Wetmore reported that the Laysan millerbird had disappeared entirely by his 1923 visit (probably during another sandstorm only months earlier) and only two Laysan rails (Zapornia palmeri) remained, while about 20 Laysan ducks (Anas laysanensis) had survived. Laysan finches were still singing and hopping about, and the large seabird colonies were not as affected. The rabbits were eradicated from Laysan by the Tanager Expedition during 1923, leading to a remarkable recovery of the vegetation, but too late for the Laysan honeycreeper. Though many searches for the bird were subsequently attempted, such as the Vanderbilt Pacific Equatorial Expedition of 1951, none could be found. While the Laysan rail probably did not survive on the island for long after the storm, it had been introduced to Midway Atoll, but went extinct there too by 1945 because rats (which preyed on eggs, chicks, and perhaps adults) were introduced accidentally during US military construction beginning in 1940.
