= Tanager expedition =

Series of five biological surveys of the Northwestern Hawaiian Islands

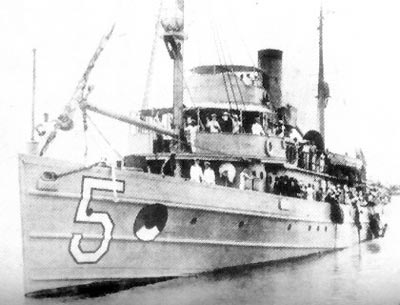
USS Tanager (AM-5)

The Tanager expedition was a series of five biological surveys of the Northwestern Hawaiian Islands conducted in partnership between the Bureau of Biological Survey and the Bishop Museum, with the assistance of the United States Navy. Four expeditions occurred from April to August 1923, and a fifth in July 1924. Led by Lieutenant Commander Samuel Wilder King on the minesweeper USS Tanager (AM-5), and Alexander Wetmore directing the team of scientists, the expedition studied the plant animal life, and geology of the central Pacific islands. Noted members of the team include archaeologist Kenneth Emory and herpetologist Chapman Grant.

The expedition began with the goal of exterminating domestic rabbits that had been introduced to Laysan island by the guano industry in 1902. Since that time, the rabbits had devoured Laysan's vegetation and led to the extinction of several endemic species. The rabbits were eventually eliminated on Laysan, and the crew witnessed the extinction of the Laysan honeycreeper. Throughout the expedition, new species were discovered and named, and unique specimens were captured and returned to laboratories for further study. Over 100 archaeological sites were found, including ancient religious sites and prehistoric settlements on Nīhoa and Necker Island.

== First expedition ==
The first expedition departed Honolulu on April 4, 1923, and returned on May 4. The team visited the island of Laysan, Pearl and Hermes Atoll, Midway Atoll, and Kure Atoll. When they spent a month on Laysan studying the endemic Laysan honeycreeper, a violent and sudden storm ravaged the island. After the storm, the crew concluded that the last three specimens of the honeycreeper had been killed.

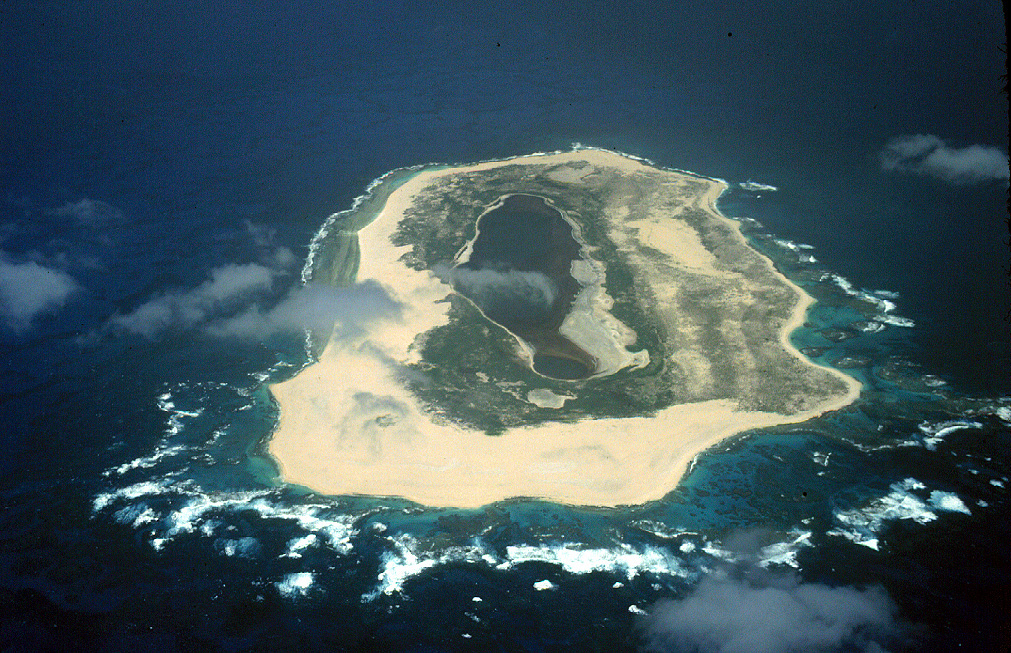
Laysan island

=== Crew ===
- Alexander Wetmore (assistant biologist)
- Stanley C. Ball (biologist)
- J. W. Thompson (Bishop Museum)
- David T. Fullaway (entomologist)
- David Thaanum (conchologist)
- Edward L. Caum (botanist)
- Donald Ryder Dickey (photographer)
- Charles E. Reno (rodent control specialist)
- John Baker
- Chapman Grant (Ornithology assistant, herpetologist)
- Eric Schlemmer (general utility)

== Second expedition ==
The second expedition departed Honolulu on May 10. The team visited the island of Laysan, the French Frigate Shoals and the Pearl and Hermes Atoll.

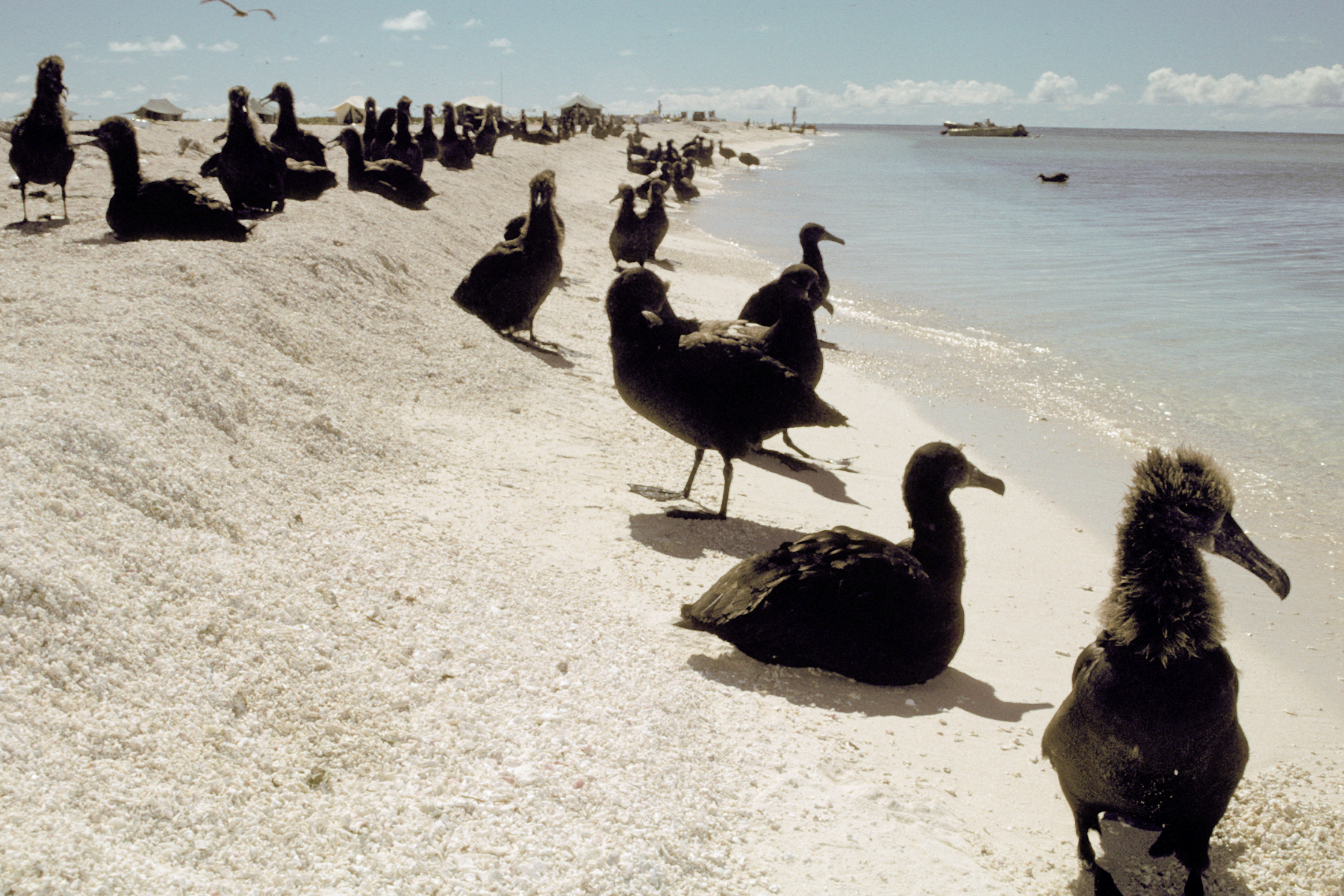
Pearl and Hermes Atoll

=== Crew ===
- Alexander Wetmore (assistant biologist)
- Stanley C. Ball (biologist)
- J. W. Thompson (Bishop Museum)
- David T. Fullaway (entomologist)
- David Thaanum (conchologist)
- Edward L. Caum (botanist)
- Donald Ryder Dickey (photographer)
- Charles E. Reno (rodent control specialist)
- John Baker
- Chapman Grant (Ornithology assistant, herpetologist)
- Eric Schlemmer (general utility)
- L. A. Thurston
- Gerrit P. Wilder (botanist)
- F. R. Lawrence
- Ted. Dranga
- Austin Jones

== Third expedition ==
The third expedition departed Honolulu on June 9. The team visited the islands of Necker, Nīhoa, and the French Frigate Shoals. An attempt was also made to visit Kaʻula. Tanager arrived at Nīhoa on June 10 and dropped off scientists for a ten-day visit and moved on to Necker the following day to drop off a second team. Both teams used radio to keep in constant communication between the two islands. On Nīhoa, botanist Edward Leonard Caum collected the first specimen of Amaranthus brownii and Alexander Wetmore discovered the Nīhoa millerbird and named it Acrocephalus familiaris kingi, in honor of Captain Samuel Wilder King. Evidence of an ancient settlement on Nīhoa was discovered, along with platforms, terraces, and human remains.

On June 22, the Tanager arrived in the French Frigate Shoals and remained for six days, completing the first comprehensive survey of the atoll. The expedition returned to Honolulu on July 1.

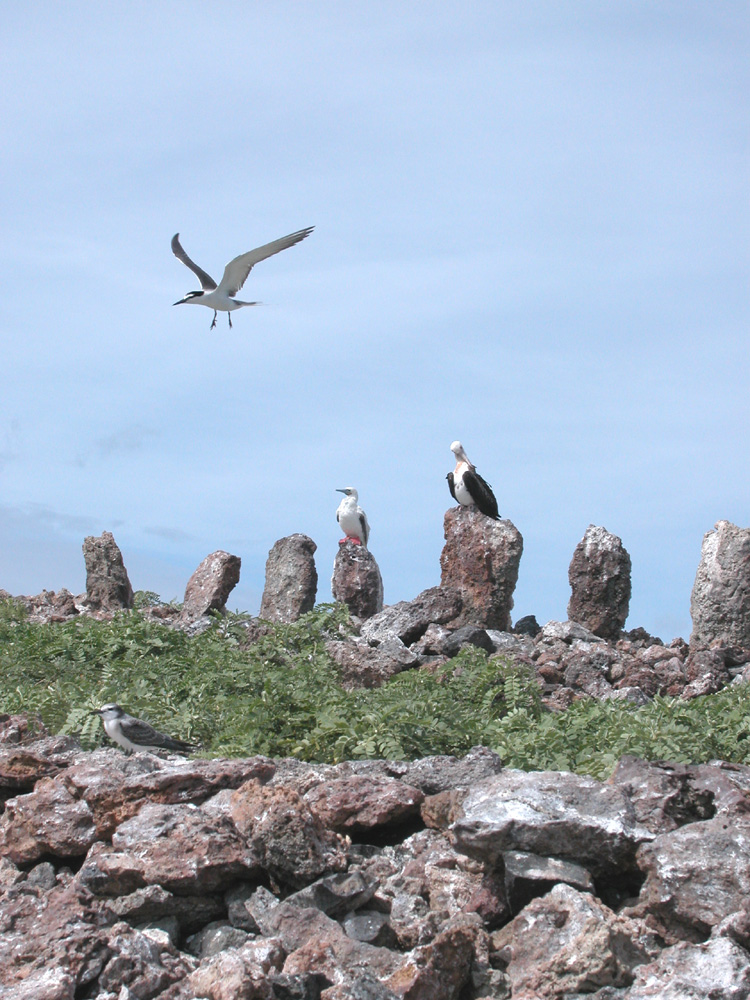
Necker Island

=== Crew ===
- C. S. Judd (cartographer)
- C. M. Cooke (conchologist)
- E. H. Bryan Jr. (entomologist)
- H. S. Palmer (geologist)
- Edward Leonard Caum (botanist)
- Kenneth Emory (archaeologist)
- A. L. C. Atkinson
- Bruce Cartwright
- A. G. Rice
- W. G. Anderson

== Fourth expedition ==
The fourth expedition consisted of two teams, with the first departing Honolulu on July 7. Destinations included Johnston Atoll and Wake Island. The first team left on the Whippoorwill (AM-35), which made the first survey of Johnston Island in the 20th century. Aerial survey and mapping flights over Johnston were conducted with a Douglas DT-2 floatplane carried on her fantail, which was hoisted into the water for take off. Two destroyer convoys accompanied the expedition from Honolulu. The Tanager (AM-5) left Honolulu on July 16 and joined up with the Whippoorwill to complete the survey. From July 27 to August 5, the expedition surveyed Wake Island and named its islets: The southwest islet was named after Charles Wilkes who had led the United States Exploring Expedition in 1841 and determined the location of Wake Island. The northwest islet was named after Titian Peale, the chief naturalist for the 1841 expedition.

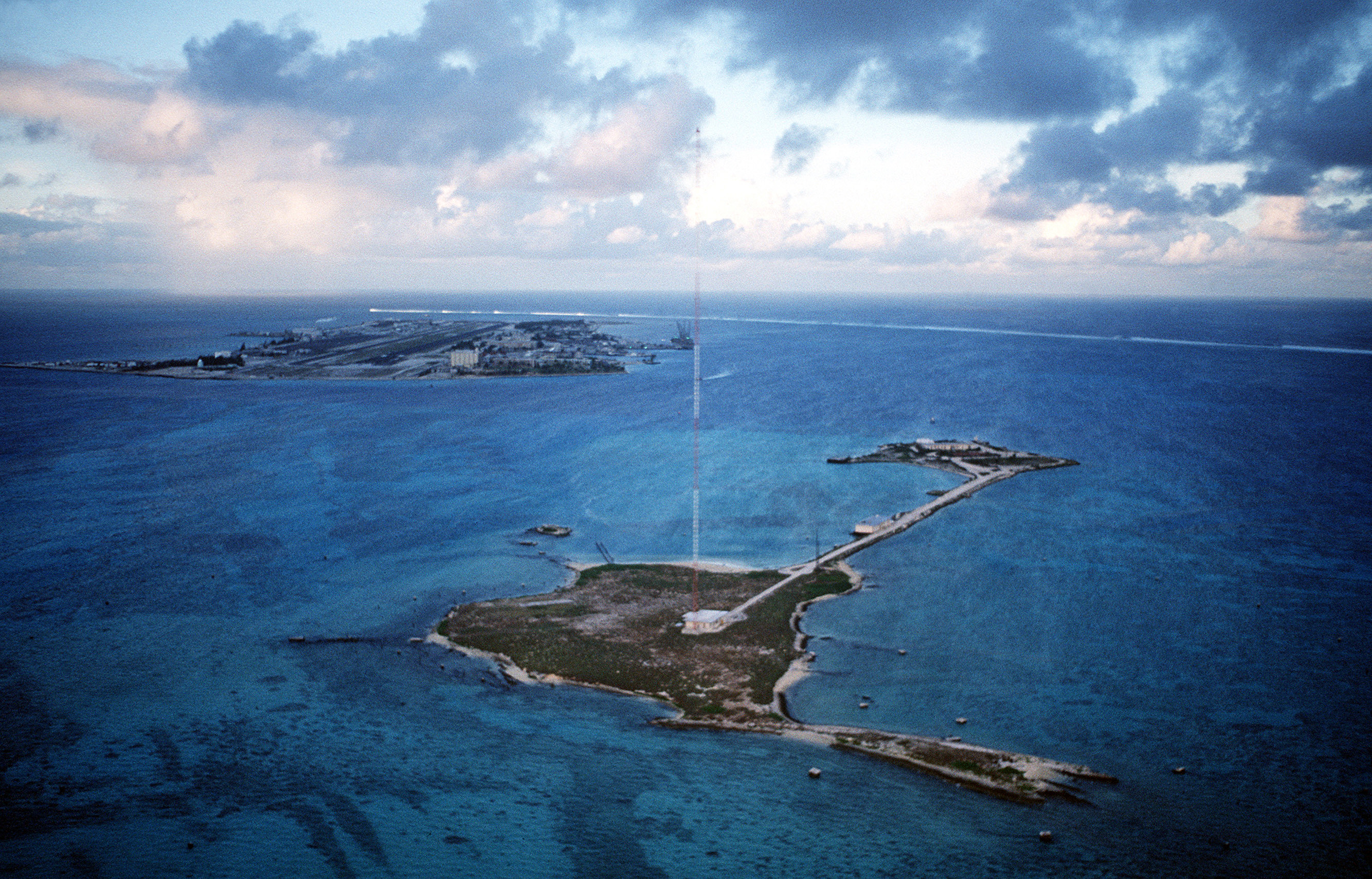
Johnston Atoll

=== Crew ===
==== Whippoorwill ====
- Alexander Wetmore (assistant biologist)
- Charles Howard Edmonson (marine biologist)
- Jas. B. Pollock (botanist)
- E. H. Bryan Jr.
- W. G. Anderson
- Max Schlemmer Jr.

==== Tanager ====
- H. S. Palmer
- David Thaanum (conchologist)
- G. R. Mann (surveyor)
- Orme Cheatham

== Fifth expedition ==
The fifth expedition visited Nīhoa and Necker Island in 1924. Archaeologist Kenneth P. Emory of the Bishop Museum cleared out 60 sites on Nīhoa and collected and cataloged artifacts. The expedition visited Necker from July 14–17.

=== Crew ===
This list is incomplete

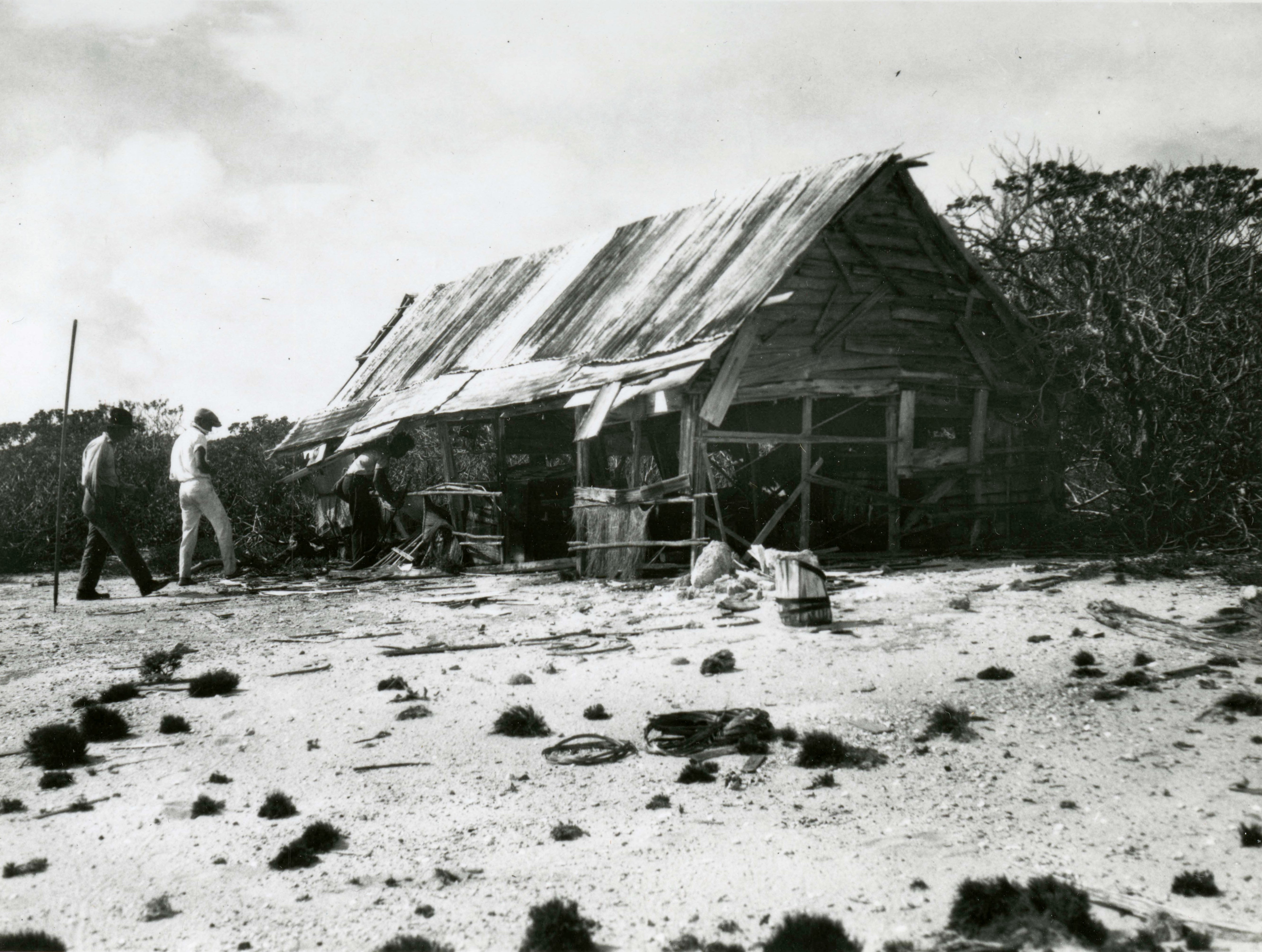
A poacher's workshop on Peale Island, part of Wake Island, as taken by Alexander Wetmore during the expedition

- Stanley C. Ball (biologist)
- E. H. Bryan Jr.
- Edward L. Caum (botanist)
- Erling Christophersen (botanist)
- Donald Ryder Dickey (photographer)
- Kenneth Emory (archaeologist)
- David T. Fullaway (entomologist)
- Chapman Grant (Ornithology assistant, herpetologist)
- Herbert E. Gregory (Director, Bishop Museum)
- C. S. Judd (cartographer)
- A. J. Ker
- Commander Samuel W. King
- Charles E. Reno (rodent control specialist)
- Eric Schlemmer (general utility)
- David Thaanum (conchologist)
- J. W. Thompson (Bishop Museum)
- Alexander Wetmore (assistant biologist)
- Gerrit P. Wilder (botanist)
- T. Wilson

== Repatriation ==
In 1990, the U.S. Congress passed the Native American Graves Protection and Repatriation Act, which requires federal agencies and institutions that receive federal funding to return Native American cultural items and human remains to their people. In the 1990s, Hui Mālama (Hui Mālama I Na Kūpuna O Hawaiʻi Nei), a Native Hawaiian group, spent two years petitioning the United States Fish and Wildlife Service for the release of the bones (iwi) from seven Hawaiian skeletons originally taken from Nīhoa and Necker Island by the Tanager Expedition in 1924. Although the bones were owned by the USFWS, the Bishop Museum acted as custodian. The bones were finally released to the group, and in November 1997, Hui Mālama chartered a yacht and travelled to Nīhoa and Necker to rebury the remains.
