= Kenneth Emory =

American anthropologist (1897–1992)

- Born: 23 November 1897; Fitchburg
- Died: 2 January 1992 (aged 94); Honolulu
- Other names: Keneti
- Alma mater: Dartmouth College; Harvard University; Yale University
- Occupation: Anthropologist, archaeologist, ethnologist
- Employer: Bishop Museum
- Parent(s): Walter Leavitt Emory; Winifred Pike

Kenneth Pike Emory (November 23, 1897 – January 2, 1992) was an American anthropologist who played a key role in shaping modern anthropology in Oceania. In the tradition of A. L. Kroeber and other pioneering anthropologists who trained him, Emory's works span all four major fields of anthropology: archaeology, physical anthropology, ethnography, and linguistics. With fellow scientists Gerrit P. Wilder, Honolulu botanist, and Mrs. Wilder, historian; Dr. Armstrong Sperry and Dr. Stanley Ball, he was part of the Bishop Museum scientific research party who explored the South Pacific on the schooner Kaimiloa.

== Biography ==
Kenneth Pike Emory was born November 23, 1897, in Fitchburg, Massachusetts. He moved to Hawaii when he was two and grew up there, traveling first to Dartmouth and then continued his education afterward at Harvard then received his PhD from Yale. While he was a high-school student, several archaeological digs in the Honolulu area piqued his interest in Polynesian artifacts and culture. Proselytizing in the first half of the nineteenth century by Roman Catholic, Protestant, and Mormon missionaries had been so successful that by the 1920s Polynesians had abandoned their ancestral gods in all but a few isolated places. When Emory realized this, he dedicated his life to finding and documenting as much pre-Christian Polynesian culture as he could. After attending Dartmouth College, he became associated with the Bishop Museum.

In 1924, with a group of Hawaiʻi scientists (including Gerrit P. Wilder, botanist; Mrs. Wilder, historian; Dr. Armstrong Sperry, writer and illustrator; Dr. Stanley Ball), he joined the four masted 170-foot 512 tons vessel Kaimiloa in Honolulu for a five-year expedition, reaching many of the then inaccessible spots of the Pacific. The vessel was a complete floating laboratory, possibly the most complete of any craft that has undertaken a similar trip. Bottles, crates, and boxes are stowed below along with gallons of preservatives for insects and plant specimens for the Bishop Museum. He then spent the next 60 years roaming the Pacific, seeking out Polynesian settlement sites, excavating relics, and photographing petroglyphs. He sought out Polynesians who remembered the pre-Christian chants and rituals, and recorded them on film. By the 1950s, he had become the world's foremost expert on Polynesian culture.

Emory theorized that Polynesians were descended from the Māori of New Zealand, and that Polynesian culture originated in Tonga and Samoa and migrated eastward through the Pacific to Tahiti, the Marquesas, and Hawaii. Emory believed, but did not attempt to prove, that Polynesians were capable of sailing great distances to all points of the compass. He argued that when the population of an island exceeded its capacity, a king or noble would outfit a large oceangoing vessel and set off to verify rumors of other habitable islands, sending back word of his discovery. Emory believed the Hawaiian Islands had been colonized by Society Islanders (Tahitians) in this way. With Kon-Tiki, Thor Heyerdahl proved that ancient mariners could have sailed westward across the Pacific; Emory replied that Peruvians might have gotten as far west as Easter Island, but its culture was overwhelmingly Polynesian. Others argued that even if Tahitians had found a new land mass such as Hawaii, they would have been unable to return to their point of origin. Emory disagreed, pointing out that contemporary copra schooners relied on wave direction, ocean currents, and seabirds to guide them to land, and Polynesian legends made frequent reference to celestial navigation. Besides: "If they sailed south they were bound to hit islands whose inhabitants would know where the Society Islands lay."

Emory's parents were from Massachusetts. By the time of his birth, Honolulu offered every amenity that could be found in any American city, and regular steamship service connected the city with San Francisco and other Pacific ports. Hawaiians accepted the inevitable presence of haole (Anglos) on their islands, partly because "It is now much easier for (Hawaiians) to live . . . than in the old strenuous days when famine and war were never far off." In Hawaii intermarriage was relatively rare, but in Tahiti intermarriage between French and Tahitians was quite common. Emory married a woman whose mother's family was Tahitian and whose father's was French; she considered Paris her second home.

In 1947, Emory spent time on Kapingamarangi, a remote Micronesian atoll, which, from his description, approached Rousseau's ideal society: "This traditional lifestyle supported five hundred people on land . . . that did not total more than six-tenths of a square mile. There was no crime. . . . The people . . . were courteous, hospitable, hard-working, . . . and superbly adjusted to their environment.

Emory died January 2, 1992, in Honolulu.

== Selected bibliography ==
- Emory, Kenneth P. 1933. Stone remains in the Society Islands. Bulletin 116. Honolulu: Bernice P. Bishop Museum.
- Emory, Kenneth P. 1934. "Archaeology of the Pacific Equatorial Islands." In Bishop Museum Bulletin 123. Honolulu: Bernice P. Bishop Museum.
- Emory, Kenneth P. 1943. "Polynesian stone remains." In Studies in the Anthropology of Oceania and Asia, presented in memory of Roland Burrage Dixon, edited by James M. Andrews. Cambridge, Mass., The Museum.
- Emory, Kenneth Pike, and Yosihiko H. Sinoto. 1961. Oahu excavations. Honolulu: Bishop Museum Press.
- Emory, Kenneth Pike. 1965. Kapingamarangi, social and religious life of a Polynesian atoll. Honolulu, The Museum.
- Emory, Kenneth Pike. 1969. The island of Lanai: A survey of native culture. Honolulu: Bishop Museum Press Reprints.
- Emory, Kenneth Pike. 1971. Archaeology of Mangareva and neighbouring atolls. New York: Kraus Reprint. ISBN 0-527-02271-3
- Emory, Kenneth Pike and Maude, Honor. 1979. String figures of the Tuamotus. Canberra: Homa Press. ISBN 0-9596111-1-8
- Emory, Kenneth Pike. 2002. Archaeology of Nihoa and Necker Islands. Honolulu: Bishop Museum Press, Mutual Publishing. ISBN 1-56647-565-1

== See also ==
- Tanager Expedition
- Kaimiloa Expedition
