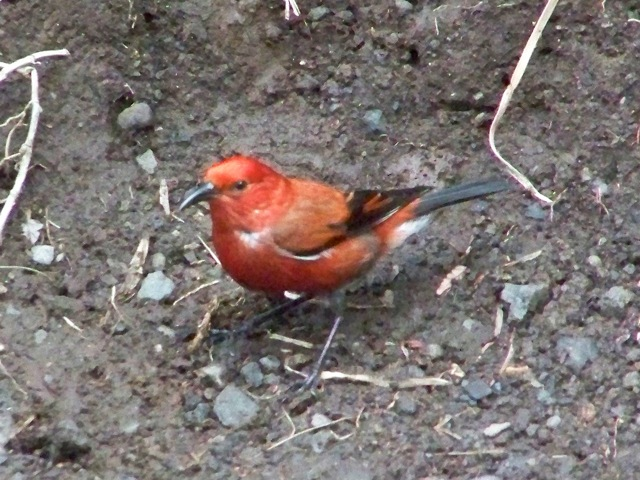
- ʻApapane (Himatione sanguinea)

Scientific classification
- Kingdom: Animalia
- Phylum: Chordata
- Class: Aves
- Order: Passeriformes
- Family: Fringillidae
- Subfamily: Carduelinae
- Genus: Himatione; Cabanis, 1851

Type species
- Certhia sanguinea Gmelin, 1788

Species
- See text

= Himatione =

Genus of birds

Himatione is a genus of Hawaiian honeycreepers in the subfamily Carduelinae of the family Fringillidae.

== Species ==
It contains the following two species:

| Image | Common name | Scientific name |
|---|---|---|
| | †Laysan honeycreeper | †Himatione fraithii, extinct 1923 |
| | ʻApapane | Himatione sanguinea |

== See also ==
- Hawaiian honeycreepers
