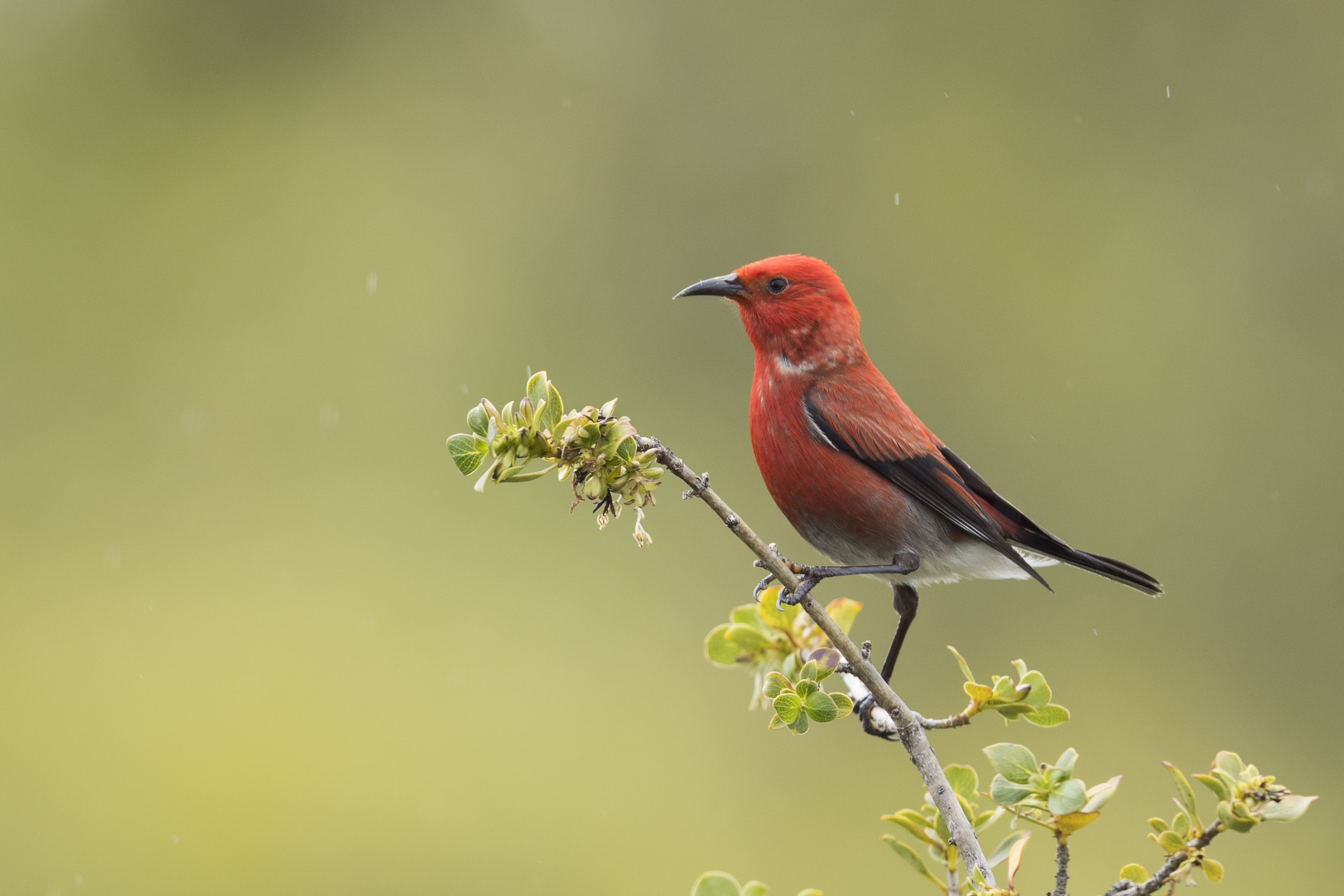
- 'Apapane on pilo

Conservation status
- Least Concern (IUCN 3.1)

Scientific classification
- Kingdom: Animalia
- Phylum: Chordata
- Class: Aves
- Order: Passeriformes
- Family: Fringillidae
- Subfamily: Carduelinae
- Genus: Himatione
- Species: H. sanguinea

Binomial name
- Himatione sanguinea (Gmelin, 1788)

Subspecies
- Himatione sanguinea sanguinea
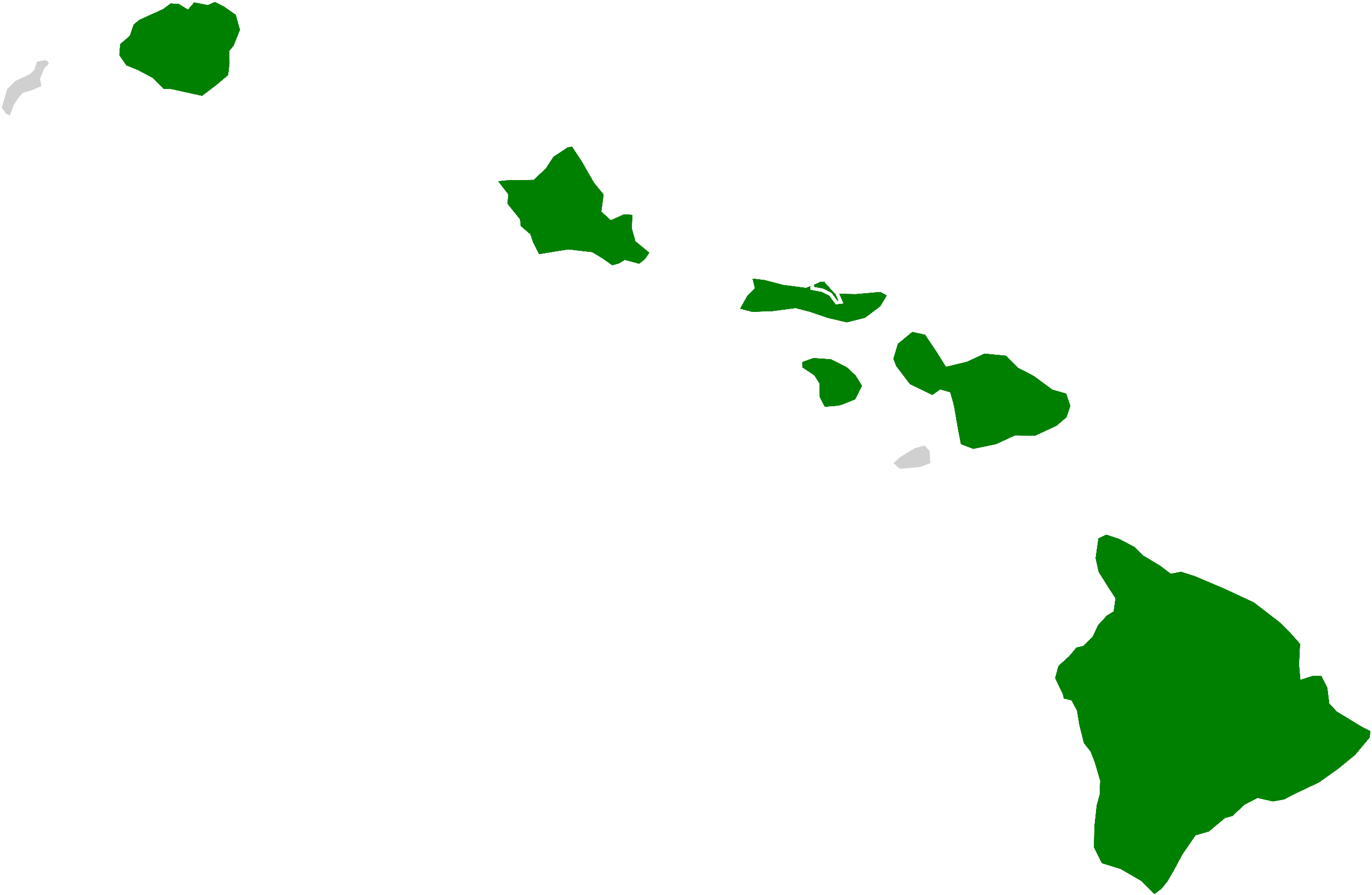

= ʻApapane =

Species of bird

The ʻapapane (/ˌɑːpɑːˈpɑːneɪ/ AH-pah-PAH-nay;) (Himatione sanguinea) is a small, crimson species of Hawaiian honeycreeper endemic to the Hawaiian Islands. They are the most abundant and widely distributed honeycreeper and are found on the islands of Hawaiʻi, Maui, Lānaʻi, Kauaʻi, Molokaʻi and Oʻahu.

ʻApapane commonly forage in the canopies of ʻōhiʻa (Metrosideros polymorpha) trees, drinking nectar from the flowers and serving as important pollinators. Hawaiians primarily used red feathers from ʻiʻiwi, but also some from ʻapapane, to adorn the ʻahuʻula (capes), mahiole (helmets), and nā lei hulu (feather leis) of aliʻi (Hawaiian nobility).

== Description ==
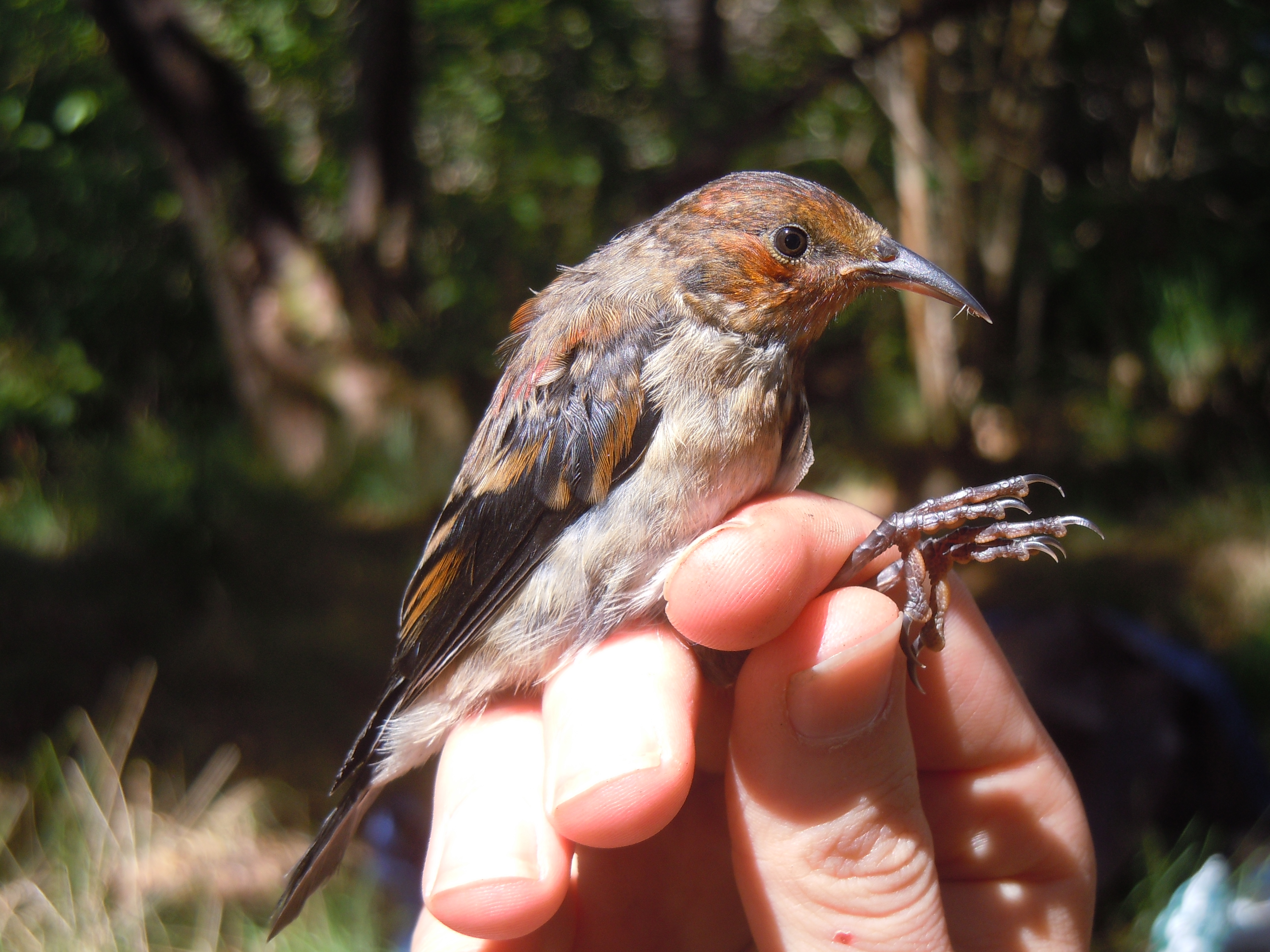
Juvenile ʻapapane

ʻApapane are small at 13 cm (5.1 in) when fully grown. They are sexually dimorphic in size: male ʻapapane have a mass of 16 g (0.56 oz), while females average 14.4 g (0.51 oz). Adult ʻapapane are overall bright crimson, with distinct white undertail-coverts and lower abdomen feathers. They have black primaries and retricies. Juvenile ʻapapane are yellow-brown and gray, with the same white plumage as adults, and molt into crimson plumage over the course of two years. 'Apapane are often seen in a tail-up posture, showing off their white feathers.

=== Song ===
ʻApapane are active singers, including in flight. There is considerable variation in their calls and songs, but phrases are often repeated. They are known to sing at a perch for 10-30 second intervals, and their song may include repeated squeaks, whistles, rasps, melodic trills, and clicking sounds.

=== Diet ===
ʻApapane have tubular, brush-tipped tongues and decurved bills adapted for nectar feeding. They frequent ʻōhiʻa trees, feeding on the flowers in conspecific and mixed-species flocks, and range widely to followʻōhiʻa flowering phenology. ʻApapane also glean insects and spiders from leaves and small twigs in the canopy; they do not forage on the ground. In 1953, a study of 63 'apapane found that 87% of them had butterflies and moths (Lepidoptera) in their stomachs; 75% had eaten hoppers (Homoptera); 60% ate lacewing larvae (Neuroptera); and 43% had recently consumed spiders (Arachnida). Other native trees that 'apapane use for foraging are māmane (Sophora chrysophylla), koa (Acacia koa), naio (Myoporum sandwicense), kōlea (Myrsine lessertiana), alani (Melicope sp.), kanawao (Broussaisia arguta), koki'o ke'oke'o (Hibiscus arnottianus), and 'ōlapa (Cheirodendron trigynum).

=== Breeding ===
The breeding season starts between October and November, peaking between February and June. ʻApapane nests are often on the terminal branch of ʻōhiʻa; nests have been found in tree cavities and lava tubes as well as in the top of koa, kāwaʻu (Ilex anomala) and hapuʻu (Cibotium tree ferns). The female lays 1-4 eggs and incubates for 13 days. Interestingly, during incubation the male does not visit the nest but will feed the female when she is away from the nest. While the female does not sing or call from the nest, she locates her singing male and begs for food. Once the eggs hatch, nestlings are fed by both parents. Young 'apapane are dependent on their parents for less than 4 months.

=== Habitat and distribution ===
ʻApapane are found in native mesic and wet forests dominated by ʻōhiʻa and koa trees. Their range is extensive and their densities change as they undergo frequent temporal and seasonal migrations in search of flowering ʻōhiʻa. They are detected at low elevations on most islands, however, most ʻapapane are found at elevations above 4,100 feet (1,200 m), where there are fewer mosquitoes and therefore less disease pressure. 'Apapane live on the islands of Hawaiʻi (~86% of the population: 1,080,000 ± 25,000 est. 1986), Maui (228,480 ± 19,855 est. 2017 for East Maui and 20,521 ± 1,687 est. 2009 for West Maui), Kauaʻi (98,506 est. 2012), Molokaʻi (38,643 ± 2,360 est. 1979), Oʻahu (24,000 ± 2,600 est. 1991), and Lānaʻi (540 ± 213 est. 1979). Their populations are stable and are considered a species of least concern by IUCN.

== Threats and conservation ==
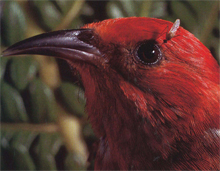
A mosquito taking a blood meal from an 'apapane

'Apapane are the most abundant honeycreeper species with the largest range. The total population has been estimated at more than 1.5 million individuals with the largest populations on Hawaii and Maui Islands. The main threats for 'apapane are habitat loss, disease and the introduction of alien species. 'Apapane can be found on all of the main Hawaiian Islands except Niihau and Kaho'olawe, where it is primarily found at high elevations where rates of avian malaria are comparatively low. The species is also threatened by non-native mammalian predators such as Small Indian mongooses, rats, and feral cats. The species has the highest reported prevalence of avian malaria (Plasmodium relictum), but their mortality is lower than most other honeycreeper species. Their high infection prevalence may be the result of their seasonal migrations to lower elevation forests putting individuals in contact with mosquitoes, particularly the introduced southern house mosquito, the primary vector of avian malaria, which are less common at higher elevations. 'Apapane are therefore suspected to be a significant reservoir for malaria transmission. P. relictum is a blood parasite, and host death is usually caused by anemia. Avian pox, which causes wart-like lesions to form around a bird's eyes, beak, legs, or feet, may also be lethal to ʻapapane if the lesions inhibit feeding, seeing, or perching. Like avian malaria, avian pox is transmitted by mosquitoes and birds infected with one are often coinfected with the other. The synergistic effects of co-infection may have additional impacts on infected 'apapane's survival. It is believed that at least a small portion of the population is becoming resistant to malaria, as some pairs have been seen breeding in mid-elevation forests, ~300m, where the rate of malaria transmission is high.

Today there are no direct actions being taken concerning this species. However, conservation actions to help rarer species of birds throughout Hawaii will also help the ʻapapane. Organizations throughout the islands have established nature reserves to protect native habitats. Fencing off sections of land to keep out feral ungulates, especially pigs, goats, and axis deer enables native plants to recover from overgrazing and helps restore native bird habitat.

In recent years another threat has put native bird habitat at risk. Conservation groups are diligently working to reduce the risk of spreading a fungal disease called Rapid ʻŌhiʻa Death (ROD). This disease, along with ʻōhiʻa dieback and ʻōhiʻa rust, could lead to a rapid decline in ʻōhiʻa forests, an important nectar source for ʻapapane.
