= USS Tanager (AM-5) =

Minesweeper of the United States Navy

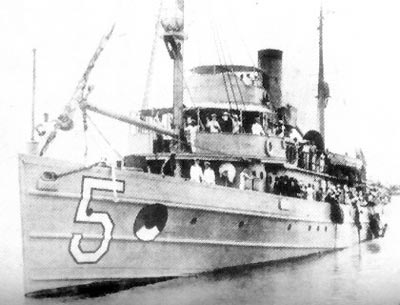

History

United States
- Name: USS Tanager
- Builder: Staten Island Shipbuilding Company
- Laid down: 28 September 1917
- Launched: 2 March 1918
- Commissioned: 28 June 1918, as Minesweeper No.5
- Reclassified: AM-5, 17 July 1920
- Stricken: 8 May 1942
- Honours and awards: 1 battle star (World War II)
- Fate: Sunk by Bataan shore fire, 4 May 1942

General characteristics
- Class & type: Lapwing-class minesweeper
- Displacement: 840 long tons (853 t)
- Length: 187 ft 10 in (57.25 m)
- Beam: 35 ft 6 in (10.82 m)
- Draft: 10 ft 4 in (3.15 m)
- Speed: 14 knots (26 km/h; 16 mph)
- Complement: 85
- Armament: 2 × 3 in (76 mm) guns

USS Tanager (AM-5) was an Lapwing-class minesweeper acquired by the U.S. Navy for the task of removing mines from minefields laid in the water to prevent ships from passing.

Tanager was named by the U.S. Navy after the tanager, one of numerous American passerine birds.

Tanager (Minesweeper No. 5) was laid down on 28 September 1917 at New York City, by the Staten Island Shipbuilding Co.; launched on 2 March 1918; sponsored by Mrs. G. H. Bates; and commissioned on 28 June 1918.

== World War I Atlantic operations ==
After operating locally out of Boston, Massachusetts through the late summer of 1918, Tanager, in company with Western King, departed New London, Connecticut, on 26 September 1918, bound for the Azores. The minesweeper subsequently operated out of Punta Delgada on local escort duties with the Azores detachment through the fall, before pushing on toward Portugal and reaching Lisbon on the day after Christmas 1918. Later in her tour in European waters, she delivered a case of serum to Georgia (Battleship No. 15) which was trying to combat an outbreak of influenza.

In the spring, Tanager was assigned to the mine-sweeping detachment established to clear the North Sea Mine Barrage between the shores of Scotland and Norway, and arrived at Kirkwall, Scotland, on 7 May 1919. The barrage – which had been laid during World War I to prevent a sortie by the German High Seas Fleet and forays by German U-boats – now prevented the resumption of the commercial shipping which had criss-crossed the North Sea before the war.

While sweeping Group 9, the third operation conducted by the mine force, Tanager suffered damage in heavy weather and was forced to put into Kirkwall for a week of repairs. Besides the hazards posed by the stormy North Sea, the mines provided their own particular brand of danger.

== Damaged by a near-miss mine ==
While sweeping Group 10 late in June 1919, Tanager fouled a mine in one of her "kites"; and it exploded close aboard, forcing the ship to limp to Kirkwall for repairs. The severity of her damage required a period in the Admiralty dock at Chatham.

By late summer, the barrage had been swept. In company with other vessels of her squadron, Tanager sailed for the United States on 1 October 1919 and – after stops at Brest, France; Lisbon; and Hamilton, Bermuda – arrived at New York on 19 November 1919. For part of the voyage, from Lisbon to Hamilton, she towed submarine chaser SC-272.

== Stateside repairs ==
Upon completion of permanent repairs at Charleston, South Carolina, Tanager was assigned to the U.S. Pacific Fleet in December 1919. She was reclassified AM-5 on 17 July 1920.

== Pacific Ocean assignment ==
The minesweeper steamed to the Hawaiian Islands and operated out of Pearl Harbor from 1920 to 1941. Her services for the Fleet included target-towing, participation in mine-laying and minesweeping exercises, and transportation of men and mail. In addition, she took part in the Tanager Expeditions to Necker Island and Nīhoa Island in the Hawaiian chain and operated briefly at Wake Island in the summer of 1923 during an ornithological survey. In August 1925, she served on a plane guard station for the PN flying boats' unsuccessful flight from the West Coast of the United States to Hawaii.

Her routine duties at Pearl Harbor were twice interrupted. In early 1928, she was assigned duty as station ship at Pago Pago, Samoa; and, late in March, she unsuccessfully attempted to free SS Steelmaker, aground on Mitchell Island. In 1930, Tanager operated between Mare Island, California and San Diego, for a time, towing and assisting in the preparation of many decommissioned flush-deck, four-pipe destroyers for inactive berthing at the Destroyer Base at the latter place.

== World War II Pacific Theatre operations ==
In early 1941, Tanager received a major overhaul which transformed her silhouette. Her heavy foremast and boom were removed; splinter-shielding was added around her guns and upper bridge; and a depth-charge track was fitted astern. Thus outfitted, she lost excess topside weight and had better fields of fire for her anti-aircraft battery. Assigned to Mine Division 9, Asiatic Fleet, Tanager sailed from Pearl Harbor on 11 May 1941, bound for the Asiatic Station. The minecraft proceeded via Guam to the Philippines. En route, she plane-guarded for two PBY's being flown out as reinforcements for Admiral Thomas C. Hart's air patrol forces.

Calling at Guam from 29 to 30 May 1941, Tanager arrived at Manila on 5 June 1941. She commenced local operations almost immediately and, for the next few months, made patrols off the Corregidor minefields; towed targets for destroyer and submarine exercises; and conducted minesweeping and minelaying duties. From October through December 1941, Tanager participated in the laying of an anti-submarine net across Mariveles Bay, Bataan – a difficult operation accomplished in spite of the fact that there were no specialized net-laying craft in the Philippines.

=== Japanese planes attack the fleet in the Philippines ===
On 7 December 1941, Japanese planes struck Pearl Harbor and plunged the United States into the Pacific War. On the next day, Japanese planes destroyed General Douglas MacArthur's Far East Air Force on the ground on its Philippine fields and struck the Cavite Navy Yard on the 10th. Tanager lay alongside Machina Wharf when the high-level bombers came over. In the attack, the minesweeper managed to leave the area.

Others were not so fortunate. The minesweeper Bittern was wrecked; the submarine Sealion was sunk alongside a pier; and the destroyers Peary and Pillsbury were damaged. More importantly, Cavite was destroyed as an operating base for the Asiatic Fleet.

With Cavite out of commission and Manila declared an open city on Christmas Day 1941, American and Filipino forces withdrew to Bataan and Corregidor. Tanager carried the equipment and staff of the Commandant, 16th Naval District, Rear Admiral Francis W. Rockwell, to Corregidor during his withdrawal; and she subsequently operated out of Corregidor on inshore patrol duties.

=== Sunk by enemy shore fire ===
In ensuing months, Tanager and her dwindling number of sister ships and former China river gunboats lived a furtive, hunted existence. Tanager served almost until the bitter end. On 4 May 1942, the day of the commencement of the Battle of the Coral Sea, the minesweeper was hit by shore battery fire from Japanese guns emplaced on Bataan. Mortally hit, she sank off Corregidor that day.

== Awards ==
Tanager was struck from the Navy Directory on 8 May 1942 and received one battle star for her service in the Philippine campaign in 1941 and 1942.
