= List of extinct bird species since 1500 =

- Extinct in the wild (EW): 5 species
- Critically endangered (CR): 216 species
- Endangered (EN): 372 species
- Vulnerable (VU): 670 species
- Near threatened (NT): 967 species
- Least concern (LC): 8,767 species
- Data deficient (DD): 37 species
Avian species (IUCN, 2025-2)
- 11,198 extant species have been evaluated
- 11,161 of those are fully assessed (Note: excludes data deficient evaluations.)
- 9,734 are not threatened at present (Note: NT and LC.)
- 1,427 to 1,464 are threatened (Note: Threatened comprises CR, EN and VU. Upper estimate additionally includes DD.)
- 169 to 187 are extinct or extinct in the wild:
  - 164 extinct (EX) species (Note: Chart omits extinct (EX) species)
  - 5 extinct in the wild (EW)
  - 18 possibly extinct [CR(PE)]

About 216 species of birds have become extinct since 1500, with increasing extinction rates due to human-caused influences such as habitat loss, the introduction of invasive species, and climate change. Currently there are approximately 10,000 living species of birds, with over 1,480 at risk of extinction and 223 critically endangered.

Island species in general, and flightless island species in particular, are most at risk. The situation is exemplified by Hawaii, where 30% of all known recently extinct bird taxa originally lived, and Guam, which lost over 60% of its native bird taxa in the decades following the introduction of the brown tree snake (Boiga irregularis). The disproportionate number of extinctions in rails reflects the tendency of that family to lose the ability to fly when geographically isolated. Even more rails became extinct before they could be described by scientists.

The extinction dates given below are usually the dates of the last verified record (credible observation or specimen taken), which are approximations of the actual date of extinction. For many Pacific birds that became extinct shortly after European colonization, however, this leaves an uncertainty period of over 100 years, because the islands on which they lived were only rarely visited by scientists. In certain unusual cases, it is possible to pinpoint the date of extinction to a specific year or even day; the San Benedicto rock wren represents an extreme example where its extinction could be timed with an accuracy of maybe half an hour coinciding with the eruption of Bárcena.

The year 1500 serves as one common threshold of the "modern" era in which species are described scientifically, extinctions are monitored, and globalization has led to increased pressure on species. Taxa which became extinct pre-1500 are listed in List of Late Quaternary prehistoric bird species; prominent examples include the elephant birds (Aepyornis) and moa.

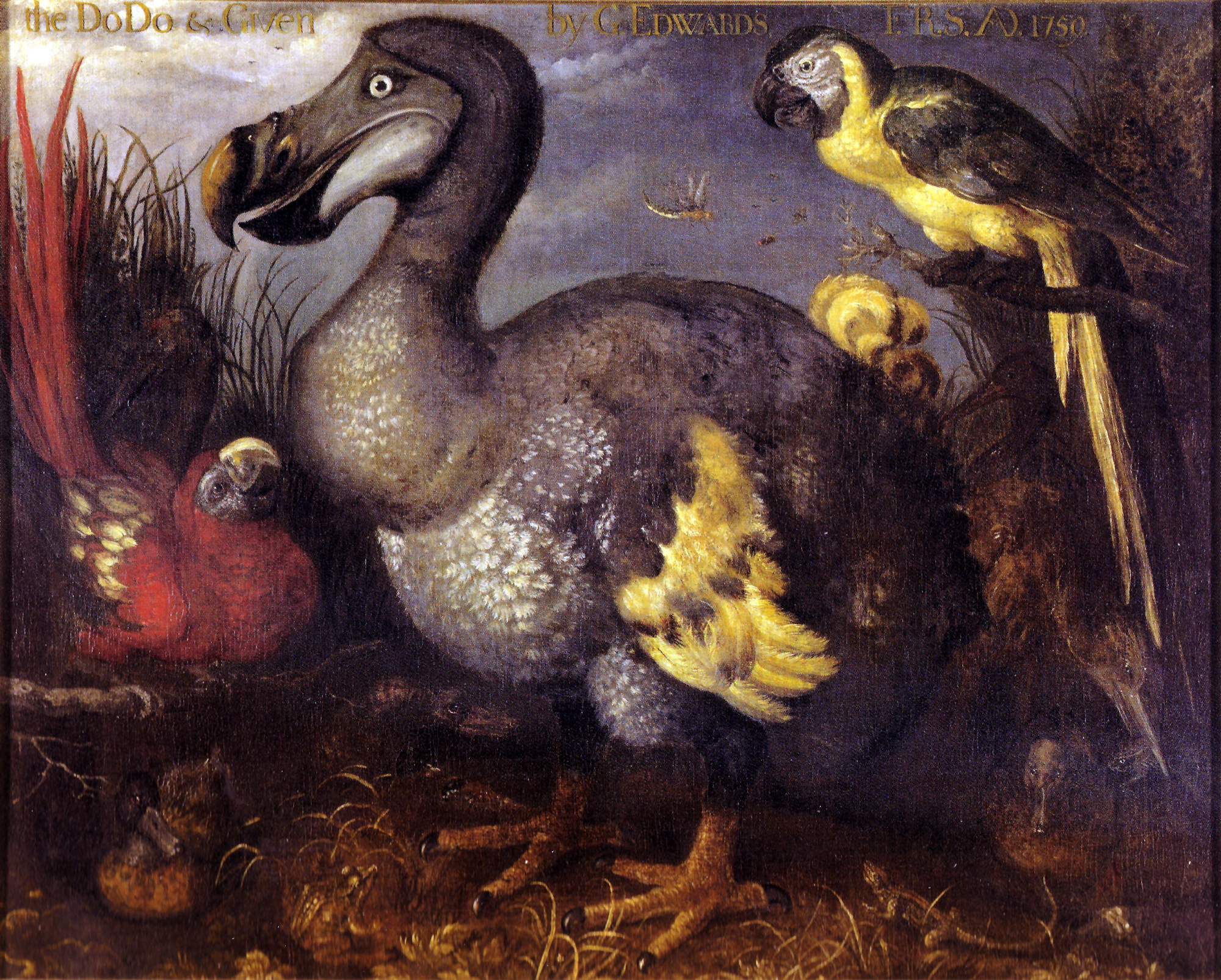
The famous "Edwards' Dodo", painted by Roelant Savery in 1626

== Casuariidae ==
Cassowaries, emus

Dromaius

- Kangaroo Island emu, Dromaius baudinianus (Kangaroo Island, Australia, c. 1819)
- King Island emu, Dromaius minor (King Island (Tasmania), Australia, c. 1802)

== Apterygiformes ==
Kiwis

Apteryx

- West Coast spotted kiwi, Apteryx occidentalis (South Island, New Zealand, c. 1900)

A doubtfully distinct species; may be a subspecies of the little spotted kiwi (Apteryx owenii) or a hybrid between that species and the Okarito kiwi (Apteryx rowi).

== Anseriformes ==
Ducks, geese, swans, screamers

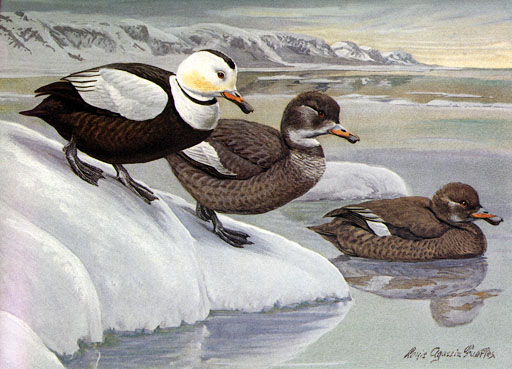
Labrador duck

=== Anatidae ===
Ducks, geese, and swans

Anatinae – ducks

- Tadornini
  - Tadorna – shelducks
    - Crested shelduck, Tadorna cristata (Vladivostok, Russia, 1964)
    A likely relict species from Northeast Asia. Officially critically endangered due to unconfirmed reports made between 1985 and 1990 and poor survey coverage of the regions.
  - Alopochen
    - Réunion sheldgoose, Alopochen kervazoi (Réunion, Mascarenes, late 17th century)
    Poorly known; observed in 1672, declared extinct in 1710.
    - Mauritius sheldgoose, Alopochen mauritianus (Mauritius, Mascarenes, 1693)
    Last reported in 1693, declared extinct in 1698.
- Mergini – sea ducks
  - †Camptorhynchus – Labrador duck
    - Labrador duck, Camptorhynchus labradorius (Long Island, New York, 1875)
    1875 is generally regarded as the last documented sighting of this species, though reports of an individual being shot in Elmita, New York in 1878 are sometimes accepted. Causes of extinction are poorly known, but at least partly driven by hunting.
  - Mergus – mergansers
    - Auckland Island merganser, Mergus australis (New Zealand and the Auckland Islands, Southwest Pacific, c. 1902)
    Driven to extinction by predation by introduced mammals and hunting.
- Aythyini – diving ducks
  - Chenonetta
    - Finsch's duck, Chenonetta finschi (New Zealand, c. 1760)
    Causes of extinction included predation by rats and overhunting. One unconfirmed record from 1870.
  - Rhodonessa – pink-headed duck
    - Pink-headed duck, Rhodonessa caryophyllacea (East India, Bangladesh, North Myanmar, c. 1945)
    Sometimes included in genus Netta, but this classification is not generally accepted. Population declined sharply in early 20th century due to habitat loss and hunting. Officially classified as critically endangered due to the possibility of remaining individuals in remote portions of northern Myanmar, where unconfirmed reports have continued into the 21st century.
  - Aythya
    - Réunion pochard, Aythya cf. innotata (Réunion, Mascarenes, 17th century)
    Undescribed extinct species only known from two subfossils and two historical reports (1687, 1710) of non-Mascarene teal ducks on Réunion.
- Anatini – dabbling ducks
  - Mareca – wigeons
    - Amsterdam wigeon, Mareca marecula (Amsterdam Island, South Indian Ocean, 1793)
    Driven to extinction by habitat destruction, hunting, and the introduction of invasive species.
  - Anas
    - Saint Paul Island duck, Anas sp. (St. Paul Island, South Indian Ocean, c. 1800)
    Only known from a single report from 1793. May be synonymous with the Amsterdam wigeon or a distinct species or subspecies.
    - Mascarene teal, Anas theodori (Mauritius and Réunion, Mascarenes, 1710)
    Extinction caused by rapid habitat loss, hunting, and introduction of invasive species.
    - Mariana mallard, Anas oustaleti (Marianas, West Pacific, 1981)
    Often considered a subspecies of the mallard (Anas platyrhynchos) or a hybrid with the Pacific black duck (Anas superciliosa) Hunting and habitat loss were both responsible for extinction. Captive breeding conservation efforts were unsuccessful.

Other Anseriformes

- Tahitian "goose", perhaps Nesochen (now Branta) sp. (Tahiti, Society Islands, South Pacific, last seen ca. 1790)

Early travelers to Tahiti reported a "goose" that was found in the mountains. Jean-Marie Derscheid, upon reexamining the notes of these explorers, concluded that it may have been an undescribed species of Nesochen goose.

== Galliformes ==
Landfowl

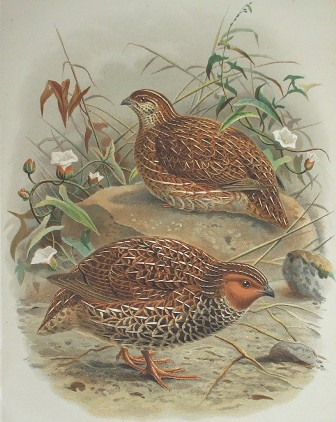
New Zealand quail

Megapodiidae – megapodes

- Megapodius
  - Raoul Island scrubfowl, Megapodius sp. (Raoul Island, Kermadec Islands, 1876)
  Megapodes were reported to have inhabited Raoul Island until the population was wiped out in a volcanic eruption in 1876. It is not clear whether the birds represent a distinct taxon, but given the island's history of major volcanic eruptions, it is unlikely an endemic species would have arisen there.

Phasianidae – pheasants and allies

- Coturnix
  - New Zealand quail, Coturnix novaezelandiae (New Zealand, 1875)
  Causes of extinction involved introduced diseases, competition with invasive species, and agricultural burning.
- Ophrysia – Himalayan quail
  - Himalayan quail, Ophrysia superciliosa (North India, late 19th century)
  Last confirmed sighting in 1876. Officially critically endangered due to ongoing unconfirmed sightings and sparse survey coverage in the historical range. Reasons for decline and possible extinction not well known, but may include hunting and habitat destruction.

== Caprimulgiformes ==
Nightjars

Siphonorhis

- Jamaican poorwill, Siphonorhis americana (Jamaica, c. 1860)

The last documented sighting of this species is from 1860. Species is officially classified as critically endangered, possibly extinct, due to continuing unconfirmed reports and the difficulty of surveying for cryptic species.

Caprimulgus

- Vaurie's nightjar, Caprimulgus centralasicus (China, c. 1929)

Known from a single specimen from Xinjiang, China taken in 1929, originally identified as an Egyptian nightjar (Caprimulgus aegyptius). It was later described as a new species by Charles Vaurie, with its small size compared to other Caprimulgus species being diagnostic. The status of this species is disputed; genetic analysis indicates similarity to the European nightjar (Caprimulgus europaeus), but its small size is "difficult to rationalize".

Eurostopodus

- New Caledonian nightjar, Eurostopodus exul (New Caledonia, c.1939)

Known only from holotype, collected in 1939 and initially described as a subspecies of white-throated nightjar; currently classified as critically endangered, but searches in 1998 and annually since 2010 have failed to find any evidence of extant populations.

== Aegotheliformes ==
Owlet-nightjars

Aegotheles

- New Caledonian owlet-nightjar, Aegotheles savesi (New Caledonia, c. 1913)

Not to be confused with the New Caledonian nightjar. The species is currently listed as critically endangered. The type specimen was collected after the bird flew into a bedroom in the village of Tonghoué. This large owlet-nightjar is known from two specimens taken in 1880 and 1913, though unconfirmed reports have occurred as recently as 1998.

== Apodiformes ==
Swifts and hummingbirds

Trochilidae – hummingbirds

- Riccordia
  - Brace's emerald, Riccordia bracei (New Providence, Bahamas, c. 1877)
  - Gould's emerald, Riccordia elegans (Jamaica (probably), c. 1860)
  Known from single type specimen. Species status is disputed, partly due to unknown provenance of the specimen.
- Eriocnemis
  - Turquoise-throated puffleg, Eriocnemis godini (Ecuador, 19th century)
  Classified as critically endangered, possibly extinct. There have been no documented sightings since the 19th century, but one unconfirmed record exists from 1976. Surveys in 1980 and 2005 failed to find the species.
- Saucerottia
  - Guanacaste hummingbird, Saucerottia alfaroana (Miravalles Volcano, Costa Rica, c. 1895)
  Classified as critically endangered; no targeted search efforts have been undertaken to relocate the species. Known only from holotype, collected in 1895.

== Cuculiformes ==
Cuckoos

†Nannococcyx

- Saint Helena cuckoo, Nannococcyx psix (St. Helena, c.1550)

Coua – couas, a genus endemic to Madagascar

- Delalande's coua, Coua delalandei (Île Sainte-Marie, Madagascar, c. 1834)

== Columbiformes ==
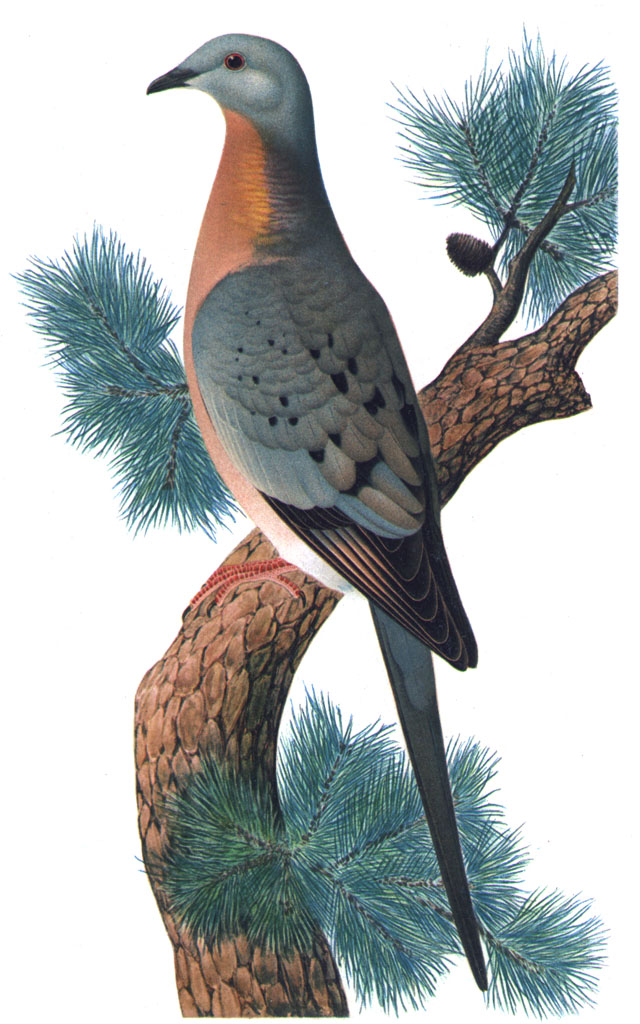
Male passenger pigeon

Pigeons, doves, and dodos
For the "Réunion solitaire", see Réunion ibis.

†Ectopistes – Passenger pigeon

- Passenger pigeon, Ectopistes migratorius (eastern North America, 1914)

The passenger pigeon was once among the most abundant wild bird species in the world, with a single flock numbering up to 2.2 billion birds. It was hunted close to extinction for food and sport in the late 19th century. The last individual, a mateless female named Martha after Martha Washington, died in the Cincinnati Zoo in 1914.

†Dysmoropelia – Saint Helena dove

- Saint Helena dove, Dysmoropelia dekarchiskos (St. Helena, South Atlantic, 16th century?)

Known only from Late Pleistocene bones, but may have persisted until the 16th century.

†Raphus – Dodo

- Dodo, Raphus cucullatus (Mauritius, Mascarenes, late 17th century)

Called Didus ineptus by Linnaeus. A metre-high flightless bird found on Mauritius. Its forest habitat was destroyed when Dutch settlers moved to the island and the dodo's nests and eggs were destroyed by the pigs, cats and monkeys that the Dutch brought with them. The last specimen was killed in 1681, only 80 years after the arrival of the new predators.

†Pezophaps – Rodrigues solitaire

- Rodrigues solitaire, Pezophaps solitaria (Rodrigues, Mascarenes, c. 1730)

Columba

- Bonin wood pigeon, Columba versicolor (Nakodo-jima and Chichi-jima, Ogasawara Islands, c. 1890)
- Ryukyu wood pigeon, Columba jouyi (Okinawa and Daito Islands, Northwest Pacific, late 1930s)
- Mauritian wood pigeon, Columba thiriouxi (Mauritius, Mascarenes, 1730s)

Described from subfossil remains, it is believed to have become extinct by 1730 due to hunting, predation by introduced black rats, and deforestation. The species has been questioned due to the material being scarce and not completely distinguishable from rock doves introduced to the island in 1639. However, early historical accounts mention the existence of pigeons that were caught with ease.

Nesoenas

- Rodrigues pigeon, Nesoenas rodericanus (Rodrigues, Mascarenes, before 1690?)

Formerly in Streptopelia. Possibly a subspecies of the Malagasy turtle dove (Nesoenas picturatus), this seems to be the bird observed by Leguat. Introduced rats may have caused it to become extinct in the late 17th century.

Caloenas

- Spotted green pigeon, Caloenas maculata (South Pacific or Indian Ocean islands, 1820s)

Also known as the Liverpool pigeon, the only known specimen has been in Liverpool's World Museum since 1851, and was probably collected on a Pacific island for Edward Stanley, 13th Earl of Derby. It has been suggested that this bird came from Tahiti based on native lore about a somewhat similar extinct bird called the titi, but this has not yet been verified.

Gallicolumba

- Sulu bleeding-heart, Gallicolumba menagei (Tawitawi, Philippines, late 1990s?)

Officially classified as critically endangered. Only known from two specimens taken in 1891. There have been a number of unconfirmed reports from all over the Sulu Archipelago in 1995; however, these reports stated that the bird had suddenly undergone a massive decline and, by now, habitat destruction is almost complete. If it is not extinct, this species is certainly very rare, but the ongoing civil war prevents comprehensive surveys.

Pampusana

- Norfolk ground dove, Pampusana norfolciensis (Norfolk Island, Southwest Pacific, c. 1800)
- Tanna ground dove, Pampusana ferruginea (Tanna, Vanuatu, late 18th or 19th century)

Only known from descriptions of two now-lost specimens.

- Thick-billed ground dove, Pampusana salamonis (Makira and Ramos, Solomon Islands, mid-20th century?)

Last recorded in 1927, only two specimens exist. Declared extinct in 2005.

Microgoura

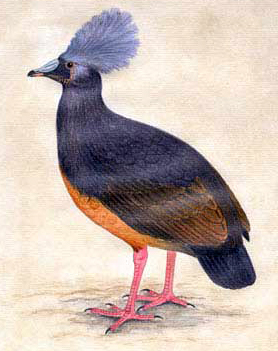
- Choiseul crested pigeon
  Choiseul pigeon, Microgoura meeki (Choiseul, Solomon Islands, early 20th century)

Ptilinopus

- Red-moustached fruit dove, Ptilinopus mercierii (Nuku Hiva and Hiva Oa, Marquesas, 1922)

Two subspecies, the little-known nominate subspecies P. m. mercierii of Nuku Hiva (extinct mid- to late 19th century) and P. m. tristrami of Hiva Oa (1922).

- Negros fruit dove, Ptilinopus arcanus (Negros, Philippines, late 20th century?)

Known only from one specimen taken at the only documented sighting in 1953; the validity of this species has been questioned, but no good alternative to distinct species status has been proposed. Officially classified as critically endangered, it may still exist on Panay, but no survey has located it. One possible record in 2002 does not seem to have been repeated since then.

Alectroenas

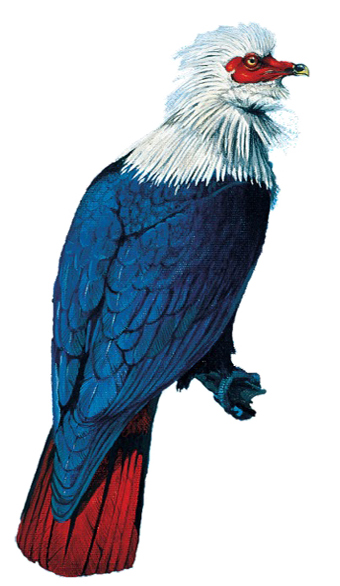
- Mauritius blue pigeon
  Mauritius blue pigeon, Alectroenas nitidissima (Mauritius, Mascarenes, c. 1830s)
- Réunion blue pigeon, Alectroenas sp. (Réunion, Mascarenes, 1619)
- Providence blue pigeon, Alectroenas sp. (Farquhar Group, Seychelles, 19th century)

Only known from early reports; possibly a subspecies of either the Comoros blue pigeon (Alectroenas sganzini) or the Seychelles blue pigeon (Alectroenas pulcherrimus).

Nesoenas

- Mauritian turtle dove, Nesoenas cicur (Mauritius, Mascarenes, 1730s)

Similar to the Malagasy turtle dove but more terrestrial, with more robust legs and smaller wings. Disappeared by 1730 due to hunting, predation by introduced mammals, and deforestation.

== Gruiformes ==
Cranes, rails, finfoots, and trumpeters

†Nesotrochidae

- †Nesotrochis
  - Antillean cave rail, Nesotrochis debooyi
  Known by pre-Columbian bones from Puerto Rico and the United States Virgin Islands. Stories of an easy-to-catch bird named the carrao heard by Alexander Wetmore in 1912 on Puerto Rico may refer to this bird.

Rallidae – rails

- †Diaphorapteryx
  - Hawkins's rail, Diaphorapteryx hawkinsi (Chatham Islands, Southwest Pacific, late 19th century)
- †Aphanapteryx
  - Red rail, Aphanapteryx bonasia (Mauritius, Mascarenes, c. 1700)
- †Erythromachus
  - Rodrigues rail, Erythromachus leguati (Rodrigues, Mascarenes, mid-18th century)
- †Mundia
  - Ascension crake, Mundia elpenor (Ascension Island, South Atlantic, late 17th century) – formerly Atlantisia
- †Aphanocrex
  - Saint Helena rail, Aphanocrex podarces (St. Helena, South Atlantic, 16th century) – formerly Atlantisia
- Dryolimnas
  - Réunion rail or Dubois' wood rail, Dryolimnnas augusti (Réunion, Mascarenes, late 17th century)
- Gallirallus
  - Bar-winged rail, Gallirallus poeciloptera (Fiji, Polynesia, c. 1990)
  - Dieffenbach's rail, Gallirallus dieffenbachii (Chatham Islands, Southwest Pacific, mid-19th century)
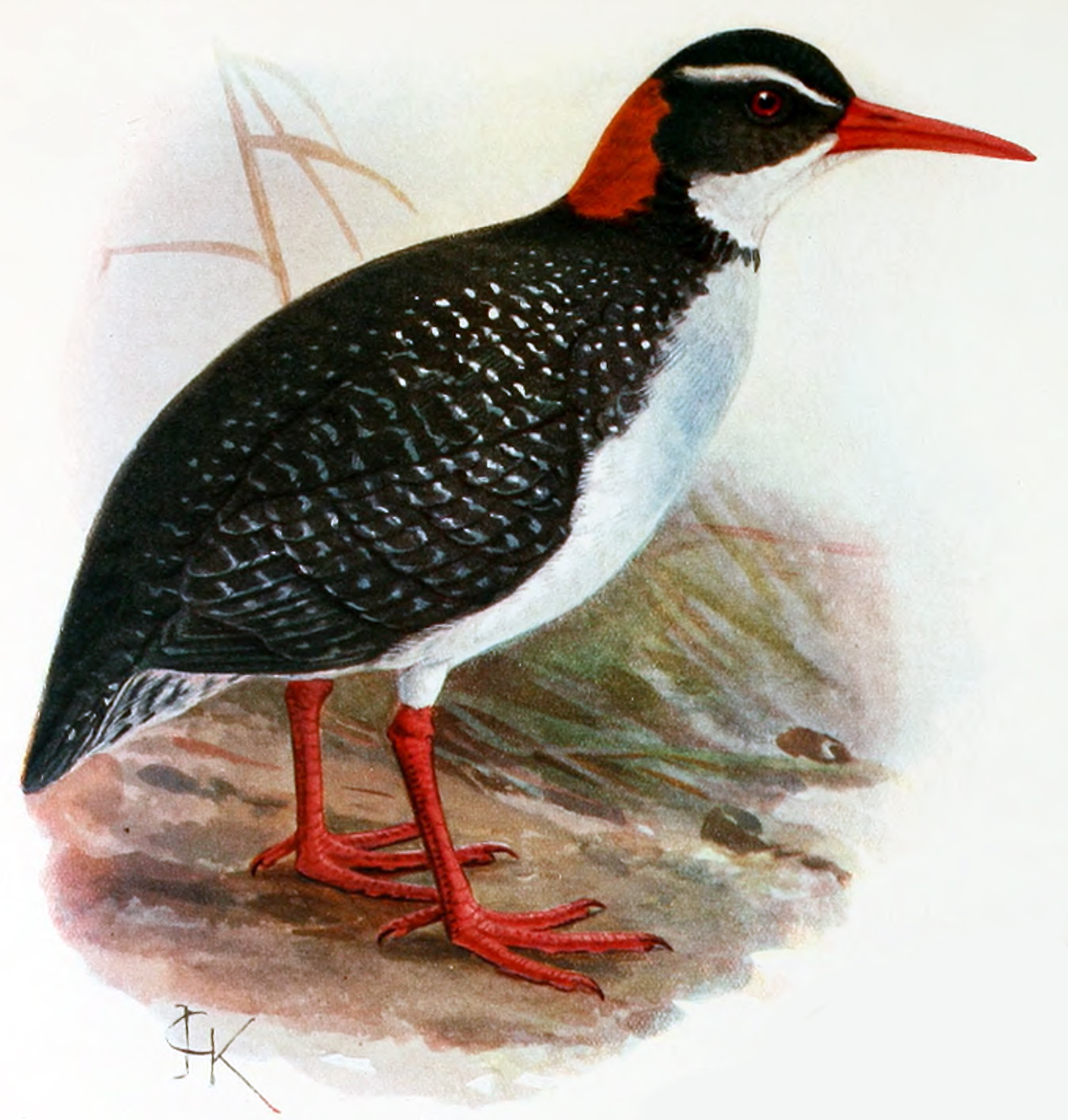
    Tahiti rail
  - Tahiti rail, Gallirallus pacificus (Tahiti, Society Islands, South Pacific, late 18th – 19th century)
  - Wake Island rail, Gallirallus wakensis (Wake Island, Micronesia, 1945)
  - Chatham Islands rail, Gallirallus modestus (Chatham Islands, Southwest Pacific, c. 1900)
  - New Caledonian rail, Gallirallus lafresnayanus (New Caledonia, Melanesia, c. 1900?)
  Officially classified as critically endangered, the last records were in 1984 and it seems as if all of the available habitat has now been overrun by feral pigs and feral dogs, which preyed on this bird.
  - Sharpe's rail, Gallirallus sharpei or Gallirallus philippensis colour morph (unknown extinction date, possibly from Greater Sunda Islands, Indonesia)
  Only known from type specimen of uncertain provenance. Storrs Olson speculated that this bird was a standalone species, Gallirallus sharpei, was likely from Indonesia, given that it was not flightless (implying that it came from a region with natural predators) and its morphological similarities to G. philippensis. It is currently treated as a melanistic colour morph of buff-banded rail following genetic analyses.
  - ʻEua rail, Gallirallus vekamatolu
  Known from prehistoric bones found on ʻEua. It was probably a close relative of the Vava'u rail.
  - Tongatapu rail, Gallirallus hypoleucus (Tongatapu, Tonga, Southwest Pacific, late 18th or 19th century)
  - Hiva Oa rail, Gallirallus sp.
  - Norfolk Island rail, Gallirallus sp. (Norfolk Island, Southwest Pacific, early 17th century?)
  May be the bird shown on a bad watercolor illustration made about 1800.
- Hypotaenidia
  - Vavaʻu rail, Hypotaenidia vavauensis (Vavaʻu, Tonga, Southwest Pacific, early 19th century?)
  This bird was previously known only from a drawing from the 1793 Malaspina expedition, apparently depicting a species of Gallirallus. Subfossil remains belonging to this species were found in 2020.
- Porzana
  - New Zealand giant crake, Porzana hodgenorum (New Zealand, 17th century)
  Sometimes classified in genus Tribonyx.
- Zapornia
  - Saint Helena crake, Zapornia astrictocarpus (St. Helena, South Atlantic, early 16th century)
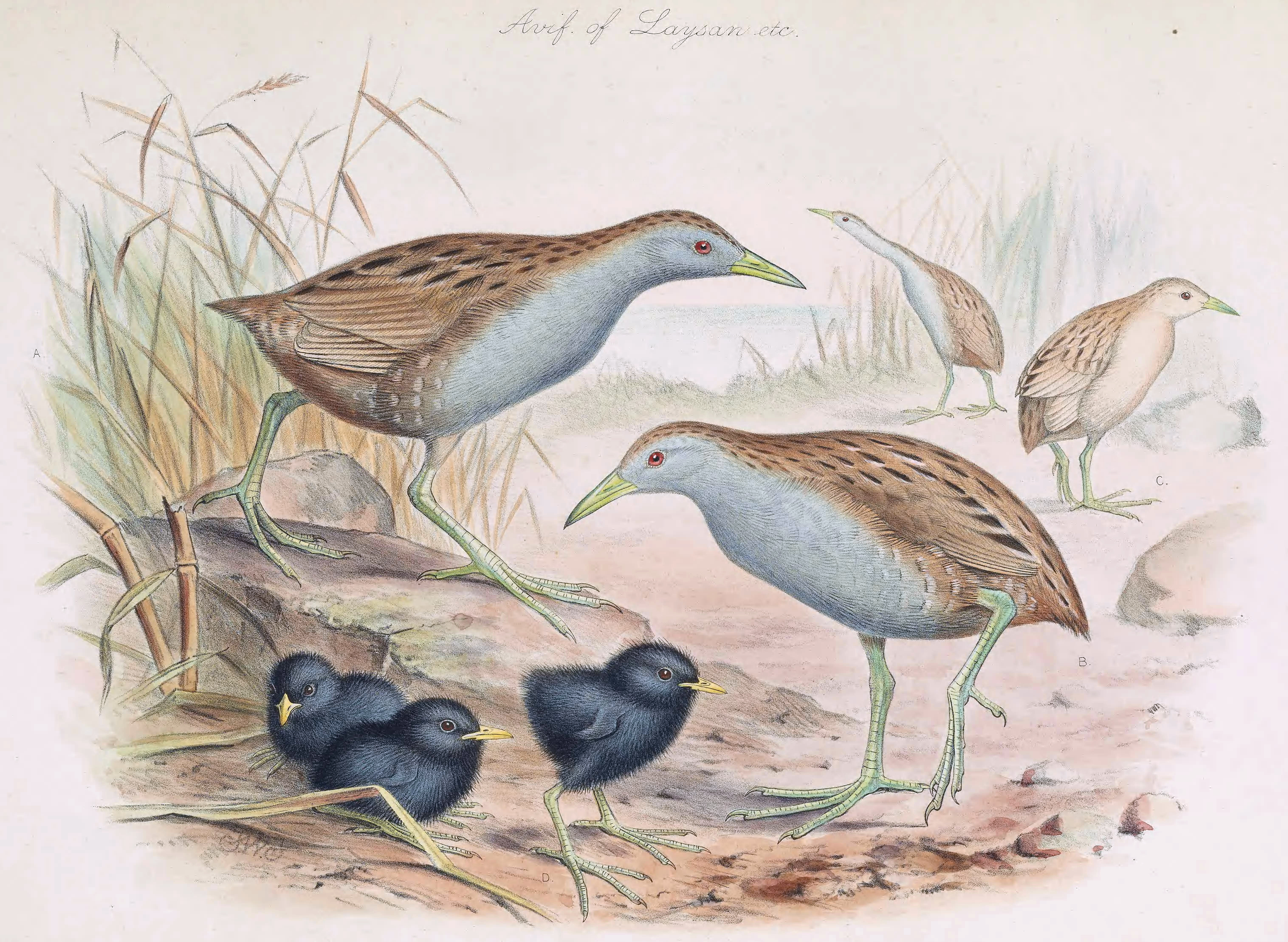
  - Laysan rail
    Laysan rail, Zapornia palmeri (Laysan, Hawaiian Islands, 1944)
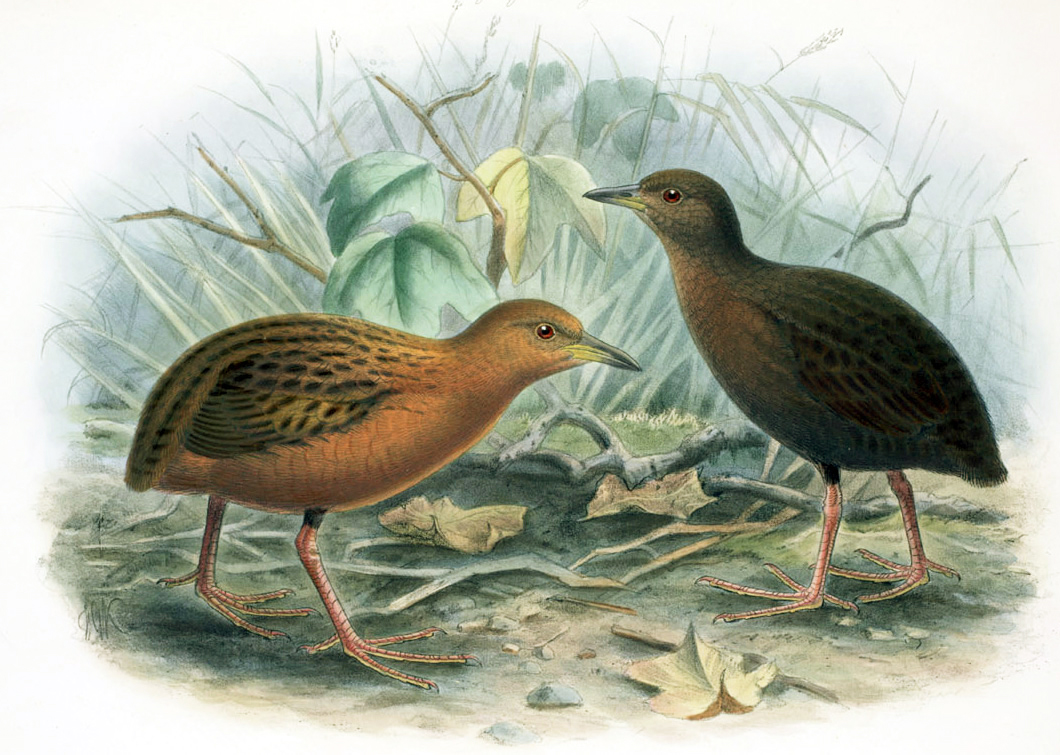
  - Hawaiian rail
    Hawaiian rail, Zapornia sandwichensis (Big Island, Hawaiian Islands, c. 1890)
  - Kosrae crake, Zapornia monasa (Kosrae, Carolines, c. mid-to-late 19th century)
  - Tahiti crake, Zapornia nigra (Tahiti, Society Islands, South Pacific, c. 1800)
  Known only from paintings and descriptions; its taxonomic status is uncertain, as the material is often believed to refer to the extant spotless crake (Zapornia tabuensis).
- Porphyrio
  - White swamphen, Porphyrio albus (Lord Howe Island, Southwest Pacific, early 19th century)
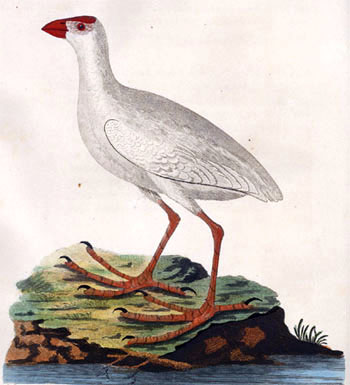
    White swamphen
  - Réunion swamphen or oiseau bleu, Porphyrio coerulescens (Réunion, Mascarenes, 18th century)
  Known only from descriptions. The former existence of a Porphyrio on Réunion is fairly certain, but it has not been proven to date.
  - Marquesas swamphen, Porphyrio paepae (Hiva Oa and Tahuata, Marquesas)
  May have survived to c. 1900. In the lower right hand corner of Paul Gauguin's 1902 painting Le Sorcier d'Hiva Oa ou le Marquisien à la cape rouge, there is a bird which resembles native descriptions of P. paepae.
  - North Island takahē, Porphyrio mantelli (North Island, New Zealand, late 19th century)
  Known from subfossil bones found in New Zealand's North Island; may have survived to 1894 or later.
  - New Caledonian gallinule, Porphyrio kukwiedei (New Caledonia, Melanesia)
  May have survived into historic times. The native name n'dino is thought to refer to this bird.
- Gallinula
  - Samoan woodhen, Gallinula pacifica (Savaiʻi, Samoa, 1907?)
  Probably better placed in the genus Pareudiastes. Unconfirmed reports from the late 20th century suggest it still exists in small numbers and therefore it is officially classified as critically endangered.
  - Makira woodhen, Gallinula silvestris (Makira, Solomon Islands, mid-20th century?)
  Only known from a single specimen, this rail is probably better placed in its own genus, Edithornis. Unconfirmed recent records suggest it still exists and therefore it is officially classified as critically endangered.
  - Tristan moorhen, Gallinula nesiotis (Tristan da Cunha, South Atlantic, late 19th century)
- Fulica
  - Mascarene coot, Fulica newtonii (Mauritius and Réunion, Mascarenes, c. 1700)

Other species

- Bokaak "bustard", gen. et sp. indet. 'Bokaak' (Bokak Atoll, Marshall Islands, c. 1895)

An unidentified terrestrial bird is mentioned in an 1895 report by Georg Immer from Bokaak in the Marshall Islands. It was described as a "bustard" (in German:Trappe) but was most likely a rail or a megapode.

== Podicipediformes ==
Grebes

Tachybaptus

- Alaotra grebe, Tachybaptus rufolavatus (Lake Alaotra and surrounding lakes, Madagascar, 1985)

Officially declared extinct in 2010, 25 years after the last official sighting in 1985. Its extinction was primarily due to habitat destruction, the introduction of invasive and hybridisation with the little grebe (Tachybaptus ruficollis).

Podilymbus

- Atitlán grebe, Podilymbus gigas (Lake Atitlán, Guatemala, 1989)

Extinction driven by habitat destruction, an earthquake-driven drop in lake level in 1976, and hybridization with the Pied-billed grebe (Podilymbus podiceps).

Podiceps

- Colombian grebe, Podiceps andinus (Bogotá area, Colombia, 1977)

Population rapidly declined beginning in the 1950s due to factors including habitat destruction, the introduction of carnivorous trout, hunting, and water pollution. Extensive surveys in the 1980s failed to observe any individuals.

== Charadriiformes ==
Shorebirds, gulls, and auks

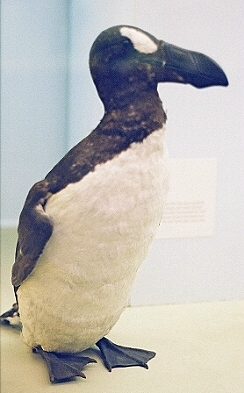
Great auk (Pinguinus impennis), the Natural History Museum, London, England

Turnicidae

- Turnix
  - New Caledonian buttonquail, Turnix novaecaledoniae (New Caledonia, 1911)
  Species remains listed as critically endangered, but the last confirmed sighting occurred in 1911. Attempts to relocate the species in the 20th century have been unsuccessful.

Haematopodidae

- Haematopus – oystercatchers
  - Canary Islands oystercatcher, Haematopus meadewaldoi (eastern Canary Islands, East Atlantic, c. 1940s)
  Last confirmed sighting from 1913, reported extinct in 1940s. Repeated surveys in the 20th century failed to locate any evidence of the species. Extinction likely driven by overharvesting by humans of intertidal zone, habitat destruction, and introduced predators.

Charadriidae – plovers and lapwings

- Vanellus – lapwings
  - Javan lapwing, Vanellus macropterus (Java, Indonesia, mid-20th century) Last recorded in 1940.
  Officially classified as critically endangered due to incomplete survey coverage in suitable habitat and unconfirmed sightings continuing into the early 21st century. Decline and possible extinction driven by hunting and habitat destruction.

Scolopacidae – sandpipers and allies

- Numenius – curlews
  - Eskimo curlew, Numenius borealis (Barbados, 1963)
  May still be extant, no documented sightings since 1963. The species is officially classified as critically endangered, possibly extinct.
  - Slender-billed curlew, Numenius tenuirostris (Morocco, 1995)
  Declared extinct by the IUCN in 2025. A few birds were recorded in 2004 following several decades of increasing rarity. There was also an unconfirmed sighting in Albania in 2007. A survey to find out whether this bird still exists is currently being undertaken by the Royal Society for the Protection of Birds (BirdLife in the UK).
- Prosobonia – Polynesian sandpipers
  - Tahiti sandpiper, Prosobonia leucoptera (Tahiti, Society Islands, South Pacific, 19th century)
  - Moorea sandpiper, Prosobonia ellisi (Moorea, Society Islands, South Pacific, 19th century)
  Doubtfully distinct from P. leucoptera.
  - Christmas sandpiper, Prosobonia cancellata (Kiritimati Island, Kiribati, Central Pacific, 1850s)
- Coenocorypha – Austral snipes
  - North Island snipe, Coenocorypha barrierensis (North Island, New Zealand, 1870s)
  - South Island snipe, Coenocorypha iredalei (South and Stewart Islands, New Zealand, 1964)

Alcidae – auks

- †Pinguinus – great auk
  - Great auk, Pinguinus impennis (Newfoundland, Canada, 1852)

== Sphenisciformes ==
Penguins

- Eudyptes – crested penguins
  - Chatham penguin, Eudyptes warhami (Chatham Islands, pre-1800)
  Only known from subfossil bones, and very likely went extinct prior to European arrival to the islands. A bird kept in captivity between 1867 and 1872 could theoretically refer to this species, but it is much more likely this captive bird was a vagrant member of one of the other Eudyptes species which occur in the Chathams.

== Procellariiformes ==
Petrels, storm petrels, shearwaters and albatrosses

Procellariidae

- Olson's petrel, Bulweria bifax (St. Helena, South Atlantic, circa 1502)
- Saint Helena petrel, Pterodroma rupinarum (St. Helena, South Atlantic, circa 1502)
- Imber's petrel, Pterodroma imberi (Mangere Island, Chatham Islands, 14th – 19th century)

Described from subfossil bones. Unclear when extinction occurred, but the authors describing the species provide a range between the first human arrival to the islands (~ 700 years ago) up to ~ 1872, when Henry Travers documented all the birds occurring on the island and did not describe this petrel.

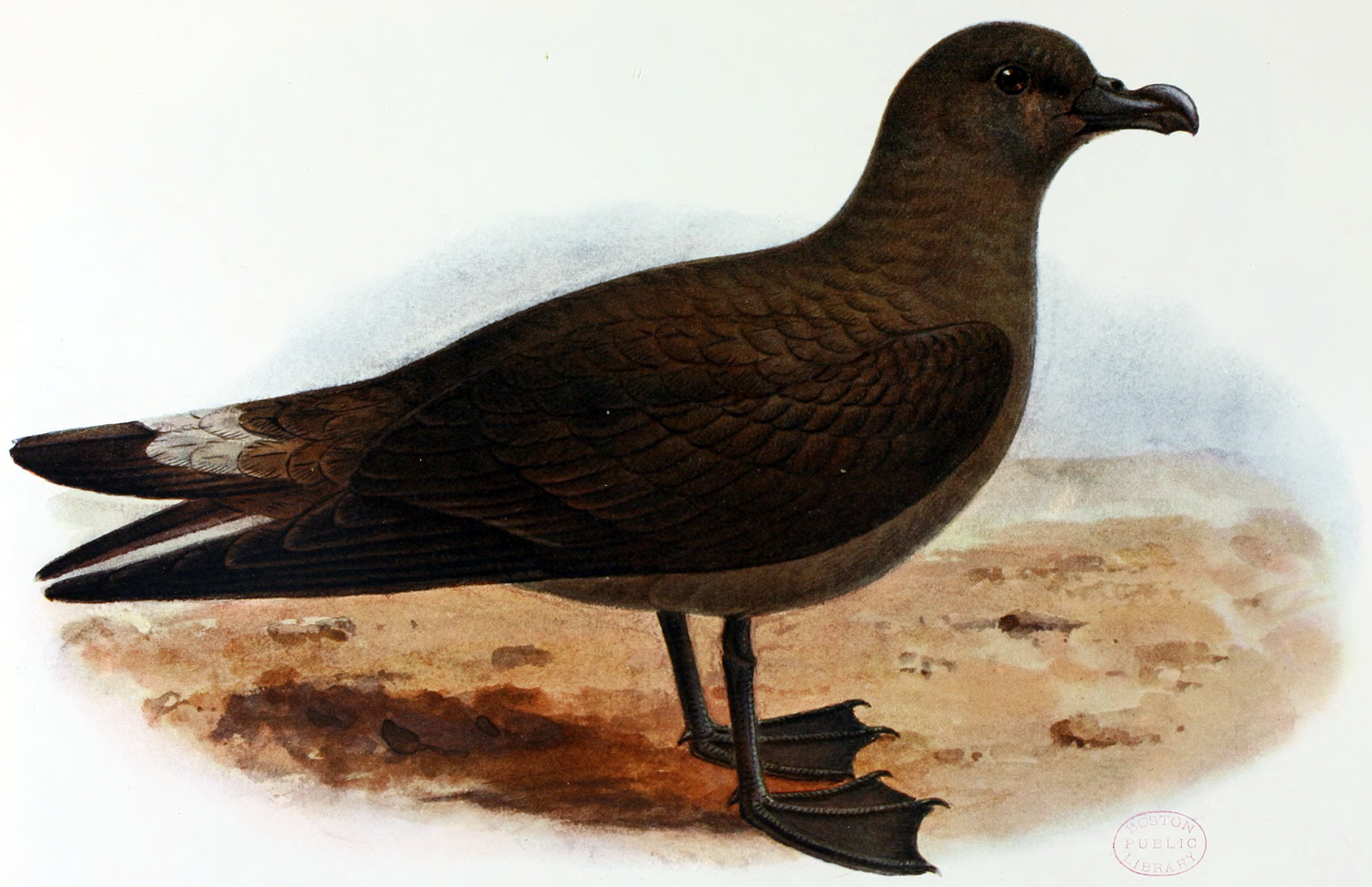
- Jamaican petrel
  Jamaican petrel, Pterodroma caribbaea (Jamaica, West Indies, late 19th century?)

Possibly a subspecies of the black-capped petrel (Pterodroma hasitata); unconfirmed reports suggest it may still exist. Officially classified as critically endangered, possibly extinct.

- Pterodroma cf. leucoptera (Mangareva, Gambier Islands, South Pacific, 20th century?)

A wing of a petrel carcass that was similar in appearance to Gould's petrel (Pterodroma leucoptera) was recovered on Mangareva in 1922, where it possibly bred. No such birds are known to exist there today.

Hydrobatidae

- Guadalupe storm petrel, Hydrobates macrodactylus (Guadalupe Island, Baja California, c.1912)

Officially classified as critically endangered, possibly extinct, though no confirmed sightings have occurred since 1912.

== Suliformes ==
Cormorants and allies

Sulidae – gannets and boobies

- Mascarene booby, Papasula sp. (Mauritius and Rodrigues, Mascarenes, mid-19th century)

An undescribed booby species that was formerly considered a population of Abbott's booby (Papasula abbotti). Known physically only from subfossil bones, but is likely the bird referred to as a boeuf by early settlers; the boeuf was last recorded on Rodrigues in 1832 and likely went extinct following the deforestation of the island.

Phalacrocoracidae – cormorants and shags

- Spectacled cormorant, Urile perspicillatus (Commander Islands, North Pacific, c. 1840)

Last records of this species are from 1840s, though it may have persisted into the 1850s.

== Pelecaniformes ==
Pelicans and allies

Threskiornithidae – ibises and spoonbills

- Threskiornis
  - Réunion ibis, Threskiornis solitarius (Réunion, Mascarenes, c. 1763)
  This species was likely the basis for the "white dodo" ("Raphus solitarius") reported by Willem Bontekoe in 1619 and "Réunion solitaire" described by later French explorers, a supposed relative of the dodo and the Rodrigues solitaire. No Raphid fossils have been found on Réunion, and later descriptions of the "solitaire" are comparable to the behaviour of an ibis.

Ardeidae – herons

- Botaurus
  - New Zealand bittern, Botaurus novaezelandiae (New Zealand, c. 1895)
  This species has intermittently been treated as a subspecies of the Australian little bittern (Botaurus dubius), but all major taxonomies currently list it as a distinct taxon.
- Nyctanassa
  - Bermuda night heron, Nyctanassa carcinocatactes (Bermuda, c. 1610)
- Nycticorax
  - Réunion night heron, Nycticorax duboisi (Réunion, Mascarenes, late 17th century)
  - Mauritius night heron, Nycticorax mauritianus (Mauritius, Mascarenes, c. 1700)
  - Rodrigues night heron, Nycticorax megacephalus (Rodrigues, Mascarenes, mid-18th century)
  - Ascension night heron, Nycticorax olsoni (Ascension Island, South Atlantic, late 16th century?)
  Known only from subfossil bones, but the description of a flightless Ascension Island bird by André Thévet cannot be identified with anything other than this species.

== Accipitriformes ==
Hawks, eagles, kites, and vultures

Cathartidae – New World vultures

- Sarcoramphus
  - "Painted vulture", Sarcoramphus [Vultur] sacra (Florida, United States, 1774 – 1775)
  A bird supposedly similar in appearance to the king vulture (Sarcoramphus papa). Identified by William Bartram on his travels between 1774 – 1775. Skeptics have posited that this bird was likely a misidentification of the crested caracara (Caracara plancus) or a vagrant king vulture.

Accipitridae – Hawks, eagles, kites, Old World Vultures

- †Bermuteo
  - Bermuda hawk, Bermuteo avivorus (Bermuda, c. 1603)
  Known from fossils. Extirpated by 1623, at the latest.

== Strigiformes ==
Owls

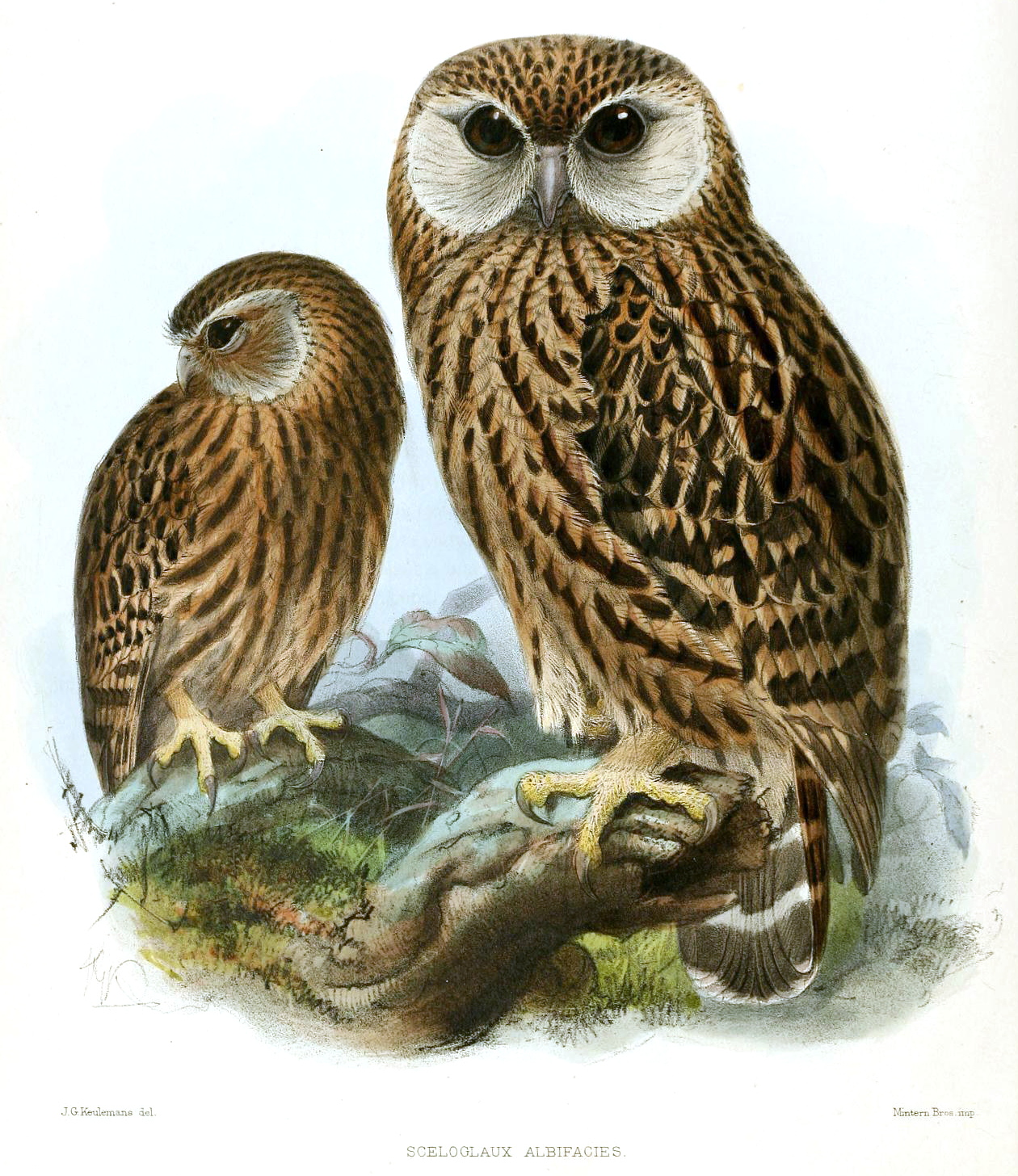
Laughing owl

Tytonidae – barn owls

- Tyto
  - Puerto Rican barn owl, Tyto cavatica (Puerto Rico, West Indies, early 20th century?)
  Known from prehistoric bones found in caves on Puerto Rico; it may have still existed up to 1912, given reports of the presence of cave-roosting owls. Likely a subspecies of, or synonymous with, the still-existing ashy-faced owl (Tyto glaucops).

Strigidae – true owls

- Glaucidium
  - Pernambuco pygmy owl, Glaucidium mooreorum (Pernambuco, Brazil, 2001?)
  Officially classified as critically endangered, but it may still exist. A 2018 BirdLife study citing extinction patterns recommended reclassifying this species as possibly extinct.
- Otus
  - Réunion scops owl, Otus grucheti (Réunion, Mascarenes, late 17th century?)
  - Mauritius scops owl, Otus sauzieri (Mauritius, Mascarenes, c. 1850)
  - Rodrigues scops owl, Otus murivorus (Rodrigues, Mascarenes, mid-18th century)
  - Siau scops owl, Otus siaoensis (Siau Island, Indonesia, 20th century?)
  Only known from the holotype collected in 1866. It may still exist, as there are ongoing rumors of scops owls at Siau.
- Ninox
  - New Caledonian boobook, Ninox cf. novaeseelandiae (New Caledonia, Melanesia)
  Known only from prehistoric bones, but it may still exist.
  - Laughing owl, Ninox albifacies (New Zealand, 1914?)
  Two subspecies: the nominate subspecies N. a. albifacies (South Island and Stewart Island, extinct 1914?) and N. a. rufifacies (North Island, extinct c. 1870s?); circumstantial evidence suggests that small remnants survived until the early or mid-20th century.

== Bucerotiformes ==
Hornbills and hoopoes

Upupidae – hoopoes

- Upupa
  - Saint Helena hoopoe, Upupa antaios (St. Helena, c. 1600s)
  Believed to have persisted into the mid-1600s, driven extinct by introduced predators, destruction of forest habitat.

== Coraciiformes ==
Kingfishers and allies

Coraciidae – kingfishers

- Todiramphus
  - Guam kingfisher, Todiramphus cinnamominus (Guam, 1988)
  This species became extinct in the wild by 1988; between 1984 - 1986, 29 birds were taken for a captive breeding program, which is ongoing. An experimental reintroduced population was released on Palmyra Atoll in 2024.

== Piciformes ==
Woodpeckers and allies

Picidae – woodpeckers

- Colaptes
  - Bermuda flicker, Colaptes oceanicus (Bermuda, West Atlantic, c. 17th century)
  Known only from fossil bones found in Bermuda and dated to the Late Pleistocene and the Holocene; however, a 1623 report written by explorer Captain John Smith may refer to this species.
- Campephilus
  - Imperial woodpecker, Campephilus imperialis (Mexico, late 20th century)
  This 60-centimetre-long woodpecker is officially classified as critically endangered, possibly extinct. Occasional unconfirmed reports come up; the most recent was in late 2005.
  - Ivory-billed woodpecker, Campephilus principalis (southeastern United States and Cuba, late 20th century)
    - The nominate subspecies, the American ivory-billed woodpecker (C. p. principalis), is officially classified as critically endangered and considered possibly extinct by some authorities.
    - The Cuban ivory-billed woodpecker (C. p. bairdii) is generally considered to be extinct, but a few patches of unsurveyed potential habitat remain.

== Falconiformes ==
Falcons and caracaras

Falconidae

- Caracara
  - Guadalupe caracara, Caracara lutosa (Isla Guadalupe, Mexico, 1903)
- Falco
  - Réunion kestrel, Falco duboisi (Réunion, Mascarenes, c. 1672)

== Psittaciformes ==
Parrots

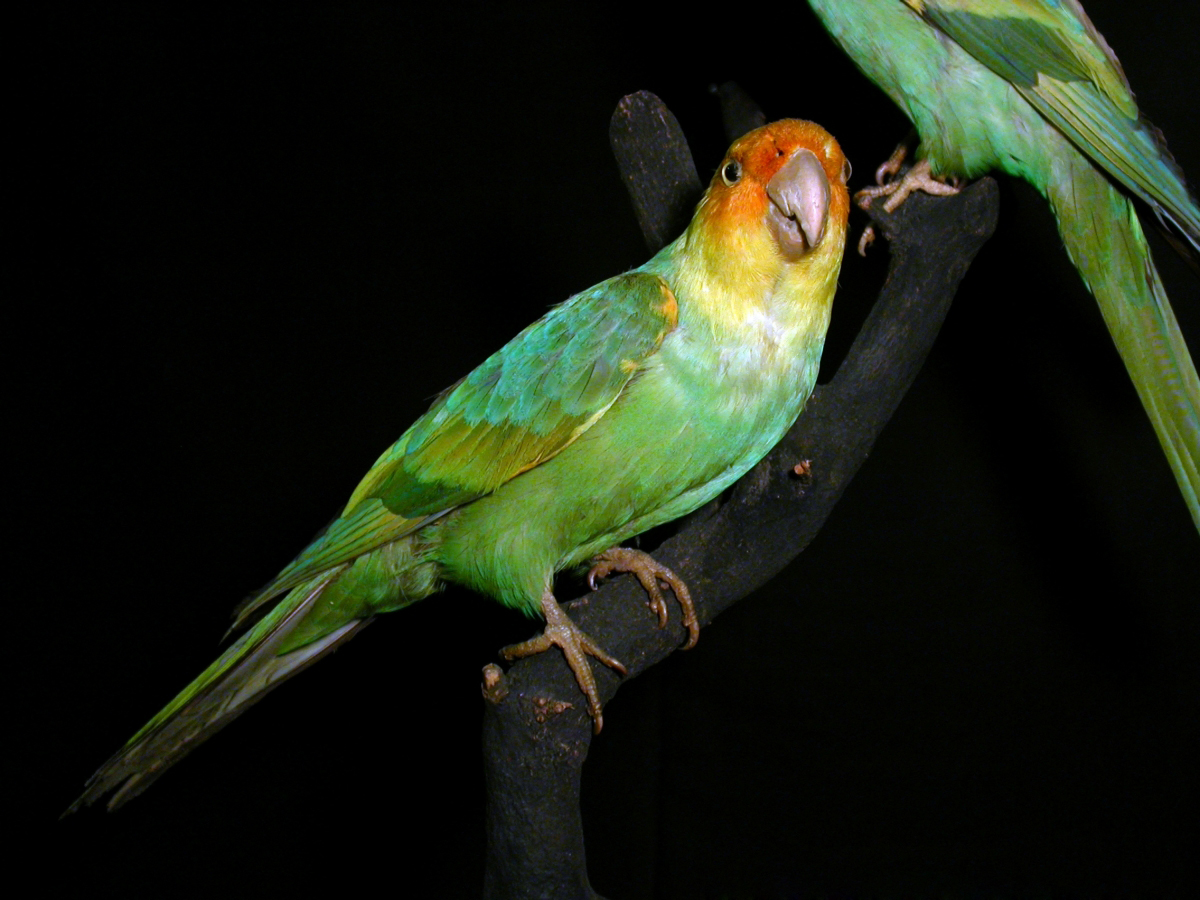
A mounted specimen of a Carolina parakeet, the Museum Wiesbaden, Germany

Strigopidae – New Zealand parrots

- Nestor
  - Chatham kākā, Nestor chathamensis (Chatham Islands, New Zealand, between 1500 and 1650)
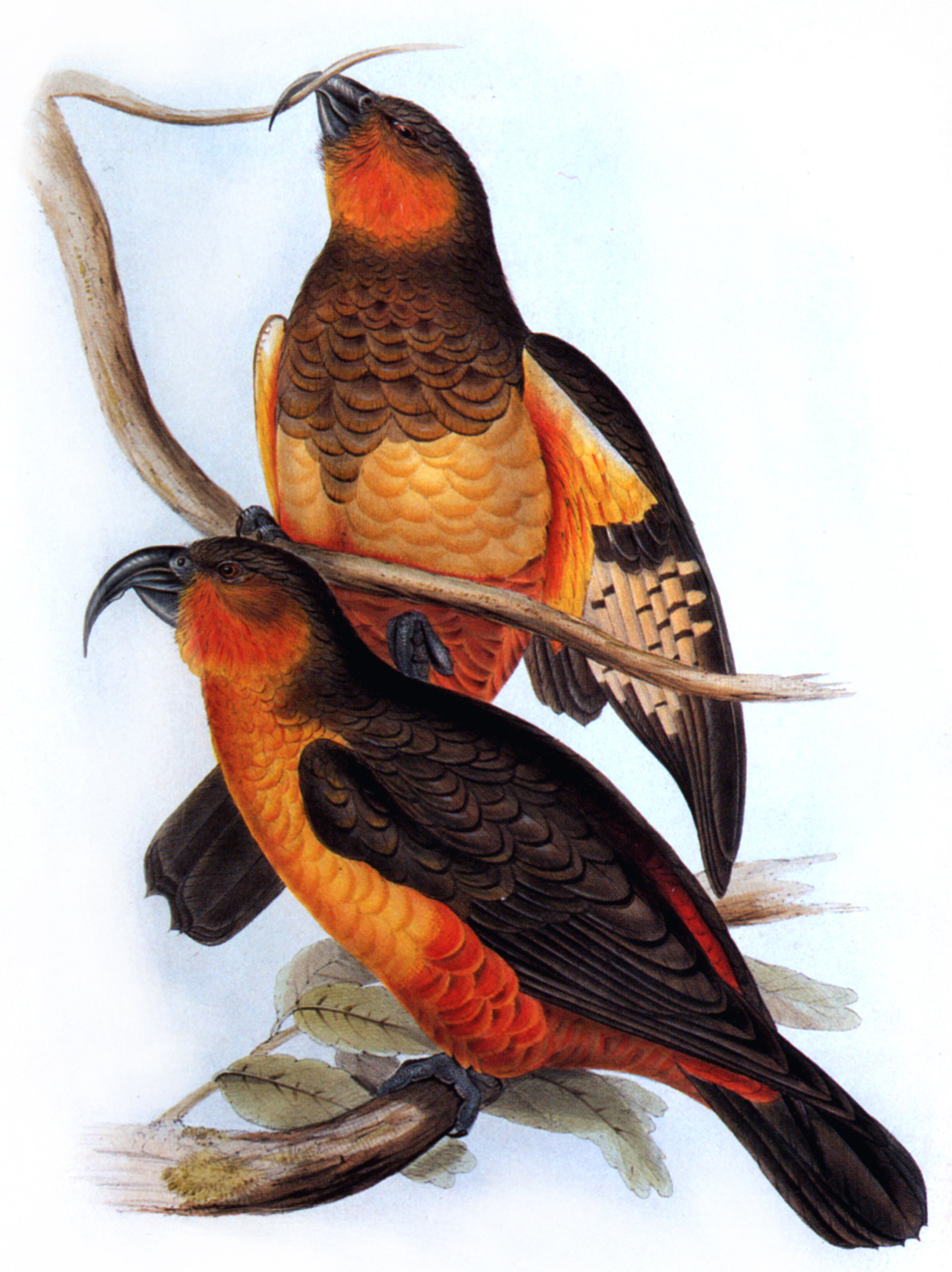
  - Norfolk kākā
    Norfolk kākā, Nestor productus (Norfolk and Philip Islands, Southwest Pacific, 1851?)

Psittacidae – Holotropical parrots

- †Conuropsis
  - Carolina parakeet, Conuropsis carolinensis (southeastern North America, c. 1930?)
  Although the date of the last captive bird's death in the Cincinnati Zoo, 1918, is generally given as this species' date of extinction, there are convincing reports of some wild populations persisting until later. Two subspecies, C. c. carolinensis (Carolina parakeet, east and south of the Appalachian Mountains – extinct either 1918 or c. 1930) and C. c. ludovicianus (Louisiana parakeet, west of the Appalachian Mountains – extinct c. 1912).
- Pyrrhura
  - Sinú parakeet, Pyrrhura subandina (Colombia, mid-20th century?)
  This bird has a very restricted distribution and was last reliably recorded in 1949. It was not found during searches in 2004 and 2006 and seems to be extinct; efforts to find it again continue, but are hampered by the threat of armed conflict.
- Anodorhynchus
  - Glaucous macaw, Anodorhynchus glaucus (northern Argentina, early 20th century)
  Officially classified as critically endangered due to persistent rumors of wild birds, but probably extinct.
- Ara
  - Cuban macaw, Ara tricolor (Cuba, late 19th century)
  A number of related macaw species have been described from the West Indies, but are not based on good evidence. Several prehistoric forms are now known to have existed in the region, however.
- Psittacara
  - Guadeloupe parakeet, Psittacara labati (Guadeloupe, West Indies, late 18th century)
  Only known from descriptions; the former existence of this bird is likely both for biogeographic reasons and because details about it as described cannot be referred to any known species.
  - Puerto Rican parakeet, Psittacara maugei (Mona Island and possibly Puerto Rico, West Indies, 1890s)
  Formerly considered to be a weakly differentiated subspecies of the still-existing Hispaniolan parakeet (Psittacara chloropterus).
- Amazona
  - Martinique amazon, Amazona martinica (Martinique, West Indies, mid-18th century)
  - Guadeloupe amazon, Amazona violacea (Guadeloupe, West Indies, mid-18th century)

Psittaculidae – Old World parrots

- †Mascarinus
  - Mascarene parrot, Mascarinus mascarinus (Réunion and possibly Mauritius, Mascarenes, 1834?)
  The last known individual was a captive bird which was alive before 1834.
- †Lophopsittacus
  - Broad-billed parrot, Lophopsittacus mauritianus (Mauritius, Mascarenes, 1680?)
  It may have survived into the late 18th century.
- †Necropsittacus
  - Rodrigues parrot, Necropsittacus rodericanus (Rodrigues, Mascarenes, late 18th century)
  The species N. francicus is fictional, N. borbonicus is most likely so.
- Cyanoramphus
  - Society parakeet, Cyanoramphus ulietanus (Raiatea, Society Islands, South Pacific, late 18th century)
  - Black-fronted parakeet, Cyanoramphus zealandicus (Tahiti, Society Islands, South Pacific, c. 1850)
  - Lord Howe parakeet, Cyanorhamphus subflavescens (Lord Howe Island, Southwest Pacific, c. 1870)
  - Macquarie parakeet, Cyanorhamphus erythrotis (Macquarie Islands, Southwest Pacific, 1890s)
  Last recorded in 1890 and not found by surveys in 1894.
- Psephotellus
  - Paradise parrot, Psephotellus pulcherrimus (Rockhampton area, Australia, late 1920s)
- Eclectus
  - Oceanic eclectus, Eclectus infectus (Tonga, c. 1793)
  known from subfossil bones found on Tonga, Vanuatu, and possibly Fiji, may have survived until the 18th century or even longer: a bird which seems to be a male Eclectus parrot was drawn in a report on the Tongan island of Vavaʻu by the Malaspina expedition. Also, a 19th-century Tongan name ʻāʻā ("parrot") for "a beautiful bird found only at ʻEua" is attested (see here under "kākā"). This seems to refer to either E. infectus, which in Tonga is only known from Vavaʻu and ʻEua, or the extirpated population of the collared lory (Vini solitaria), which also occurred there. It is possible, but unlikely, that this species survived on ʻEua until the 19th century.
- Vini
  - New Caledonian lorikeet, Vini diadema (New Caledonia, Melanesia, mid-20th century?)
  Officially classified as critically endangered, there have been no reports of this species since the mid-20th century. It is, however, small and inconspicuous and is likely to have been overlooked.
- Psittacula
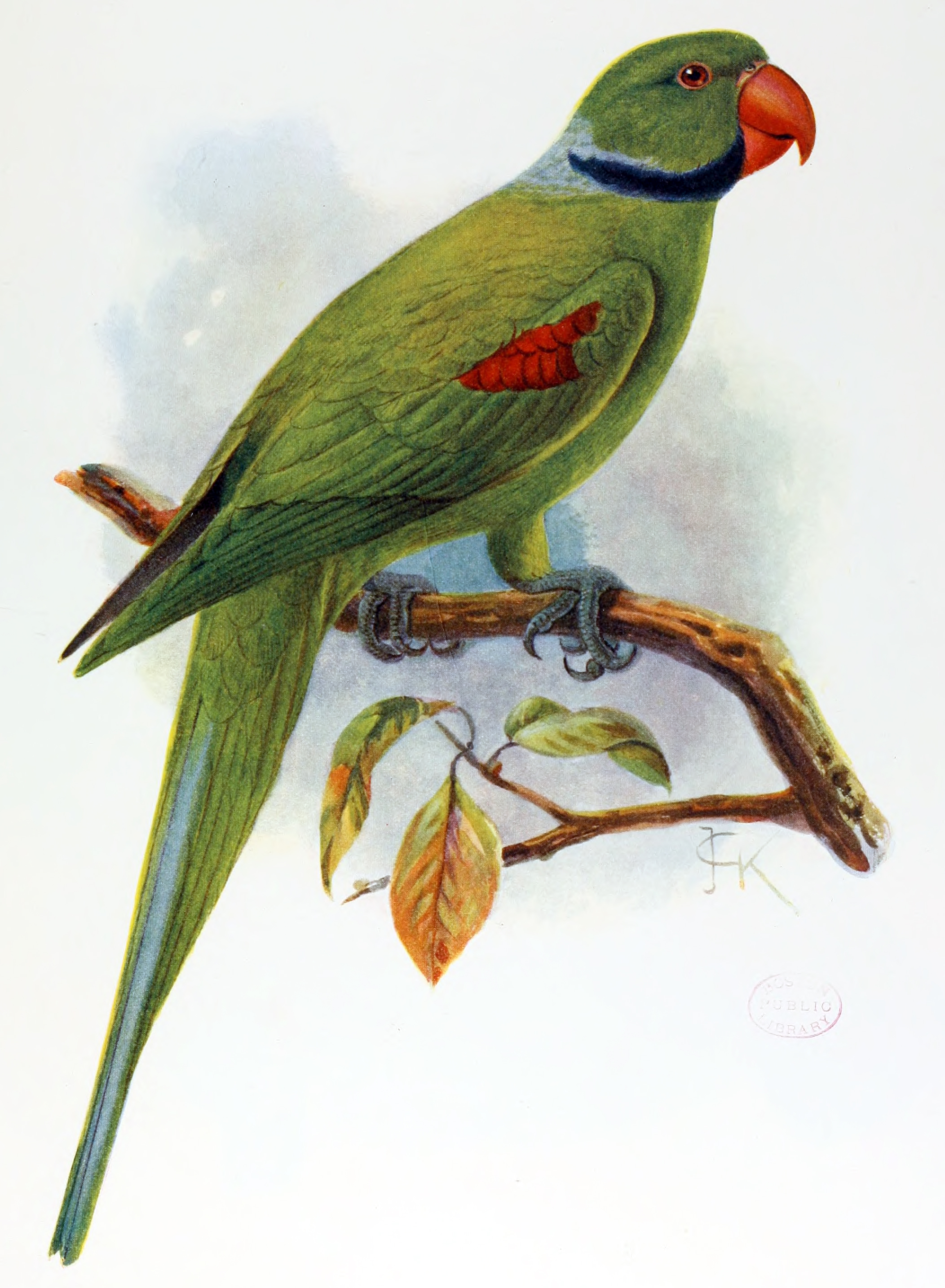
  - Seychelles parakeet
    Seychelles parakeet, Psittacula wardi (Seychelles, West Indian Ocean, 1883)
  - Newton's parakeet, Psittacula exsul (Rodrigues, Mascarenes, c. 1875)
  - Mascarene grey parakeet, Psittacula bensoni (Mauritius, possibly Réunion as Psittacula cf. bensoni, 1760s).
  Formerly known as the Mauritius grey parrot (Lophopsittacus bensoni). Known from a 1602 sketch by Captain Willem van Westzanen and by subfossil bones described by David Thomas Holyoak in 1973. It may have survived into the mid-18th century.

== Passeriformes ==
Passerines

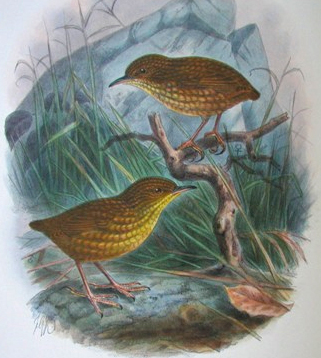
Lyall's wren, a victim of feral cats

Acanthisittidae – New Zealand "wrens"

- Lyall's wren, Traversia lyalli (New Zealand, 1895?)

A flightless species that was famously (but erroneously) claimed to have become extinct due to predation by a single lighthouse keeper's cat named "Tibbles".

- Bushwren, Xenicus longipes (New Zealand, 1972)

Three subspecies, X. l. stokesi (North Island, extinct 1955); the nominate subspecies X. l. longipes (South Island, extinct 1968) and X. l. variabilis (Stewart Island, extinct 1972).

Furnariidae – ovenbirds

- Cryptic treehunter, Cichlocolaptes mazarbarnetti (eastern Brazil, 2007)
- Alagoas foliage-gleaner, Philydor novaesi (eastern Brazil, 2011)

Tyrannidae – tyrant flycatchers

- San Cristóbal flycatcher, Pyrocephalus dubius (San Cristóbal Island, Galápagos Islands, late 20th century)

Described as extremely rare by David W. Steadman in the 1980s and not found despite a six-month survey in 1998.

Meliphagidae – honeyeaters and Australian chats

- Chatham Islands bellbird, Anthornis melanocephala (Chatham Islands, c. 1906)

Last recorded in 1906. Was previously regarded as a subspecies of the New Zealand bellbird (Anthornis melanera), but is now uniformly treated as distinct.

- The identity of "Strigiceps leucopogon" (an invalid name) described by Lesson in 1840 is unclear. Apart from the holotype supposedly from "New Holland", a second specimen from the "Himalaya" either may have existed or may still exist. Lesson tentatively allied it to the Meliphagidae, and Rothschild felt reminded of the kioea.

Acanthizidae – Australasian warblers

- Lord Howe gerygone, Gerygone insularis (Lord Howe Island, Southwest Pacific, c. 1930)

Callaeidae – New Zealand wattlebirds

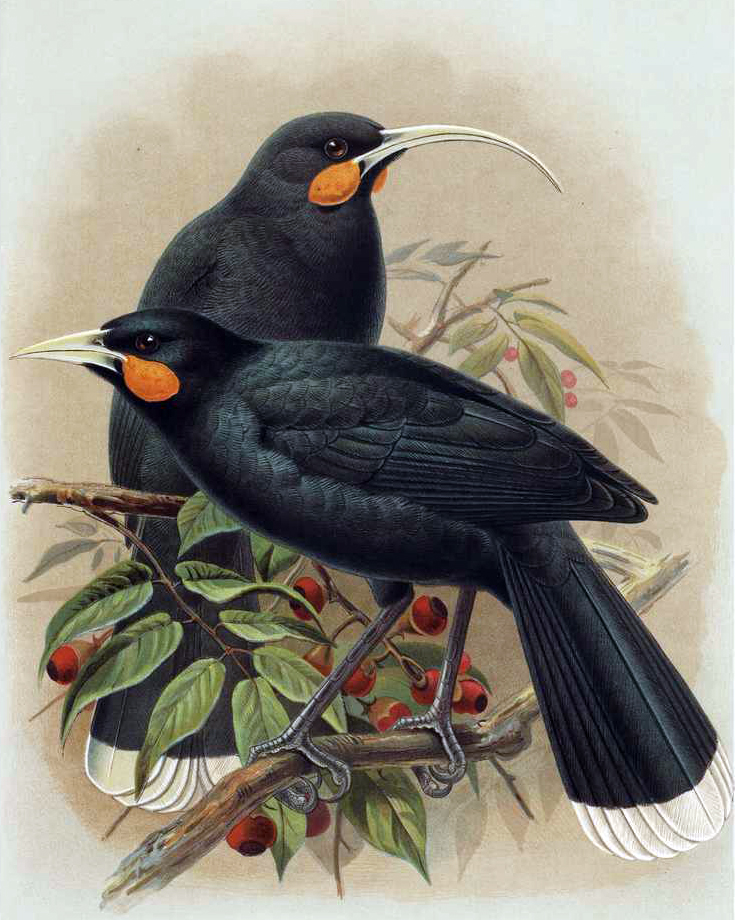
Huia, male (front) and female (back)

- Huia, Heteralocha acutirostris (North Island, New Zealand, early 20th century)
- South Island kōkako, Callaeas cinereus (South Island, New Zealand, 1960s?)

This species is usually considered to be extinct, as it has not been reliably recorded since 1967. However, recent reports from Fiordland suggest that it may still exist.

Pachycephalidae – whistlers, shrike-thrushes, pitohuis and allies

- Mangarevan whistler, ?Pachycephala gambierana (Mangareva, Gambier Islands, South Pacific, late 19th century?)

Tentatively placed here. A mysterious bird of which no specimens exist today. It was initially described as a shrike, then classified as an Eopsalteria "robin" and may actually be an Acrocephalus warbler.

Oriolidae – Old World orioles and allies

- North Island piopio, Turnagra tanagra (North Island, New Zealand, c. 1970?)

Not reliably recorded since about 1900.

- South Island piopio, Turnagra capensis (South Island, New Zealand, 1960s?)

Two subspecies, T. c. minor from Stephens Island (extinct c. 1897) and the nominate subspecies T. c. capensis from the South Island mainland (last specimen taken in 1902, last unconfirmed record in 1963)

Monarchidae – monarch flycatchers

- Maupiti monarch, Pomarea pomarea (Maupiti, Society Islands, South Pacific, mid-19th century)
- Eiao monarch, Pomarea fluxa (Eiao, Marquesas, late 1970s)

Previously considered a subspecies of the Iphis monarch (Pomarea iphis), this is an early offspring of the Marquesan stock.

- Nuku Hiva monarch, Pomarea nukuhivae (Nuku Hiva, Marquesas, mid- to late 20th century)

Previously considered a subspecies of the Marquesas monarch (Pomarea mendozae), this is another early offspring of the Marquesan stock.

- Ua Pou monarch, Pomarea mira (Ua Pou, Marquesas, c. 1986)

Also previously considered a subspecies of the Marquesas monarch, this was a distinct species most closely related to that bird and the Fatuhiva monarch (Pomarea whitneyi).

- Guam flycatcher, Myiagra freycineti (Guam and Marianas, West Pacific, 1983)

Possibly a subspecies of the oceanic flycatcher (Myiagra oceanica).

Corvidae – crows, ravens, jays and magpies

- Hawaiian crow, Corvus hawaiiensis (Big Island, Hawaiian Islands, 2002)

This species is extinct in the wild, but it is being bred in captivity.

†Mohoidae – Hawaiian honeyeaters. Family established in 2008, previously in Meliphagidae.

- Kioea, Chaetoptila angustipluma (Big Island, Hawaiian Islands, 1860s)
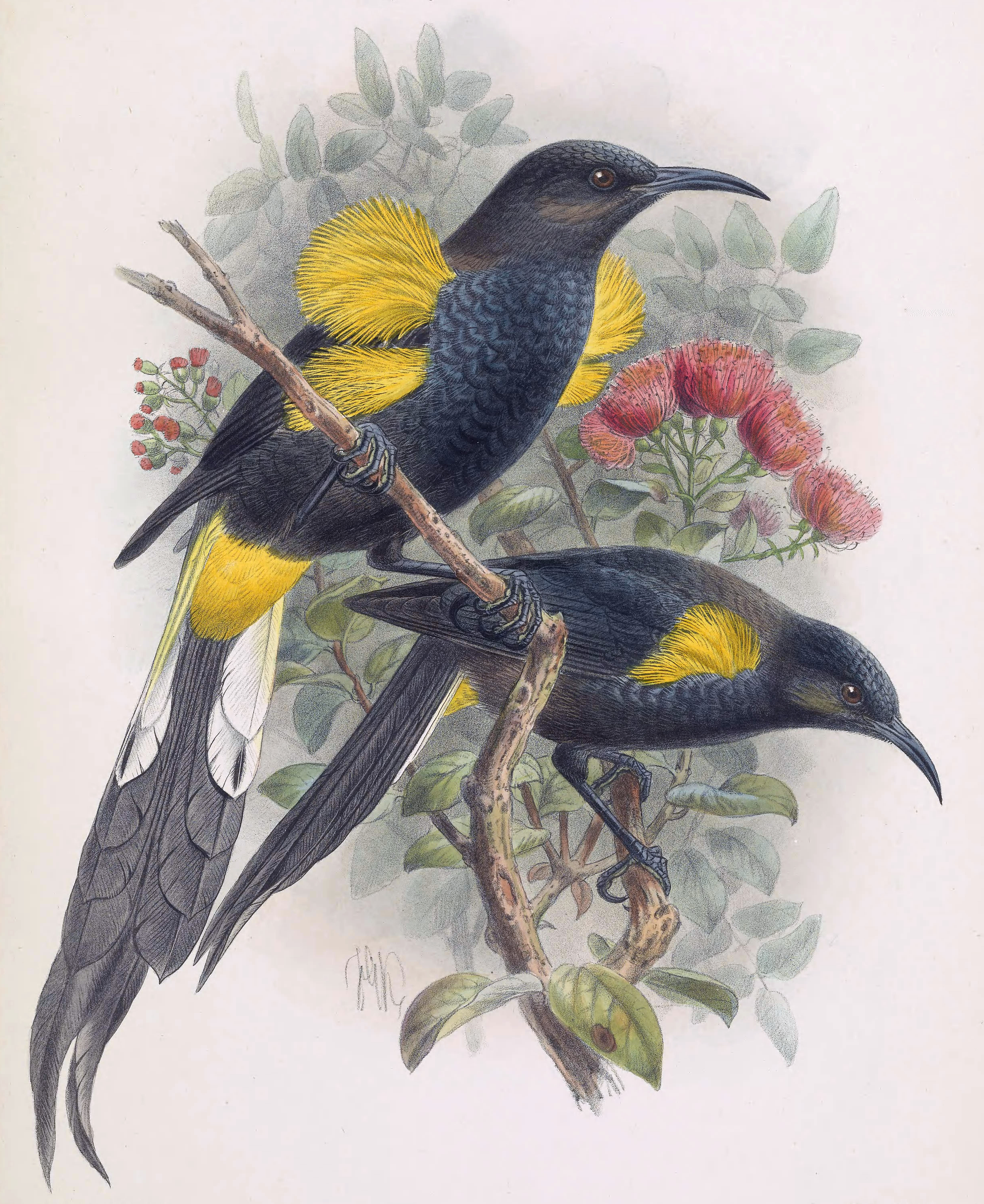
- Hawaiʻi ʻōʻō
  Hawaiʻi ʻōʻō, Moho nobilis (Big Island, Hawaiian Islands, 1930s)
- Oʻahu ʻōʻō, Moho apicalis (Oʻahu, Hawaiian Islands, mid-19th century)
- Bishop's ʻōʻō, Moho bishopi (Molokaʻi and probably Maui, Hawaiian Islands, c. 1910 or 1980s)
- Kauaʻi ʻōʻō, Moho braccatus (Kauaʻi, Hawaiian Islands, 1987)

Pycnonotidae – bulbuls

- Rodrigues bulbul, Hypsipetes cowlesi (Rodrigues, Mascarenes, extinction date unknown, 17th century or 18th century might be possible)

Known only from subfossil bones.

Hirundinidae – swallows and martins

- White-eyed river martin, Pseudochelidon sirintarae (Thailand, late 1980s?)

Officially classified as critically endangered, this enigmatic species is only known from migrating birds and it was last seen in 1986 at its former roost site. Recent unconfirmed reports suggest that it may still exist in Cambodia.

- Red Sea cliff swallow, Petrochelidon perdita (Red Sea area, late 20th century?)

Known from a single specimen found in 1984; this enigmatic swallow may still exist, but the lack of recent records is puzzling. It is also alternatively placed in the genus Hirundo.

Acrocephalidae – acrocephalid warblers or marsh warblers, tree warblers and reed warblers

- Nightingale reed warbler, Acrocephalus luscinius (Guam, West Pacific, c. 1970s)
- Pagan reed warbler, Acrocephalus yamashinae (Pagan, Marianas, West Pacific, 1970s)

Previously considered a subspecies of the nightingale reed warbler.

- Aguiguan reed warbler, Acrocephalus nijoi (Aguiguan, Marianas, West Pacific, c. 1997)

Also previously considered a subspecies of the nightingale reed warbler.

- Mangareva reed warbler, Acrocephalus astrolabii (Marianas?, West Pacific, mid-19th century?)

Known only from two specimens found on Mangareva Island.

- Garrett's reed warbler, Acrocephalus musae (Raiatea and Huahine, Society Islands, South Pacific, 19th century?)

Two subspecies, A. m. garretti from Huahine and A. m. musae from Raiatea. Previously considered a subspecies of the Tahiti reed warbler (Acrocephalus caffer).

- Moorea reed warbler, Acrocephalus longirostris (Moorea, Society Islands, South Pacific, 1980s?)

The last reliable sighting of this bird was in 1981. A survey in 1986 / 1987 was unsuccessful in finding it. A photograph of a warbler from Moorea in 1998 or 1999 taken by Philippe Bacchet remains uncertain, as do reports from 2003 and 2010. Also previously considered a subspecies of the Tahiti reed warbler.

- Aldabra brush warbler, Nesillas aldabrana (Aldabra, Indian Ocean, c. 1984)

Locustellidae – grassbirds and allies

- Chatham fernbird, Poodytes rufescens (Chatham Islands, Southwest Pacific, c. 1900)

Often placed in the genus Megalurus, but this is based on an incomplete review of the evidence.

Cisticolidae – cisticolas and allies

- Tana River cisticola, Cisticola restrictus (Kenya, Africa, 1970s?)

A mysterious species found in the Tana River Basin in small numbers at various dates but not seen since 1972. It is probably invalid; if so, it may be based on aberrant or hybrid specimens. An unconfirmed sighting was apparently reported in 2007 at the Tana River Delta.

Zosteropidae – white-eyes

- White-chested white-eye, Zosterops albogularis (Norfolk Island, Australia, c. 1979)

Population crashed between 1926 – 1962, at which time < 50 individuals remained. Last accepted sightings occurred in 1979, despite intensive efforts since to relocate the species.

- Bridled white-eye, Zosterops conspicillatus (Guam, c. 1983)

This species was last sighted in 1983, and was likely driven to extinction by introduced brown tree snakes.
Note: While the IUCN considers this extinct population a full species under Z. conspicillatus, other taxonomic authorities, such as the IOC, consider it to be the nominate subspecies (Z. c. conspicillatus) of a still-extant bird, also called the bridled white-eye. BirdLife International/IUCN treat this extant population as a separate species, the Saipan white-eye (Z. saypani) and classify it as Near Threatened.

- Marianne white-eye, Zosterops semiflavus (Marianne Island, Seychelles, c. 1900)
- Robust white-eye, Zosterops strenuus (Lord Howe Island, Australia, c. 1918)

Mimidae – mockingbirds and thrashers

- Cozumel thrasher, Toxostoma guttatum (Cozumel, West Indies, early in the first decade of the 21st century?)

It is still unknown whether the tiny population rediscovered in 2004 survived Hurricanes Emily and Wilma in 2005. There have also been unconfirmed records in April 2006 and October and December 2007.

Sturnidae – starlings

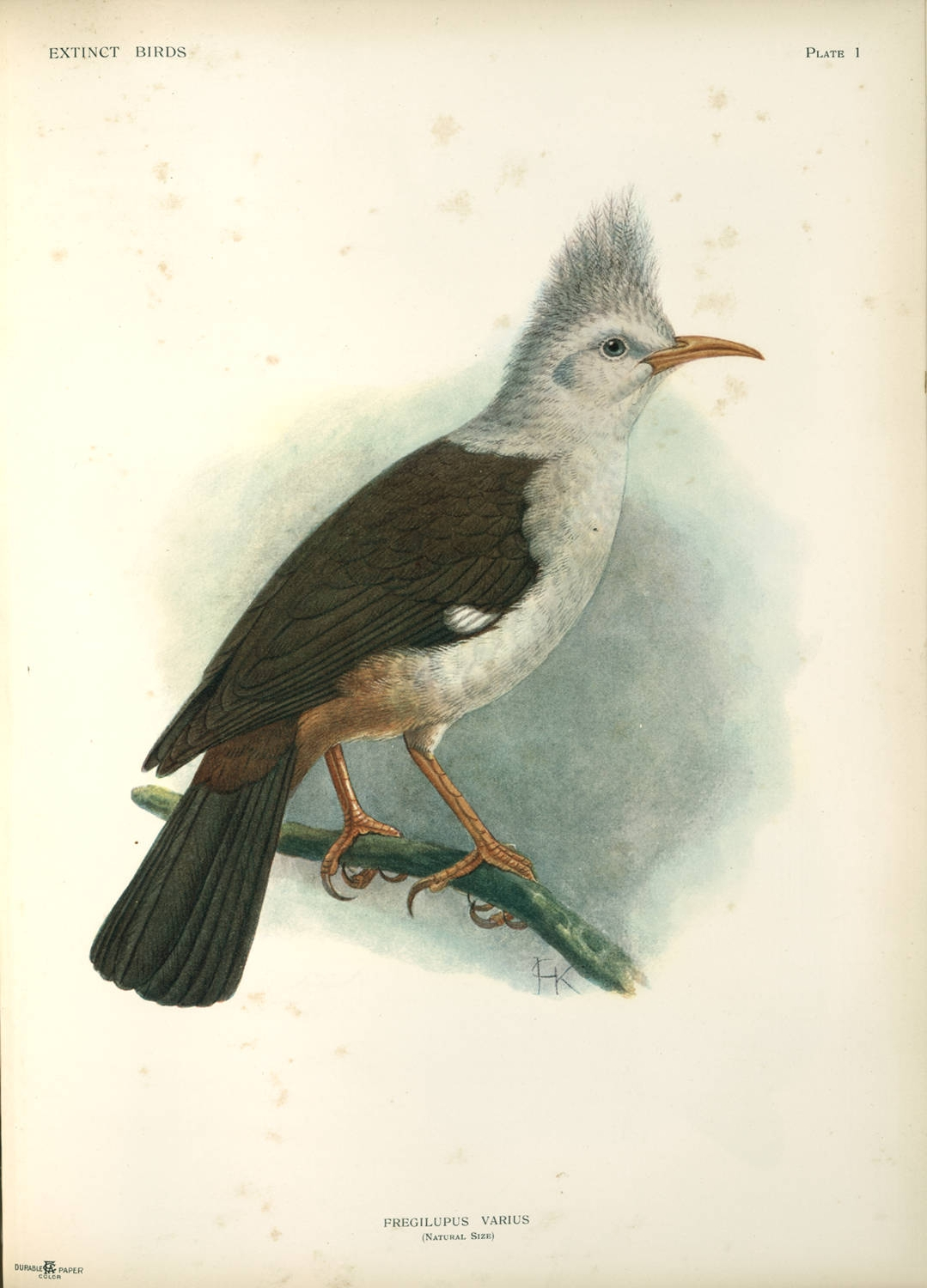
Hoopoe starling

- Kosrae starling, Aplonis corvina (Kosrae, Caroline Islands, West Pacific, mid-19th century)
- Mauke starling, Aplonis mavornata (Mauke, Cook Islands, mid-19th century)
- Tasman starling, Aplonis fusca (Norfolk Island and Lord Howe Island, Southwest Pacific, c. 1923)

Two subspecies, the nominate subspecies A. f. fusca – Norfolk starling (extinct c. 1923) and A. fusca hulliana – Lord Howe starling (extinct c. 1919).

- Pohnpei starling, Aplonis pelzelni (Pohnpei, Micronesia, c. 2000)

Only one reliable record since 1956, in 1995, leaves the species' survival seriously in doubt.

- Raiatea starling, Aplonis? ulietensis (Raiatea, Society Islands, South Pacific, between 1774 and 1850)

Formerly called the bay thrush (Turdus ulietensis); a mysterious bird from Raiatea now only known from a painting and some descriptions of a (now lost) specimen. Its taxonomic position is thus unresolvable at present although, for biogeographic reasons and because of the surviving description, it has been suggested to have been a honeyeater. However, with the discovery of fossils of the prehistorically extinct Huahine starling (Aplonis diluvialis) on neighboring Huahine, it seems likely that this bird also belonged to this genus.

- Hoopoe starling, Fregilupus varius (Réunion, Mascarenes, 1850s)
- Rodrigues starling, Necropsar rodericanus (Rodrigues, Mascarenes, mid-18th century?)

Tentatively assigned to Sturnidae. The bird that was variously described as Necropsar leguati or Orphanopsar leguati and was considered to be identical with N. rodericanus (which itself is known only from subfossil bones) was found to be based on a misidentified albino specimen of the grey trembler (Cinclocerthia gutturalis).

Turdidae – thrushes and allies

- Grand Cayman thrush, Turdus ravidus (Grand Cayman, West Indies, late 1940s)
- Bonin thrush, Zoothera terrestris (Chichi-jima, Ogasawara Islands, c. 1830s)
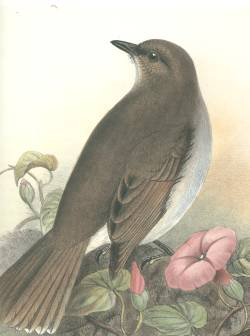
- Kāmaʻo
  Kāmaʻo, Myadestes myadestinus (Kauaʻi, Hawaiian Islands, 1990s)
- Olomaʻo, Myadestes lanaiensis (Hawaiian Islands, 1980s?)

Officially classified as critically endangered because a possible location on Molokaʻi remains unsurveyed. Three subspecies are known from Oahu (M. l. woahensis, extinct 1850s), Lanaʻi (the nominate subspecies M. l. lanaiensis, extinct early 1930s) and Molokaʻi (M. l. rutha, extinct 1980s?) and there may be a possible fourth subspecies from Maui (extinct before the late 19th century).

Muscicapidae – Old World flycatchers and chats

- Rück's blue flycatcher, Cyornis ruckii (Malaysia or Indochina, 20th century?)

An enigmatic species known only from two or four possibly migrant specimens, last recorded in 1918. It may still exist in northeastern Indochina. Possibly a subspecies of the Hainan blue flycatcher (Cyornis hainanus).

Ploceidae – weavers

- Réunion fody, Foudia delloni (Réunion, Mascarenes, c. 1672)

Formerly Foudia bruante; the latter scientific name may actually be a color morph of the red fody (Foudia madagascariensis).

Fringillidae – true finches and Hawaiian honeycreepers

- Bonin grosbeak, Carpodacus ferreorostris (Chichi-jima, Ogasawara Islands, 1830s)
- ʻŌʻū, Psittirostra psittacea (Hawaiian Islands, c. 2000?)
- Kona grosbeak, Chloridops kona (Big Island, Hawaiian Islands, 1894)
- Lanaʻi hookbill, Dysmorodrepanis munroi (Lanaʻi, Hawaiian Islands, 1918)
- Kauaʻi palila, Loxioides kikuichi (Kauaʻi, Hawaiian Islands, early 18th century?)
- Lesser koa finch, Rhodacanthus flaviceps (Big Island, Hawaiian Islands, 1891)
- Greater koa finch, Rhodacanthus palmeri (Big Island, Hawaiian Islands, 1896)
- Greater ʻamakihi, Viradonia sagittirostris (Big Island, Hawaiian Islands, 1901)
- Maui nukupuʻu, Hemignathus affinis (Maui, Hawaiian Islands, 1990s)
- Kauaʻi nukupuʻu, Hemignathus hanapepe (Kauaʻi, Hawaiian Islands, late 1990s)
- Oʻahu nukupuʻu, Hemignathus lucidus (Oʻahu, Hawaiian Islands, late 19th century)
- Hawaiʻi ʻakialoa or lesser ʻakialoa, Akialoa obscurus (Big Island, Hawaiian Islands, 1940)
- Maui Nui ʻakialoa, Akialoa lanaiensis (Lanaʻi and, prehistorically, probably Maui and Molokaʻi, Hawaiian Islands, 1892)
- Oʻahu ʻakialoa, Akialoa ellisiana (Oʻahu, Hawaiian Islands, early 20th century)
- Kauaʻi ʻakialoa, Akialoa stejnegeri (Kauaʻi, Hawaiian Islands, 1969)
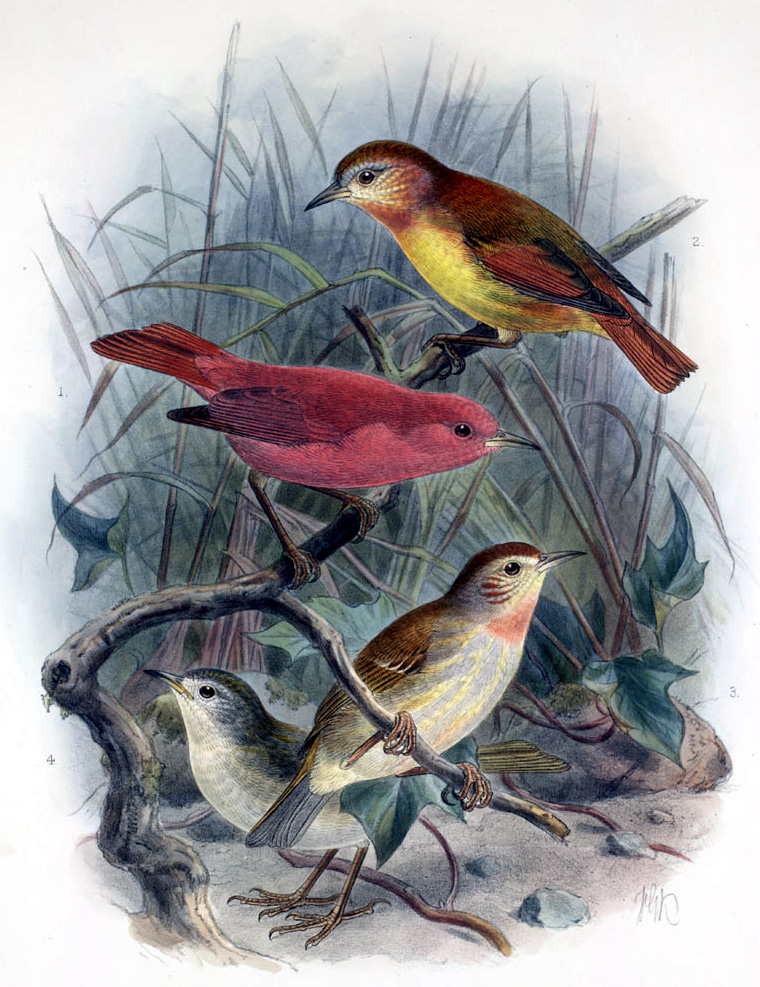
- Kākāwahie
  Kākāwahie, Paroreomyza flammea (Molokaʻi, Hawaiian Islands, 1963)
- Oʻahu ʻalauahio, Paroreomyza maculata (Oʻahu, Hawaiian Islands, early 1990s?)

Officially classified as critically endangered. The last reliable record of this bird was in 1985, with an unconfirmed sighting in 1990.

- Maui ʻakepa, Loxops ochraceus (Maui, Hawaiian Islands, 1988)
- Oʻahu ʻakepa, Loxops wolstenholmei (Oʻahu, Hawaiian Islands, 1900s)
- ʻUla-ʻai-hawane, Ciridops anna (Big Island, Hawaiian Islands, either 1892 or 1937)
- Black mamo, Drepanis funerea (Molokaʻi, Hawaiian Islands, 1907)
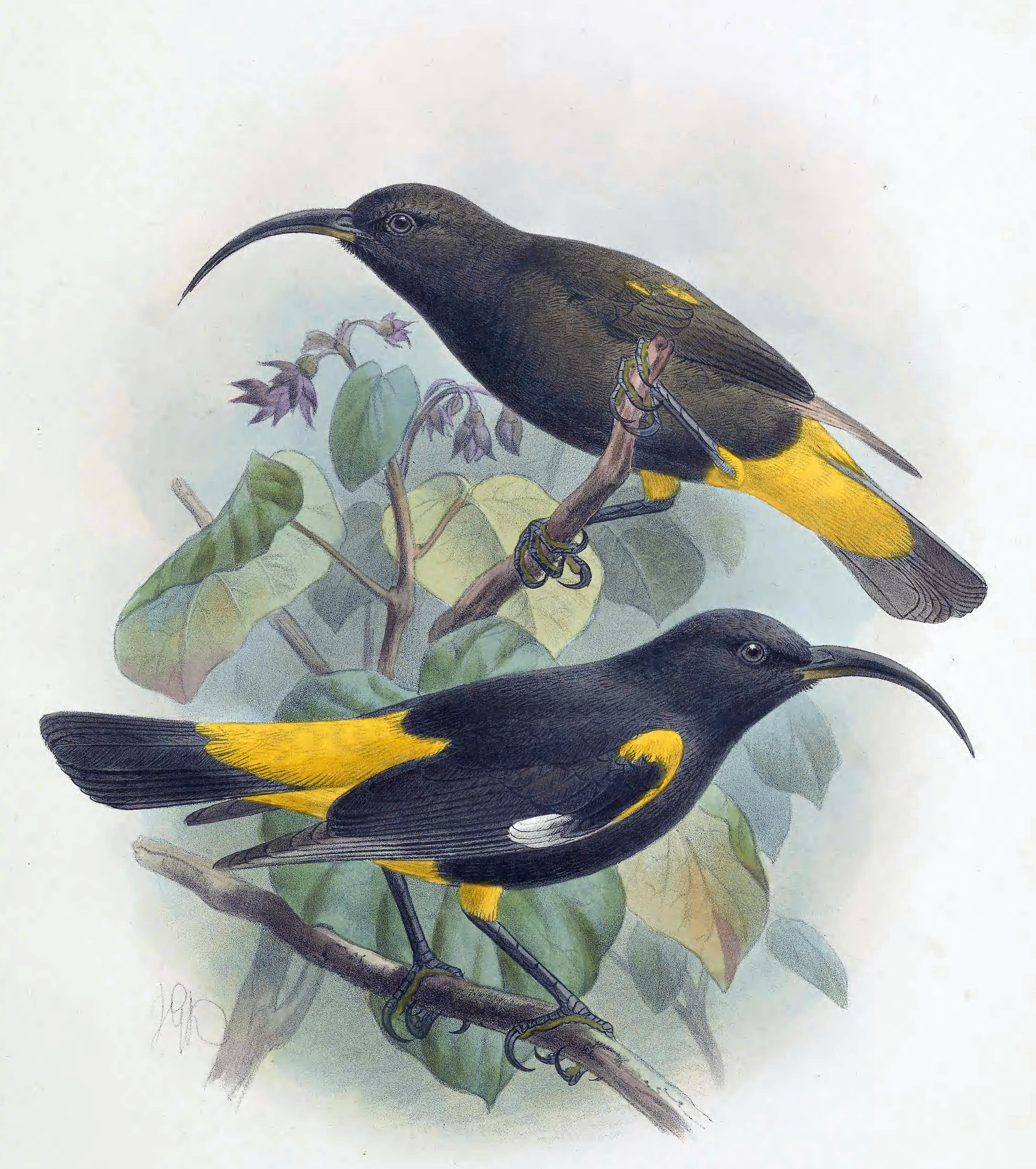
- Hawaii mamo
  Hawaii mamo, Drepanis pacifica (Big Island, Hawaiian Islands, 1898)
- Laysan honeycreeper, Himatione fraithii (Laysan, Hawaiian Islands, 1923)
- Poʻouli, Melamprosops phaeosoma (Maui, Hawaiian Islands, 2004)

Passerellidae – New World sparrows

- Bermuda towhee, Pipilo naufragus (Bermuda, West Atlantic, 17th century?)

Known from subfossil bones and possibly from a travel report by William Strachey in 1610.

Icteridae – New World blackbirds and allies

- Slender-billed grackle, Quiscalus palustris (Mexico, 1910)

Parulidae – New World warblers

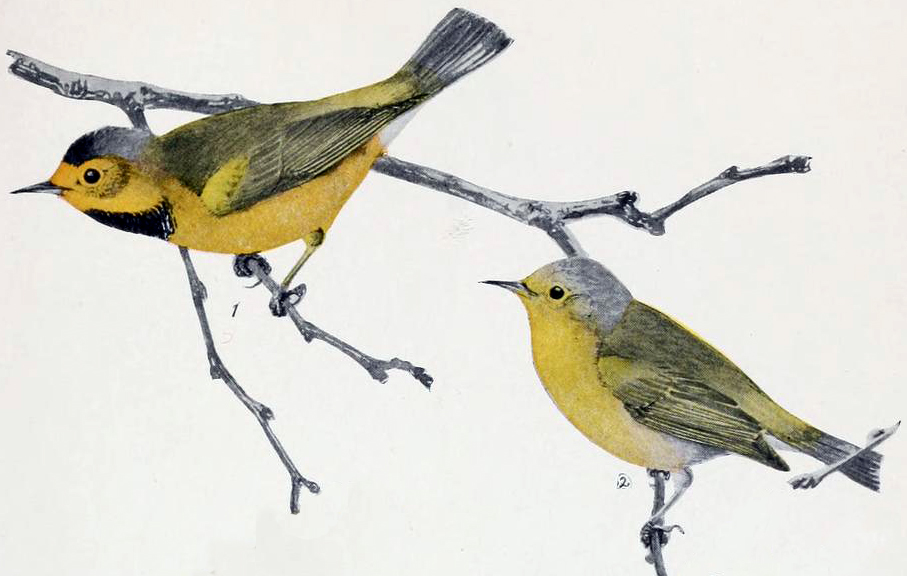
- Bachman's warbler
  Bachman's warbler, Vermivora bachmanii (southern United States, c. 1990?)

Officially classified as critically endangered.

- Semper's warbler, Leucopeza semperi (St. Lucia, West Indies, 1970s?)

Officially classified as critically endangered. Suitable habitat remains and there have been unconfirmed records within the last 10 years.

Cardinalidae – cardinals

- Townsend's dickcissel, Spiza townsendi

Either an extinct species, a variant of the dickcissel (Spiza americana), or a hybrid.

Thraupidae – tanagers and allies

- St. Kitts bullfinch, Melopyrrha grandis (St. Kitts, 1929)

Species is considered critically endangered, and no accepted sightings have occurred since 1929. However, unconfirmed reports, potentially attributable to other species (e.g., Puerto Rican bullfinch) have persisted into the 21st century.

== Possibly extinct bird subspecies or status unknown ==
The extinction of subspecies is a subject that is very dependent on guesswork. National and international conservation projects and research publications such as red lists usually focus on species as a whole. Reliable information on the status of vulnerable, endangered or critically endangered subspecies usually has to be assembled piecemeal from published observations, such as regional checklists. Therefore, the following listing contains a high proportion of bird taxa that may still exist, but are listed here due to any one of, or any combination of, these three factors: absence of recent records, a known threat such as habitat destruction, or an observed decline.

=== Struthioniformes ===
Ratites and related birds

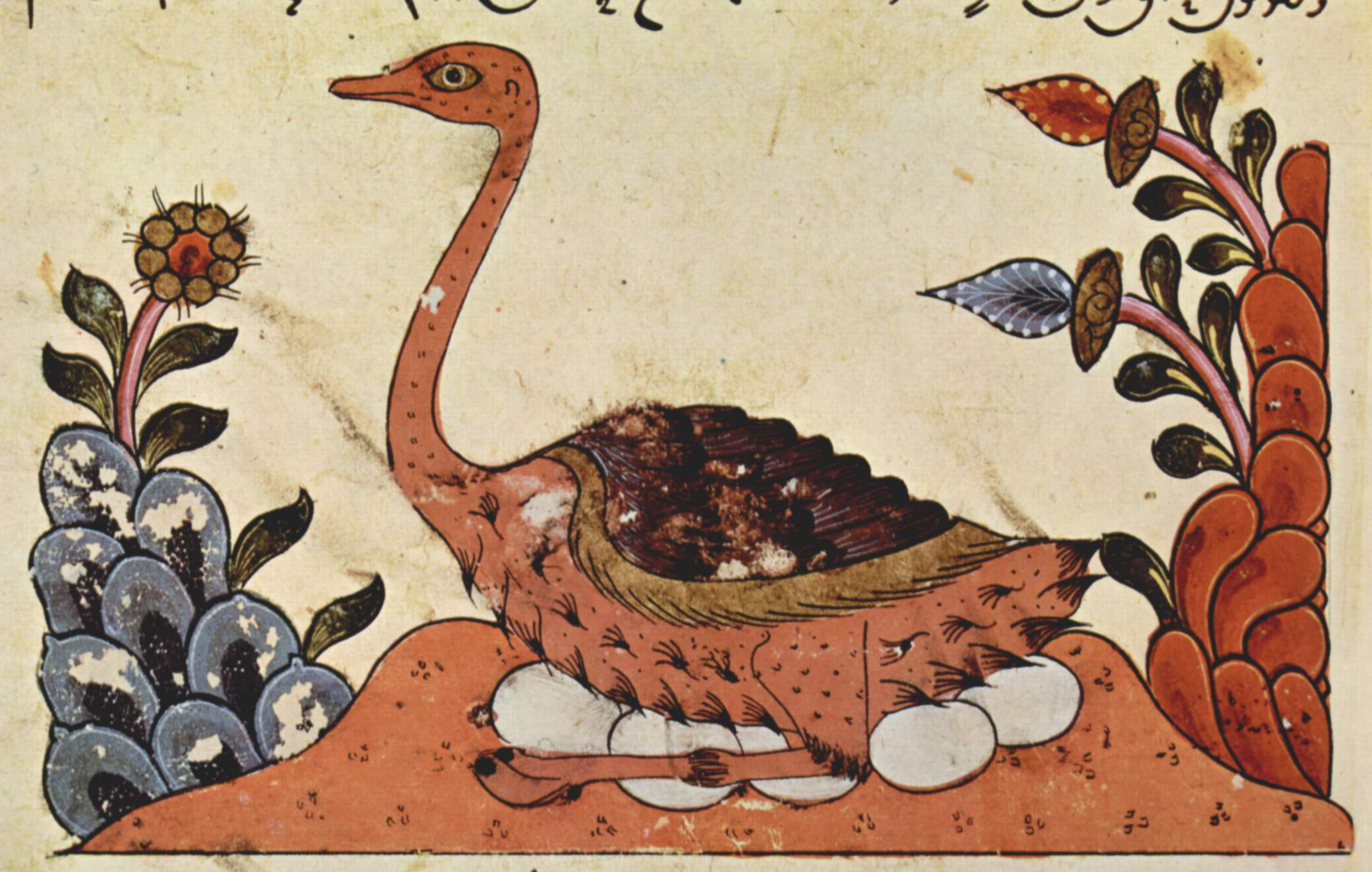
Arabian ostrich

- Struthio – ostriches
  - Arabian ostrich, Struthio camelus syriacus (Arabia, 1966)
  The last record of this subspecies of the common ostrich was a bird found dead in Jordan in 1966.

=== Apterygiformes ===
- North Island little spotted kiwi, Apteryx owenii iredalei (North Island, New Zealand, late 19th century)
  A doubtfully distinct subspecies of the little spotted kiwi.

=== Casuariiformes ===
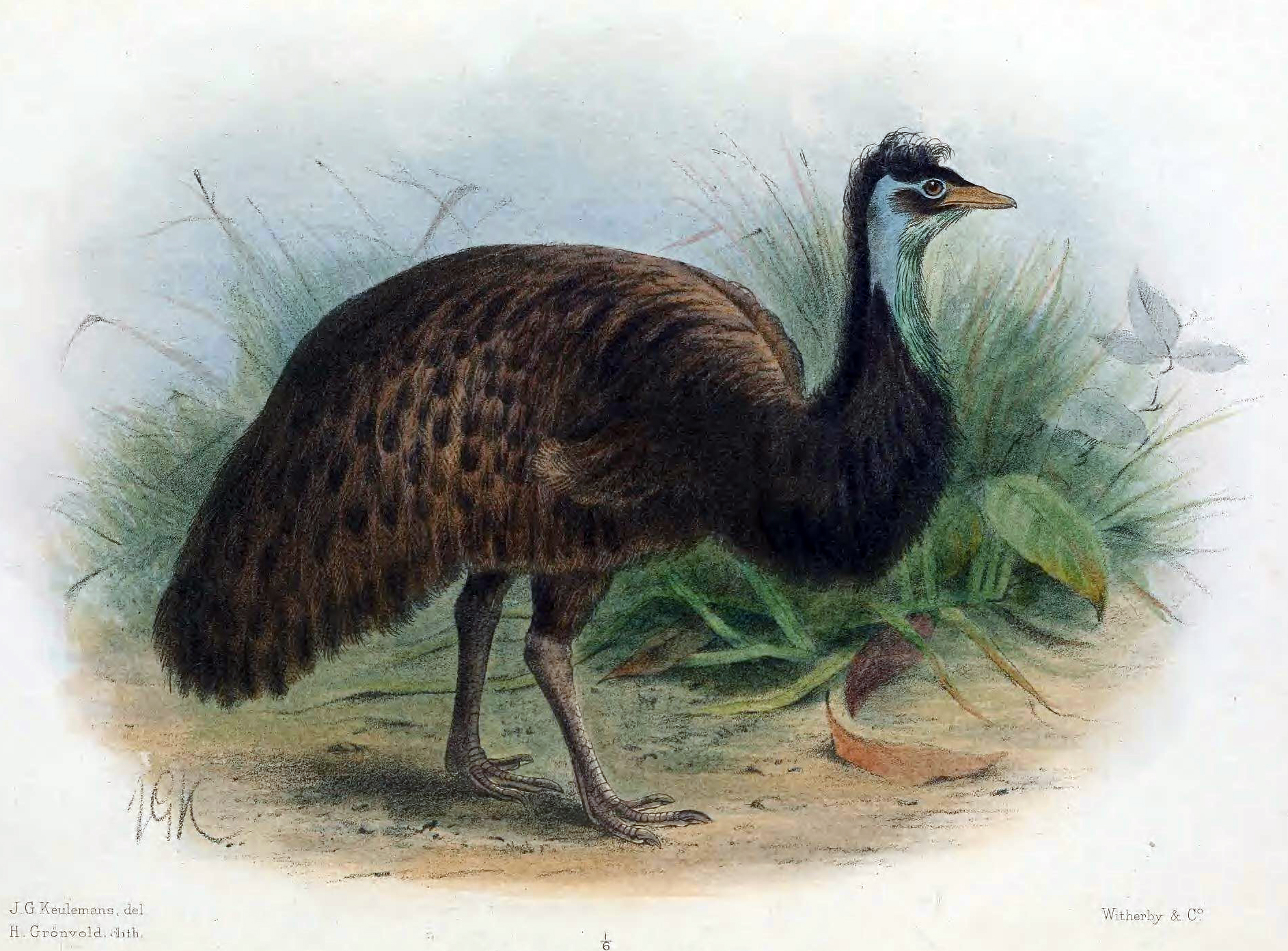
Kangaroo Island emu

- Dromaius – emu
  - King Island emu, Dromaius novaehollandiae minor (King Island, Australia, 1822)
    An island dwarf subspecies of the emu; extinct in the wild c. 1805, the last captive specimen died in 1822 in the Jardin des Plantes.
  - Kangaroo Island emu, Dromaius novaehollandiae baudinianus (Kangaroo Island, Australia, 1827)
    Another island dwarf subspecies of the emu; extinct since c. 1827.
  - Tasmanian emu, Dromaius novaehollandiae diemenensis (Tasmania, Australia, mid-19th century)
    Yet another island dwarf subspecies of the emu; the last wild bird was collected in 1845, but it may have survived in captivity until 1884. It may be invalid.

=== Anseriformes ===
Ducks, geese and swans

- Bering cackling goose, Branta hutchinsii asiatica (Commander and Kuril Islands, N Pacific, c. 1914 or 1929)
  A formerly recognised subspecies of the cackling goose (formerly called the Bering Canada goose (Branta canadensis asiatica)) which was not distinct from the similar-looking and still-existing Aleutian cackling goose (B. h. leucopareia) and is now considered to be invalid.
- Rennell Island teal, Anas gibberifrons remissa (Rennell Island, Solomon Islands, c. 1959)
  A doubtfully distinct subspecies of the Sunda teal which disappeared due to predation on ducklings by introduced Mozambique tilapia (Oreochromis mossambicus).
- Niceforo's yellow-billed pintail, Anas georgica niceforoi (Colombia, 1950s)
  A subspecies of the yellow-billed pintail that has not been recorded since the 1950s.
- Borrero's cinnamon teal, Anas cyanoptera borreroi (Colombia, mid-20th century?)
  A subspecies of the cinnamon teal known only from a restricted area in the Cordillera Occidental of Colombia, with a couple of records from Ecuador. It was discovered in 1946 and thought to have become extinct by 1956.
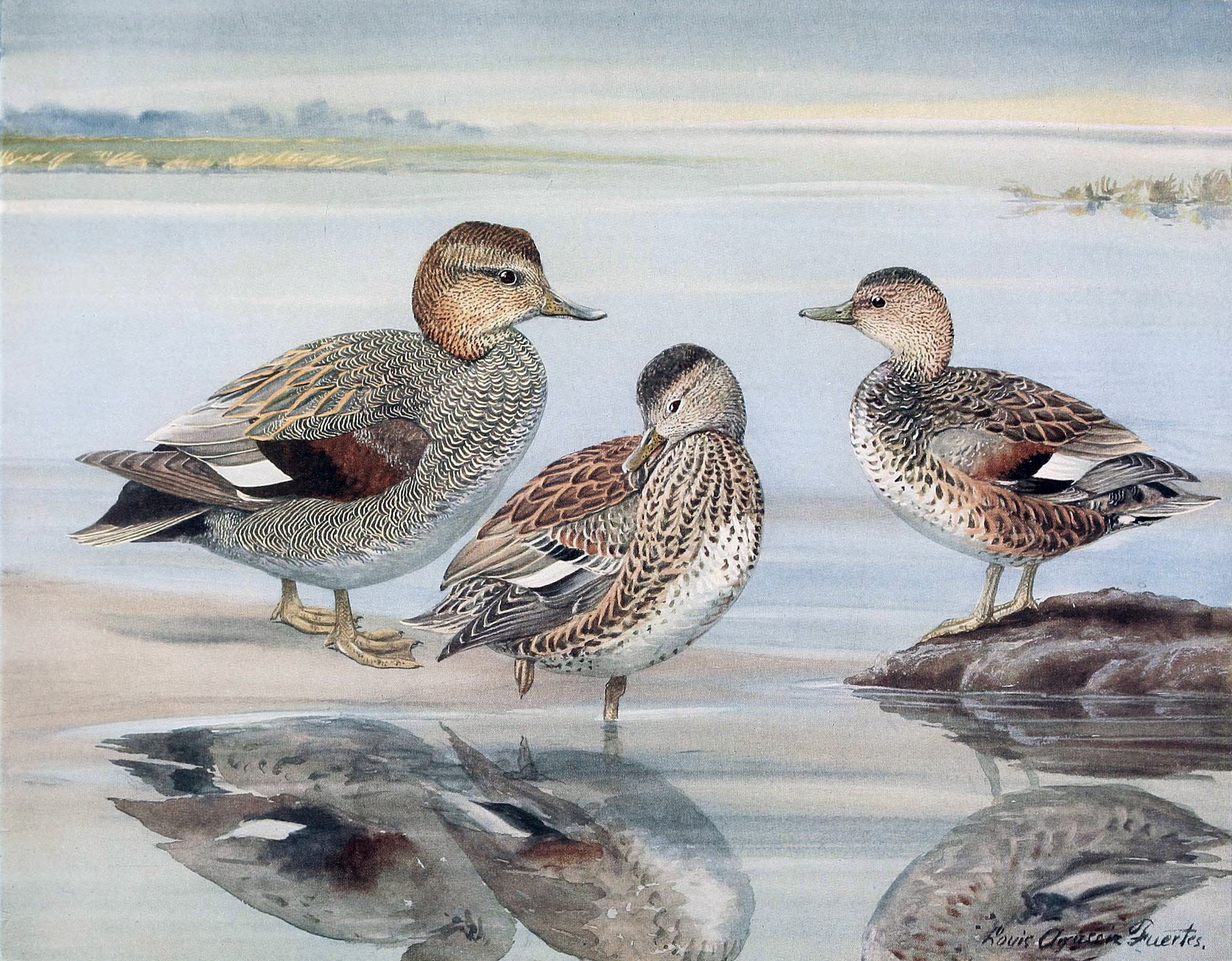
- Coues's gadwall
  Coues's gadwall, Mareca strepera couesi (Teraina, Kiribati, c. 1900)
  This island subspecies of the gadwall was discovered and named in 1874 after two birds were shot and has not been recorded since, with none found by a 1924 expedition from Honolulu's Bishop Museum.

=== Galliformes ===
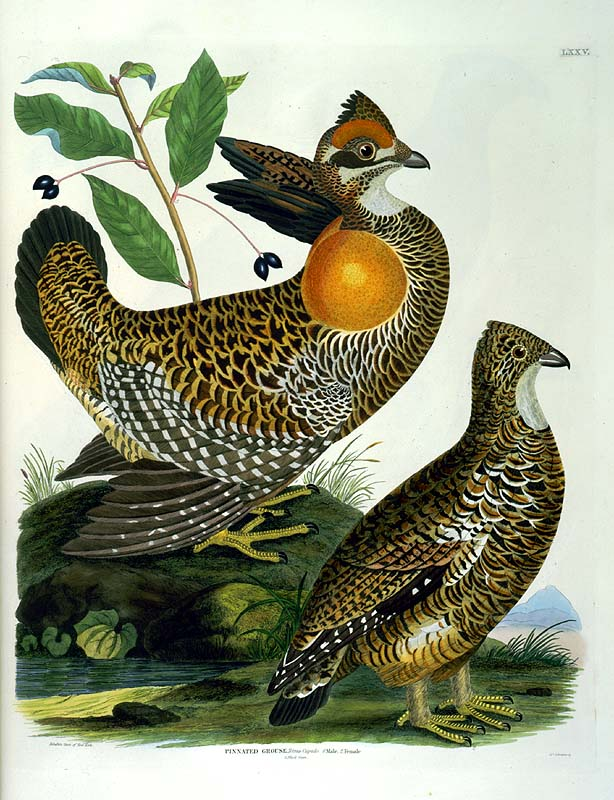
Heath Hen

Quails and relatives

- Lake Amik black francolin, Francolinus francolinus billypayni (southern Turkey, possibly Lebanon, 1960s)
  A doubtfully distinct subspecies of the black francolin.
- Sicilian black francolin, Francolinus francolinus ssp. (Sicily, Mediterranean, c. 1869)
  Another doubtfully distinct subspecies of the black francolin.
- Heath hen, Tympanuchus cupido cupido, (Martha's Vineyard, Massachusetts, 1932)
  Subspecies of the greater prairie-chicken. Driven extinct by overhunting.
- New Mexico sharp-tailed grouse, Tympanuchus phasianellus hueyi (New Mexico, North America, 1950s)
  A subspecies of the sharp-tailed grouse last recorded in Colfax County in 1952.
- Moroccan helmeted guineafowl, Numida meleagris sabyi (Morocco, mid- to late 20th century?)
  A subspecies of the helmeted guineafowl. Reportedly still kept in captivity in Morocco in the late 1990s. Possibly extinct in the wild by 1950; three records from the 1970s may refer to feral-domestic hybrids.

=== Charadriiformes ===
Shorebirds, gulls and auks

Scolopacidae – sandpipers

- Kiritimati sandpiper, Prosobonia cancellata cancellata (Kiritimati, Kirabati, 19th century?)
  The doubtfully distinct nominate subspecies of the Tuamotu sandpiper; sometimes considered a distinct species, but known only from a painting.

Turnicidae – buttonquails

- Tawitawi common buttonquail, Turnix sylvaticus suluensis (Tawitawi, Sulu Archipelago, Philippines, mid-20th century?)
  A subspecies of the common buttonquail; it has not been recorded since the 1950s, but there have been few surveys and it may still exist.

=== Gruiformes ===
Rails and allies – probably paraphyletic

- Goldman's yellow rail, Coturnicops noveboracensis goldmani (Mexico, late 20th century?)
  A subspecies of the yellow rail that has not been recorded since 1964 and has lost much of its wetland habitat since then.
- Macquarie rail, Hypotaenidia philippensis macquariensis (Macquarie Islands, Southwest Pacific, 1880s)
  A subspecies of the buff-banded rail.
- Raoul Island banded rail, Hypotaenidia philippensis ssp. (Raoul, Kermadec Islands, Southwest Pacific, late 19th century?)
  Reports of the former occurrence of the species on Raoul seem to be plausible enough, but they may refer to vagrant individuals of another subspecies of the buff-banded rail.
- Peruvian rail, Rallus semiplumbeus peruvianus (Peru, 20th century?)
  A subspecies of the Bogota rail which is known from a single specimen collected in the 1880s. It may still exist.
- Western Lewin's rail, Lewinia pectoralis clelandi (southwestern Australia, late 1930s?)
  A subspecies of Lewin's rail not recorded since 1932 despite multiple surveys in the late 20th century.
- Assumption white-throated rail, Dryolimnas cuvieri abbotti (Assumption, Astove and Cosmoledo, Aldabra, early 20th century)
  A subspecies of the white-throated rail.
- Jamaican wood rail, Amaurolimnas concolor concolor (Jamaica, West Indies, late 19th century)
  The nominate subspecies of the uniform crake declined rapidly and became extinct following the introduction of the small Indian mongoose (Urva auropunctata) to Jamaica in 1872.
- Intact rail, Gymnocrex plumbeiventris intactus (Melanesia, 20th century?)
  A doubtfully distinct subspecies of the bare-eyed rail known from a single specimen, c. mid-19th century, either from the Solomon Islands or New Ireland. It may still exist.
- Bornean Baillon's crake, Zapornia pusilla mira (Borneo, 20th century?)
  A subspecies of Baillon's crake known from a single 1912 specimen and not found since; it may be extinct, but the species is hard to find.
- Moroccan bustard, Ardeotis arabs lynesi (Morocco, late 20th century?)
  A subspecies of the Arabian bustard. Last observed in 1993 at Lac Merzouga / Lac Tamezguidat.
- Luzon sarus crane, Antigone antigone luzonica (Luzon, Philippines, late 1960s)
  A subspecies of the sarus crane which is not always accepted as valid by all authorities, possibly because the existing specimens have not been thoroughly studied since it was first described.

=== Pelecaniformes ===
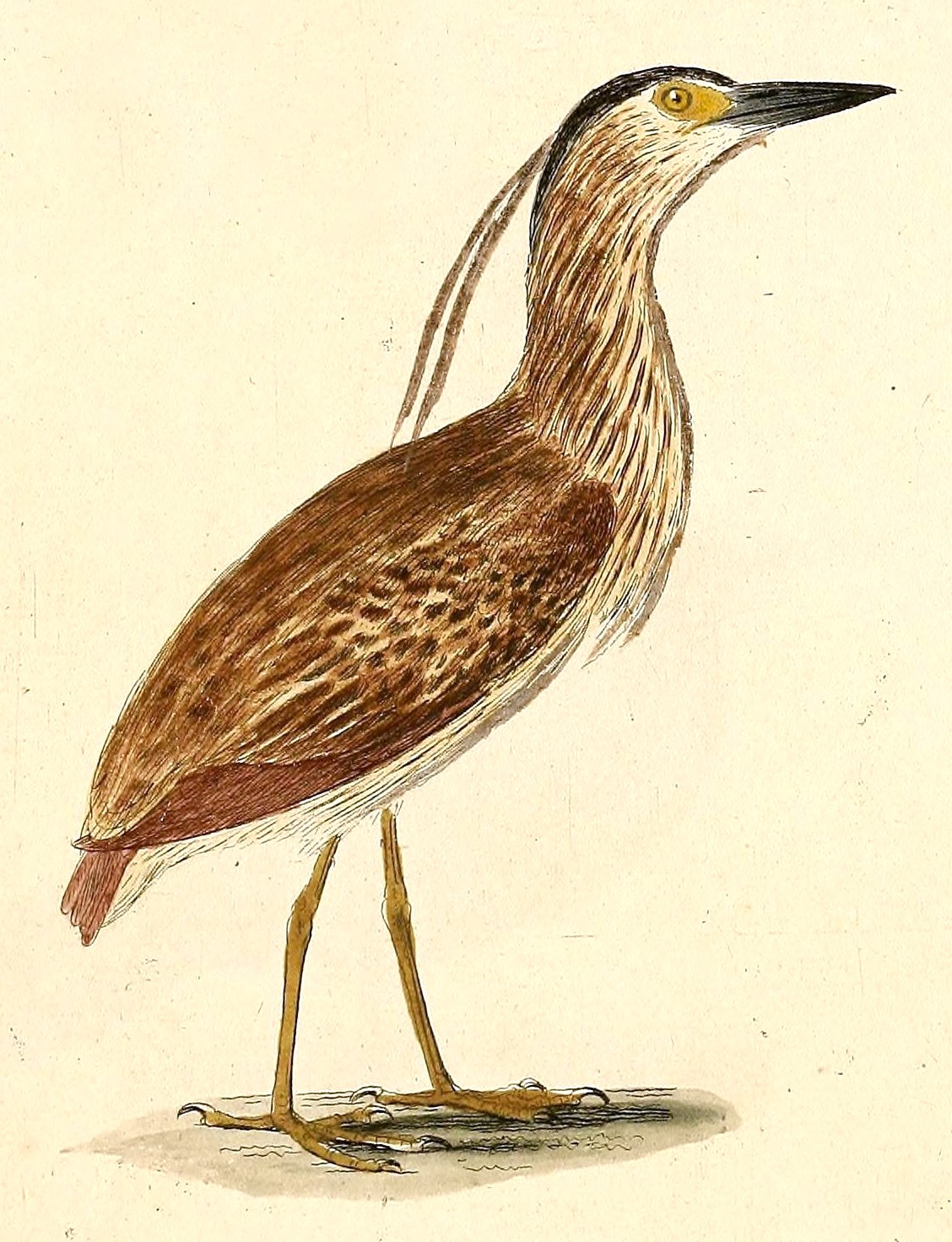
Bonin nankeen night heron

Herons and related birds – possibly paraphyletic

- Ardeidae – herons, egrets, and bitterns
  - Bonin nankeen night heron, Nycticorax caledonicus crassirostris (Nakoudo-jima and Chichi-jima, Ogasawara Islands, c. 1890)
    A subspecies of the nankeen night heron.

=== Columbiformes ===
Pigeons, doves and dodos

- Madeiran wood pigeon, Columba palumbus maderensis (Madeira, East Atlantic, early 20th century)
  A subspecies of the common wood pigeon.
- Lord Howe pigeon, Columba vitiensis godmanae (Lord Howe Island, Southwest Pacific, 1853)
  This subspecies of the metallic pigeon was last recorded in 1853 and almost certainly became extinct by 1869.
- Tongan metallic pigeon, Columba vitiensis ssp. (Vavaʻu, Tonga, late 18th century?)
  This subspecies of the metallic pigeon is only known from a footnote in John Latham's General History of Birds and seems to have become extinct some time before 1800; possibly, however, the location is erroneous and the footnote really refers to the still-existing population on Fiji.
- Réunion pink pigeon, Nesoenas mayeri duboisi (Réunion, Mascarenes, c. 1700)
  A subspecies of the pink pigeon, formerly in Streptopelia. There seems to have been at least another species of pigeon on Réunion (probably a blue pigeon species), but bones have not yet been found. It became extinct at the same time as this subspecies did.
- Amirante turtle dove, Nesoenas picturatus aldabrana (Amirante Islands, Seychelles, late 20th century)
  This subspecies of the Malagasy turtle dove survived until at least 1974, after which it was hybridised out of existence through crossbreeding with the introduced nominate subspecies (N. p. picturatus).
- Catanduanes bleeding-heart, Gallicolumba luzonica rubiventris (Catanduanes, Philippines, late 20th century?)
  A subspecies of the Luzon bleeding-heart known from a single specimen collected in 1971. There have been recent reports of this bird and, as much of its forest habitat still remains, it is likely that it may still exist.
- Basilan bleeding-heart, Gallicolumba crinigera bartletti (Basilan, Philippines, mid-20th century?)
  A subspecies of the Mindanao bleeding-heart last reported in 1925 and, given the massive habitat destruction, is likely extinct.
- Vella Lavella ground dove, Pampusana jobiensis chalconota (Vella Lavella, Makira and Guadalcanal, Solomon Islands, late 20th century?)
  A subspecies of the white-breasted ground dove or possibly a distinct species. Known from only four specimens; there are no recent records and the natives report that it has disappeared.
- White-headed Polynesian ground dove, Pampusana erythroptera albicollis (Central Tuamotu Islands, 20th century?)
  This subspecies of the Polynesian ground dove, often referred to as P. e. pectoralis, became extinct at an undetermined date, but it may still exist on some unsurveyed atolls. The identity of the northern Tuamotu population, which may also possibly still exist, is undetermined to date.
- Ebon crimson-crowned fruit dove, Ptilinopus porphyraceus marshallianus (Ebon?, Marshall Islands, late 19th century?)
  A subspecies of the crimson-crowned fruit dove of doubtful validity known from a single specimen collected in 1859; it is not certain whether or not this bird actually did occur on Ebon. All that can be said is that this subspecies is no longer found anywhere.
- Mauke lilac-crowned fruit dove, Ptilinopus rarotongensis "byronensis" (Mauke, Cook Islands, mid- or late 19th century)
  A subspecies of the lilac-crowned fruit dove known only from the description of a now-lost specimen. The prehistorically extinct population on Mangaia likely belongs to another distinct subspecies also.
- Negros spotted imperial pigeon, Ducula carola nigrorum (Negros and probably Siquijor, late 20th century?)
  A subspecies of the spotted imperial pigeon not recorded since the 1950s.
- Norfolk pigeon, Hemiphaga novaeseelandiae spadicea (Norfolk Island, Southwest Pacific, early 20th century)
  A subspecies of the kererū or New Zealand pigeon not recorded since 1900. Similar birds were reported from Lord Howe Island; these seem to represent another extinct subspecies, but are undescribed to date.
- Raoul Island kererū, Hemiphaga novaeseelandiae ssp. nov. (Raoul, Kermadec Islands, 19th century)
  Another undescribed subspecies of the kererū or New Zealand pigeon or possibly a distinct species; known from bones and a brief report.

=== Cuculiformes ===
Cuckoos

- Greater crested coua, Coua cristata maxima (southeastern Madagascar, late 20th century?)
  A subspecies of the crested coua, known only from a single specimen taken in 1950. It may be a hybrid but if it is not, it is probably extinct.
- Assumption Island coucal, Centropus toulou assumptionis (Assumption Island, Seychelles, early 20th century)
  A subspecies of the Malagasy coucal last recorded in 1906. It is sometimes considered synonymous with the Aldabra subspecies (C. t. insularis) which has since recolonized Assumption Island.
- Cabo San Lucas groove-billed ani, Crotophaga sulcirostris pallidula (Mexico, c. 1940)
  A weakly differentiated and probably invalid subspecies of the groove-billed ani.
- Bahia rufous-vented ground cuckoo, Neomorphus geoffroyi maximiliani (eastern Brazil, mid-20th century?)
  A subspecies of the rufous-vented ground cuckoo.

=== Strigiformes ===
True owls and barn owls

Strigidae – true owls

- Sulu reddish scops owl, Otus rufescens burbidgei (Sulu, Philippines, mid-20th century)
  A subspecies of the reddish scops owl only known from a single questionable specimen. It may be invalid.
- Virgin Islands owl, Gymnasio nudipes newtoni (Virgin Islands, West Indies, 20th century?)
  A subspecies of the Puerto Rican owl of somewhat doubtful validity, which occurred on several of the Virgin Islands. The last reliable records were in 1860; there were a number of unconfirmed reports during the 20th century, but it was not found in thorough surveys in 1995.
- Socorro elf owl, Micrathene whitneyi graysoni (Socorro, Revillagigedo Islands, mid-20th century?)
  A subspecies of the elf owl officially classified as critically endangered. The last specimen was taken in 1932, but there was apparently still a large population in 1958; it was not found in subsequent searches and it appears to have become extinct.
- Antiguan burrowing owl, Athene cunicularia amaura (Antigua, St. Kitts and Nevis, West Indies, c. 1900)
  A subspecies of the burrowing owl, last collected in 1890 and extinct by 1903.
- Guadeloupe burrowing owl, Athene cunicularia guadeloupensis (Guadeloupe and Marie-Galante, West Indies, c. 1890)
  Another subspecies of the burrowing owl, extinct by 1890.
- Lord Howe boobook, Ninox novaeseelandiae albaria (Lord Howe Island, Southwest Pacific, 1950s)
  A subspecies of the morepork last recorded in the 1950s.
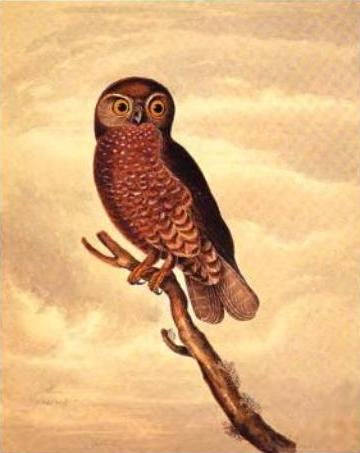
- Norfolk boobook
  Norfolk boobook, Ninox novaeseelandiae undulata (Norfolk Island, Southwest Pacific, 1990s)
  Individuals of the nominate subspecies of the morepork were introduced in a last-ditch effort to save the local owl population. There now exists a hybrid population of a few dozen birds; the last certainly distinct individual of N. n. undulata, a female named Miamiti, died in 1996, though individuals descended from her remain.

Tytonidae – barn owls

- Cave-nesting masked owl, Tyto novaehollandiae troughtoni (Nullarbor Plain, Australia, 1960s)
  Doubtfully distinct from the nominate subspecies of the Australian masked owl, but differed behaviorally.
- Buru masked owl, Tyto sororcula cayelii (Buru, Indonesia, mid-20th century?)
  A subspecies of the Moluccan masked owl last recorded in 1921; the identity of a similar bird found on Seram remains to be determined. It may still exist, as an owl matching this bird's description was encountered in August 2006.
- Peleng masked owl, Tyto rosenbergii pelengensis (Peleng, Banggai Islands, mid-20th century)
  A subspecies of the Sulawesi masked owl or a distinct species. It may possibly still exist, but the only known specimen was taken in 1938 and there have been no further records since then.
- Samar bay owl, Phodilus badius riverae (Samar, Philippines, mid-20th century)
  A subspecies of the Oriental bay owl or a possibly distinct species. Its taxonomy is doubtful, but the only known specimen was lost in a 1945 bombing raid, so its validity cannot be verified; no population exists on Samar today.

=== Apodiformes ===
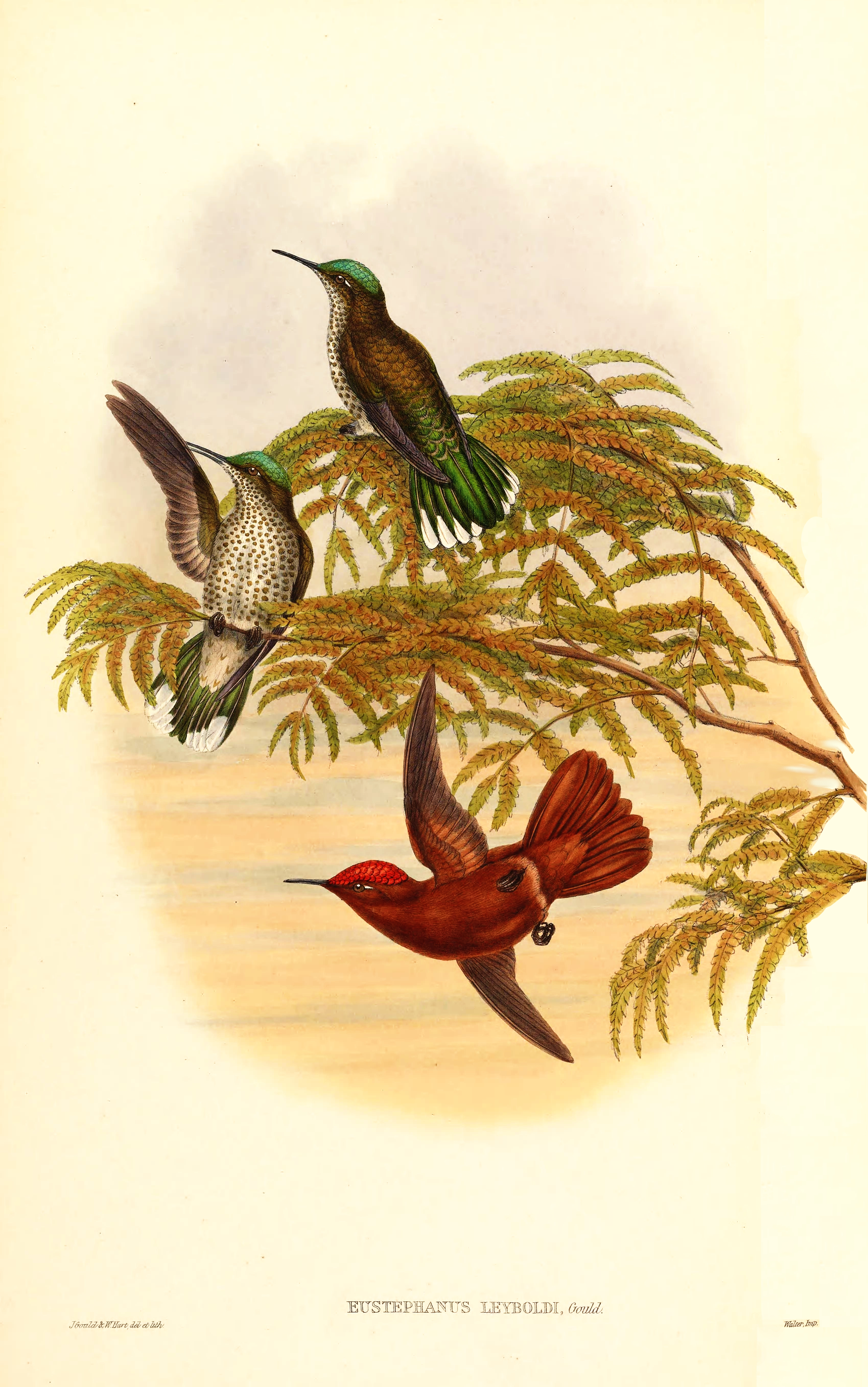
Alejandro Selkirk firecrown

Swifts and hummingbirds

- Miravalles indigo-capped hummingbird, Saucerottia cyanifrons alfaroana (Costa Rica, Central America, 20th century?)
  This subspecies of the indigo-capped hummingbird is only known from a specimen collected in Costa Rica in 1895. It is likely to have become extinct since then.
- Alejandro Selkirk firecrown, Sephanoides fernandensis leyboldi (Alejandro Selkirk Island, Juan Fernández Islands, Southeast Pacific, 1908)
  A subspecies of the Juan Fernández firecrown last recorded in 1908.
- Luzon Whitehead's swiftlet, Aerodramus whiteheadi whiteheadi (Luzon, Philippines, 20th century?)
  The nominate subspecies of Whitehead's swiftlet is only known from four specimens collected at Mount Data in 1895. Because of the lack of further records and massive habitat destruction, it is usually considered extinct. Given the size of the island, though, it may still exist.

=== Coraciiformes ===
Kingfishers and related birds

- Sangihe dwarf kingfisher, Ceyx fallax sangirensis (Sangihe, Indonesia, 1998?)
  This subspecies of the Sulawesi dwarf kingfisher was last seen in 1997 but not during a thorough survey one year later; it is either close to extinction or already extinct. Sometimes it is said to occur on the Talaud Islands also, but this is erroneous.
- Guadalcanal little kingfisher, Ceyx pusillus aolae (Guadalcanal, Solomon Islands, ?)
  A subspecies of the little kingfisher.
- Rarotonga kingfisher, Todiramphus cf. tutus (Rarotonga, Cook Islands, mid-1980s?)
  There exist reports of locals that kingfishers – probably a subspecies of the chattering kingfisher (Todiramphus tutus) which is found on neighboring islands, but possibly vagrants from there – were found until around 1979 and there is a last record from 1984. Presently, no kingfishers are known to exist on Rarotonga.
- "Ryukyu kingfisher", "Todiramphus cinnamominus miyakoensis" (Miyako-jima, Ryukyu Islands, late 19th century)
  Previously considered as a distinct species, then reclassified as a subspecies of the Guam kingfisher. Only seen once by scientists in 1887; the specimen taken is somewhat damaged, making identification by anything other than molecular analysis difficult. It is now thought likely that the specimen came from Guam, where the aforementioned species was distributed, rather than Miyako, which would make this subspecies invalid (it was declared invalid by the International Ornithological Congress in 2022).
- Sakarha pygmy kingfisher, Corythornis madagascariensis dilutus (southwestern Madagascar, late 20th century?)
  This subspecies of the Madagascar pygmy kingfisher is only known from one specimen taken in 1974 in an area where most of its habitat had already been destroyed. However, there have been records of the species (or an uncertain subspecies) from near the type locality, suggesting it is likely that it may still exist.
- Ticao hornbill, Penelopides panini ticaensis (Ticao, Philippines, 1970s)
  A subspecies of the Visayan hornbill of somewhat uncertain taxonomic status (it was possibly either a distinct species or a color morph); the last confirmed report was in 1971 and it became extinct shortly thereafter.

=== Piciformes ===
Woodpeckers and related birds

- Grand Bahama West Indian woodpecker, Melanerpes superciliaris bahamensis (Grand Bahama, Bahamas, 1950s)
  A subspecies of the West Indian woodpecker of somewhat uncertain validity.
- Javan buff-rumped woodpecker, Meiglyptes tristis tristis (Java, Indonesia, c. 1920?)
  The nominate subspecies of the buff-rumped woodpecker became rare during the 19th century due to habitat destruction. The last confirmed record was in 1880, and it is now considered to be at least very rare.
- Guadalupe red-shafted flicker, Colaptes auratus rufipileus (Guadalupe Island, East Pacific, c. 1906)
  A subspecies of the northern flicker (formerly considered to be a subspecies of the red-shafted flicker, as C. cafer rufipileus), it was last recorded in 1906 and not found again in both 1911 and 1922. It may be invalid. Recently, vagrant birds of a mainland red-shafted northern flicker subspecies (which one is unknown) have begun recolonizing the island as the habitat improved after the extirpation of feral goats.
- Northern white-mantled barbet, Capito hypoleucus hypoleucus (Colombia, extant)
  The nominate subspecies of the white-mantled barbet has been considered extinct, but has been recorded recently.
- Botero white-mantled barbet, Capito hypoleucus carrikeri (Colombia, extant)
  Another subspecies of the white-mantled barbet, also considered extinct by some sources, but confirmed extant by researchers in Colombia.
- Todd's jacamar, Brachygalba lugubris phaeonota (Brazil, late 20th century?)
  A subspecies of the brown jacamar, or possibly a hybrid, a color morph or a distinct species. It may still exist, as it is only known from a remote and seldom-visited area.
- Cebu white-bellied woodpecker, Dryocopus javensis cebuensis (Cebu, Philippines, 20th century)
  A subspecies of the white-bellied woodpecker only known by three specimens collected before 1900.

=== Accipitriformes ===
Hawks, eagles, kites, and vultures

Accipitridae

- Milvus
  - Cape Verde kite, Milvus (milvus) fasciicauda (Cape Verde Islands, East Atlantic, 2000)
  Considered either a subspecies of the red kite, a distinct species, or a hybrid between the red and black kite (Milvus migrans), the validity of this taxon has recently been questioned on the basis of molecular analysis; however, hybridization and a confusing molecular phylogeny of red kite populations, coupled with the distinct phenotype of the Cape Verde birds, suggest that the taxonomic status of this form is far from resolved.
- Accipiter
  - Car Nicobar sparrowhawk, Accipiter butleri butleri (Car Nicobar, Nicobar Islands, 20th century?)
  The nominate subspecies of the Nicobar sparrowhawk – a species which is itself currently classified as vulnerable – is possibly extinct. It was last reliably recorded in 1901 and, despite searches, has not been sighted after an unconfirmed record in 1977; however, the species is known for being very shy and a population may persist unrecorded.

=== Falconiformes ===
Falcons

- Volcano Islands peregrine falcon, Falco peregrinus furuitii (Ogasawara Islands, 1940s)
  A subspecies of the peregrine falcon from the Ogasawara Islands. No sightings have been reported since 1945. A survey in 1982 failed to record it. Only known from Iwo Jima and Torishima.

=== Psittaciformes ===
Parrots

- Sangir red-and-blue lory, Eos histrio histrio (Sangir Archipelago, Indonesia, 1990s?)
  The nominate subspecies of the red-and-blue lory was hybridised out of existence through crossbreeding with escaped captive individuals of its other still-existing subspecies, Challenger's red-and-blue lory (E. h. challengeri), with the last certainly distinct individuals disappearing in the 1990s or even much earlier than that.
- Réunion parakeet, Psittacula eques eques (Réunion, Mascarenes, mid-18th century)
  Known only from a painting and descriptions; the nominate subspecies of the echo parakeet, with the other one being the still-existing Mauritius parakeet (P. e. echo).
- Siquijor hanging parrot, Loriculus philippensis siquijorensis (Siquijor, Philippines, 20th century?)
  A subspecies of the Philippine hanging parrot or colasisi; it is either very rare or already extinct.
- Sinú brown-throated parakeet, Eupsittula pertinax griseipecta (Colombia, mid- or late 20th century?)
  A subspecies of the brown-throated parakeet known from only two specimens collected in 1949 which are of unclear taxonomic and conservation status.
- Culebra Island amazon, Amazona vittata gracilipes (Culebra Island, West Indies, early 20th century)
  A weakly differentiated subspecies of the Puerto Rican amazon, which is itself highly endangered.

=== Passeriformes ===
Perching birds

Pittidae – pittas

- Bougainville black-faced pitta, Pitta anerythra pallida (Bougainville, Solomon Islands, mid-20th century?)
  A subspecies of the black-faced pitta. Once common on Bougainville; not recorded since 1938, but it is likely to have been overlooked.
- Choiseul black-faced pitta, Pitta anerythra nigrifrons (Choiseul, Solomon Islands, late 20th century?)
  Another subspecies of the black-faced pitta. Not found during recent searches; doubtful records from nearby islands, but it is also likely to have been overlooked.

Tyrannidae – tyrant flycatchers

- Bogotá bearded tachuri, Polystictus pectoralis bogotensis (central Colombia, 20th century)
  A subspecies of the bearded tachuri or possibly a distinct species that has not been recorded for some time and is now extinct.
- Grenadan Euler's flycatcher, Lathrotriccus euleri flaviventris (Grenada, West Indies, 1950s?)
  A subspecies of Euler's flycatcher formerly known as Empidonax euleri johnstoni. It has not been recorded since the 1950s.

Furnariidae – ovenbirds

- Peruvian scale-throated earthcreeper, Upucerthia dumetaria peruana (Peru, 20th century?)
  A subspecies of the scale-throated earthcreeper; it is known only from two specimens taken in the early 1950s at Puno, Peru and has not been seen or found since. It may still exist, as there is no obvious reason why it should have become extinct.
- Northern stripe-crowned spinetail, Cranioleuca pyrrhophia rufipennis (northern Bolivia, 20th century?)
  A subspecies of the stripe-crowned spinetail known only from a few specimens and not recorded since the 1950s; it may be endangered or possibly extinct.

Formicariidae – antpittas and antthrushes

- Northern giant antpitta, Grallaria gigantea lehmanni (Colombia, 20th century?)
  A subspecies of the giant antpitta (or possibly of the great antpitta, in which case it would be G. excelsa lehmanni) apparently not recorded since the 1940s. It may still exist in Puracé National Natural Park, where there is plentiful habitat remaining.
- Antioquia brown-banded antpitta, Grallaria milleri gilesi (Antioquia, Colombia, 20th century?)
  A subspecies of the brown-banded antpitta recently described from a specimen collected in 1878. It has not been recorded since, despite surveys at a number of likely locations.

Maluridae – Australasian "wrens"

- MacDonnell Ranges thick-billed grasswren, Amytornis modestus modestus (Northern Territory, Australia, 1936)
  The nominate subspecies of the thick-billed grasswren. The last record was a clutch of eggs taken in 1936.
- Namoi thick-billed grasswren, Amytornis modestus inexpectatus (New South Wales, Australia, 1886)
  Another subspecies of the thick-billed grasswren last recorded in 1886.
- Large-tailed grasswren, Amytornis textilis macrourus (Western Australia, 1910)
  A subspecies of the western grasswren last collected in 1910 and extinct since then.

Pardalotidae – pardalotes, scrubwrens, thornbills and gerygones

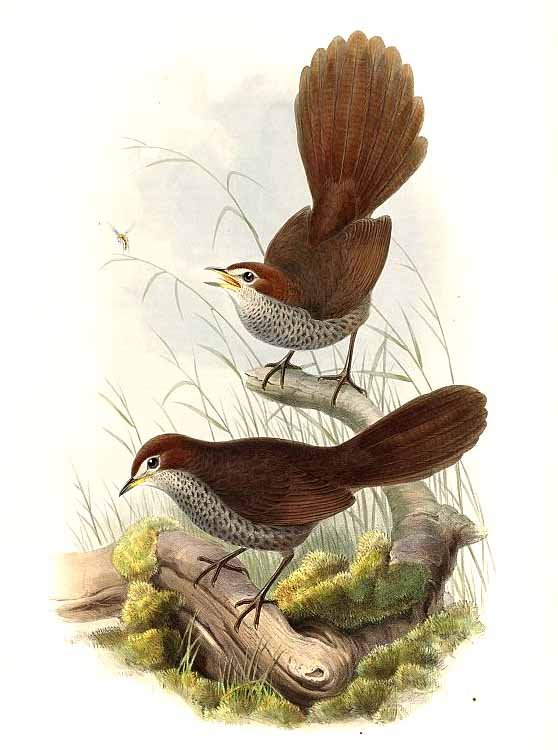
Western rufous bristlebird

- Western rufous bristlebird, Dasyornis broadbenti littoralis (Australia, mid-20th century)
  A subspecies of the rufous bristlebird not recorded since 1940 despite a number of surveys since then, beginning in the 1970s.
- King Island brown thornbill, Acanthiza pusilla archibaldi (King Island, Australia, likely extant)
  A subspecies of the brown thornbill which has only been recorded about 10 times since its discovery and is considered extinct by some authorities. The latest record comes from 2002, suggesting a population is likely to still exist, but it is very rare.

Petroicidae – Australasian "robins"

- Tiwi Island hooded robin, Melanodryas cucullata melvillensis (Tiwi Islands, Australia, 1992)
  A subspecies of the hooded robin last observed in 1992 and not found in exhaustive searches later in the 1990s.

Cinclosomatidae – whipbirds and allies

- Mount Lofty spotted quail-thrush, Cinclosoma punctatum anachoreta (Australia, mid-1980s?)
  A subspecies of the spotted quail-thrush last recorded in 1983 and not found in a survey the following year.

Artamidae – woodswallows, currawongs and allies

- Western pied currawong, Strepera graculina ashbyi (Victoria, Australia, 1927)
  This subspecies of the pied currawong has been hybridised out of existence by crossbreeding with other subspecies, which probably came into contact with it following habitat destruction in the 1830s. The last certainly distinct individuals were recorded in 1927.

Monarchidae – monarch flycatchers

- Negros celestial monarch, Hypothymis coelestis rabori (Negros and possibly Sibuyan, Philippines, late 20th century?)
  A subspecies of the celestial monarch; not uncommon on Negros in 1959, but not recorded since then. A single Sibuyan specimen from an unspecified locality taken in the 19th century is the only record for this island.
- Hiva Oa monarch, Pomarea mendozae mendozae (Hiva Oa and Tahuata, Marquesas, late 20th century)
  The nominate subspecies of the Marquesas monarch which was very rare by 1974 and not found during multiple surveys in the 1990s.

Rhipiduridae – fantails

- Lord Howe fantail, Rhipidura fuliginosa cervina (Lord Howe Island, Southwest Pacific, c. 1924)
  A subspecies of the New Zealand fantail that was considered virtually extinct in 1924 and not found by surveys four years later.
- Guam rufous fantail, Rhipidura versicolor uraniae (Guam and Marianas, West Pacific, 1984)
  A subspecies of the Micronesian rufous fantail; a conspicuous bird which has not been recorded since 1984.

Campephagidae – cuckooshrikes and trillers

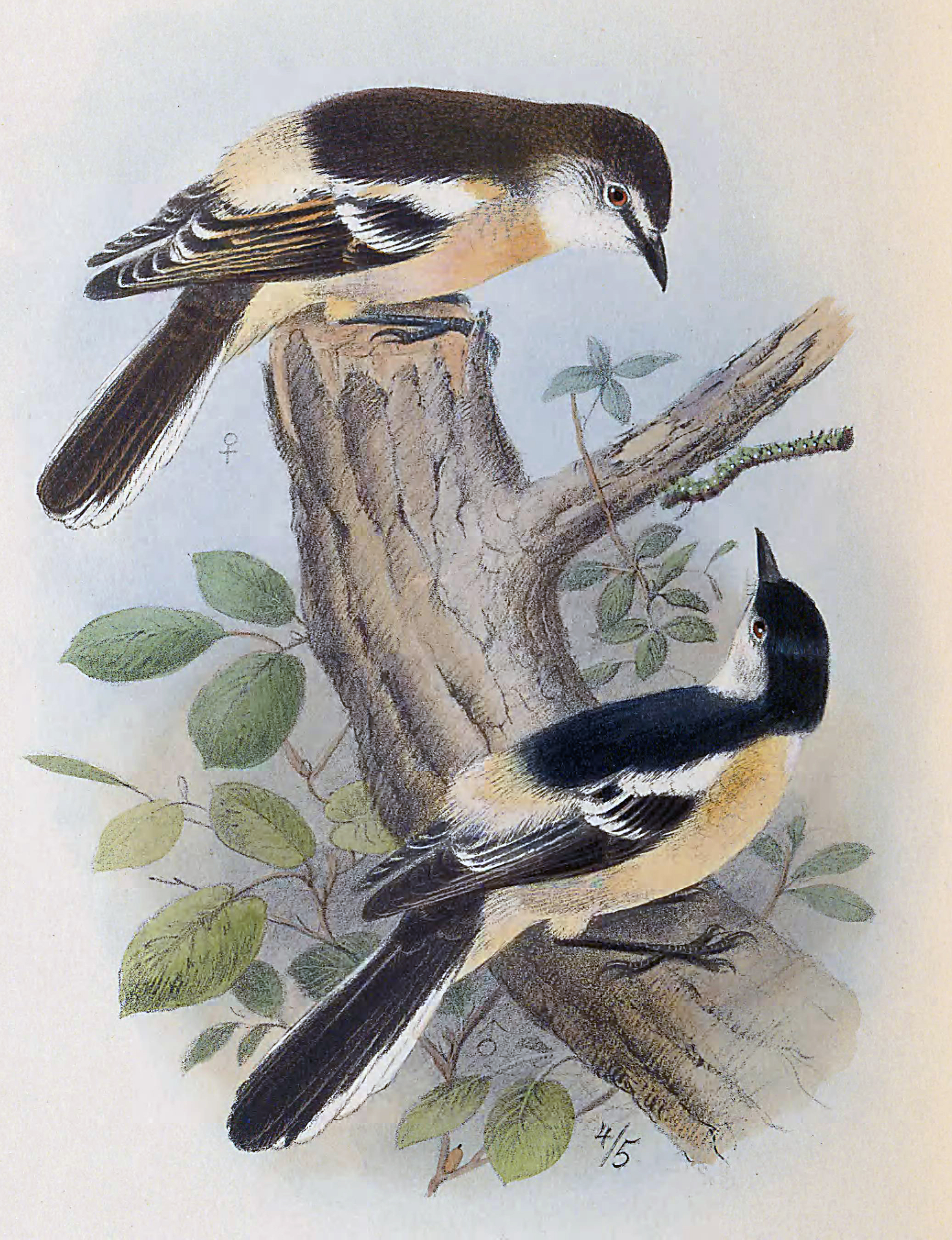
Norfolk triller

- Cebu bar-bellied cuckooshrike, Coracina striata cebuensis (Cebu, Philippines, early 20th century)
  A subspecies of the bar-bellied cuckooshrike not recorded since its collection in 1906.
- Maros cicadabird, Edolisoma tenuirostre edithae (Sulawesi, mid-20th century)
  A subspecies of the common cicadabird known from a single specimen collected in 1931; quite possibly just a vagrant individual.
- Cebu blackish cuckooshrike, Edolisoma coerulescens altera (Cebu, Philippines, 20th century?)
  A subspecies of the blackish cuckooshrike; it may still exist, as this bird is rather unmistakable, and a 1999 record is therefore likely to be valid, though surveys since then have failed to record it.
- Marinduque blackish cuckooshrike, Edolisoma coerulescens deschauenseei (Marinduque, Philippines, late 20th century?)
  Another subspecies of the blackish cuckooshrike; described from specimens collected in 1971, but apparently not seen since then. As few ornithologists have visited Marinduque and forest remains on the island, it is likely that it may still exist.
- Norfolk long-tailed triller, Lalage leucopyga leucopyga (Norfolk Island, Southwest Pacific, 1942)
  The nominate subspecies of the long-tailed triller or possibly a distinct species.

Oriolidae – Old World orioles and allies

- Cebu dark-throated oriole, Oriolus xanthonotus assimilis (Cebu, Philippines, 20th century?)
  A subspecies of the dark-throated oriole not confirmed since 1906, though there were unconfirmed reports c. 2001, suggesting a possibility that it may still exist.

Corvidae – crows, ravens, jays and magpies

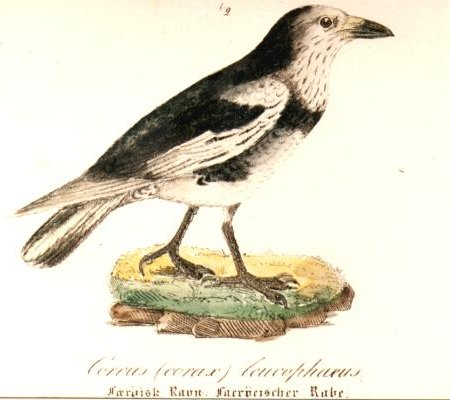
Pied raven, a color morph of the common raven

- Pied raven, Corvus corax varius morpha leucophaeus (Faroe Islands, North Atlantic, 1902)
  A distinct local white-with-black-markings and light brown-billed color morph of the North Atlantic raven, a subspecies of the common raven, found only on the Faroe Islands and not seen since 1902. Birds currently living on the Faroe Islands and on Iceland (the only other area in this subspecies' range) are all-black and black-billed; this still-existing color morph is named Corvus corax varius morpha typicus.

Regulidae – kinglets

- Guadalupe ruby-crowned kinglet, Corthylio calendula obscurus (Guadalupe Island, East Pacific, 20th century)
  A subspecies of the ruby-crowned kinglet that has not been recorded since 1953.

Hirundinidae – swallows and martins

- Jamaican golden swallow, Tachycineta euchrysea euchrysea (Jamaica, West Indies, c. 1990?)
  The nominate subspecies of the golden swallow; endemic to Jamaica. The last major roost site was destroyed in 1987 and the last confirmed sighting was in 1989. It may still exist in the Cockpit Country.

Phylloscopidae – phylloscopid warblers or leaf warblers

- Eastern Canary Islands chiffchaff, Phylloscopus canariensis exsul (Lanzarote and possibly Fuerteventura, Canary Islands, 20th century?)
  A subspecies of the Canary Islands chiffchaff; it was probably extinct by 1986.

Cettiidae – cettiid warblers or typical bush warblers

- Babar stubtail, Urosphena subulata advena (Babar, Indonesia, extant)
  A subspecies of the Timor stubtail that has been considered extinct, but was recorded as common on Babar in 2009 and 2011.
- Western Turner's eremomela, Eremomela turneri kalindei (Congo Basin, Africa, late 20th century?)
  The West African subspecies of Turner's eremomela has not been recorded since the end of the 1970s, but there is unsurveyed habitat in its range where it is likely that it may still exist. Its placement in Cettiidae requires confirmation.

Acrocephalidae – acrocephalid warblers or marsh warblers, tree warblers and reed warblers

- Marshall Islands reed warbler, Acrocephalus rehsei ssp.? (Marshall Islands, Micronesia, c. 1880?)
  Oral tradition and some early reports mention a bird called the annañ which inhabited some of the Marshall Islands. The best match is the Nauru reed warbler; the annañ might have been an undescribed subspecies of that species or a distinct but related species of reed warbler.
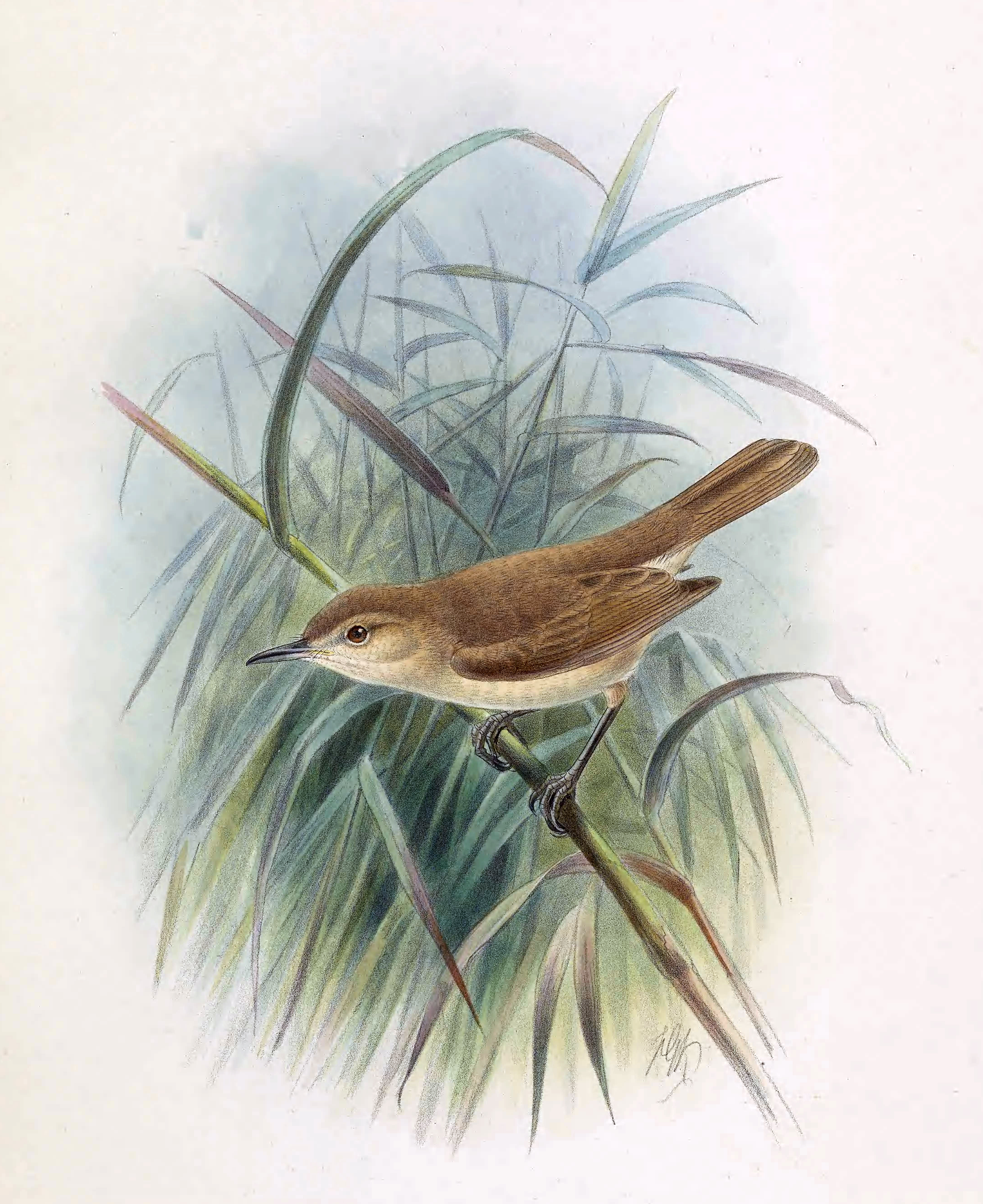
- Laysan millerbird
  Laysan millerbird, Acrocephalus familiaris familiaris (Laysan, Hawaiian Islands, late 1910s)
  The nominate subspecies of the millerbird.

Pycnonotidae – bulbuls

- Sumatran blue-wattled bulbul, Brachypodius nieuwenhuisii inexspectatus (Sumatra, Indonesia, late 20th century?)
  A subspecies of the blue-wattled bulbul known only from a single specimen taken in 1937; however, this entire "species" may actually be a hybrid.

Cisticolidae – cisticolas and allies

- Northern white-winged apalis, Apalis chariessa chariessa (Kenya, Africa, late 20th century?)
  The nominate subspecies of the white-winged apalis remains known only from the Tana River, a centre of endemism. It was last recorded in 1961.

Sylviidae – sylviid ("true") warblers and parrotbills

- Vanua Levu long-legged thicketbird, Cincloramphus rufus clunei (Vanua Levu, Fiji, late 20th century?)
  A subspecies of the long-legged thicketbird; it was found only once, but there was an unconfirmed sighting in 1990, suggesting that it may still exist. Its placement in Sylviidae is doubtful.
- Fayyum warbler, Curruca melanocephala / momus norissae (Egypt, Africa, 1939)
  A doubtfully distinct subspecies of the Sardinian warbler. It has not been recorded since 1939.

Zosteropidae – white-eyes. Probably belong in Timaliidae.

- Mukojima white-eye, Apalopteron familiare familiare (Mukojima Group, Ogasawara Islands, 20th century?)
  The nominate subspecies of the Bonin white-eye (formerly known as the "Bonin honeyeater") not recorded since its last specimen was collected in 1930.

Timaliidae – Old World babblers

- Vanderbilt's babbler, Malacocincla sepiaria vanderbilti (Sumatra, Indonesia, late 20th century?)
  An enigmatic subspecies of Horsfield's babbler known from a single specimen. It has not been seen since the 1940s at the latest.
- Burmese Jerdon's babbler, Chrysomma altirostre altirostre (Myanmar, 20th century?)
  The nominate subspecies of Jerdon's babbler was last confirmed in 1941, but as there has been little fieldwork in its range and a possible sighting occurred in 1994, it is considered likely that it may still exist.

"African warblers"

- Chapin's white-browed crombec, Sylvietta leucophrys chapini (Congo Basin, Africa, late 20th century?)
  A subspecies of the white-browed crombec or possibly a distinct species. Restricted to the Lendu Plateau; it is probably rare, though unsurveyed forest remains where it is likely that it may still exist.

Sylvioidea incertae sedis

- Lake Amik bearded reedling, Panurus biarmicus kosswigi (southern Turkey, extant)
  A subspecies of the bearded reedling which was once considered to be extinct due to the drainage of Lake Amik, but still exists in the area.

Troglodytidae – wrens

- San Benedicto rock wren, Salpinctes obsoletus exsul (San Benedicto, Revillagigedo Islands, 1952)
  A subspecies of the rock wren which became extinct c. 9:00 AM, August 1, 1952, when its island habitat was destroyed by a massive volcanic eruption.
- Guadalupe Bewick's wren, Thryomanes bewickii brevicauda (Guadalupe Island, East Pacific, late 1890s?)
  A subspecies of Bewick's wren. An extinction date of "1903" seems to be in error; the last unquestionable record dates from 1897 and a thorough search in 1901 failed to record it.
- San Clemente Bewick's wren, Thryomanes bewickii leucophrys (San Clemente Island, East Pacific, 1941)
  Another subspecies of Bewick's wren last recorded in 1941.
- Daito wren, Troglodytes troglodytes orii (Daito Islands, Northwest Pacific, c. 1940)
  A disputed subspecies of the Eurasian wren; it is known from a single specimen that may have been a vagrant individual and, therefore, it is possibly invalid.
- Guadeloupe house wren, Troglodytes aedon guadeloupensis (Guadeloupe, West Indies, late 20th century?)
  Found in 1914, 1969 and the 1970s; now very rare or already extinct. Its taxonomy is unresolved. A part of the house wren complex; other scientific names for it include T. musculus guadeloupensis and T. guadeloupensis.
- Martinique house wren, Troglodytes aedon martinicensis (Martinique, West Indies, c. 1890)
  Last found in 1886. Its taxonomy is also unresolved. Another part of the house wren complex; other scientific names for it include T. musculus martinicensis and T. martinicensis.

Paridae – tits, chickadees and titmice

- Daito varied tit, Sittiparus varius orii (Daito Islands, Northwest Pacific, 1938)
  A subspecies of the varied tit last recorded in 1938 and not found in subsequent surveys in 1984 and 1986.
- Zagros coal tit, Periparus ater phaeonotus (Zagros Mountains, southwestern Iran, 1870)
  A subspecies of the coal tit only known by the type specimen from 1870.

Cinclidae – dippers

- Cyprus white-throated dipper, Cinclus cinclus olympicus (Cyprus, northeastern Mediterranean, 1945)
  A formerly recognised subspecies of the white-throated dipper that is now considered invalid. It became extinct in 1945.

Muscicapidae – Old World flycatchers and chats

- Tonkean jungle flycatcher, Cyornis colonus subsolanus (Sulawesi, Indonesia, late 20th century?)
  A subspecies of the Sula jungle flycatcher that is known from a single specimen. It may be invalid.
- Chinijo stonechat, Saxicola dacotiae murielae (Chinijo Archipelago, Canary Islands, early 20th century)
  A subspecies of the Canary Islands stonechat.

Turdidae – thrushes and allies

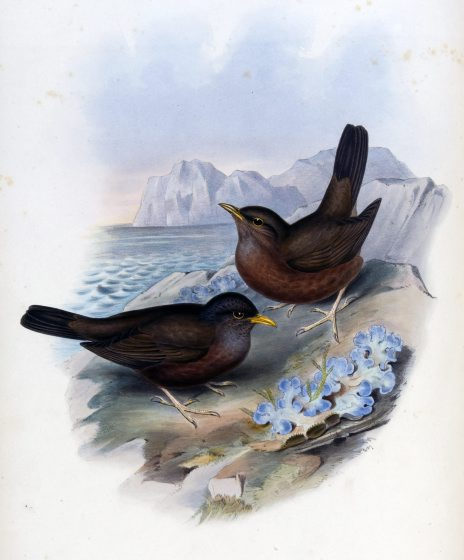
Lord Howe thrush

- Norfolk thrush, Turdus poliocephalus poliocephalus (Norfolk Island, Southwest Pacific, c. 1975)
  The nominate subspecies of the Tasman Sea island thrush last seen in 1975.
- Lord Howe thrush, Turdus poliocephalus vinitinctus (Lord Howe Island, Southwest Pacific, early 20th century)
  The second subspecies of the Tasman Sea island thrush last recorded in 1913 and extinct by 1928.
- Maré thrush, Turdus vanikorensis mareensis (Maré Island, New Caledonia, early 20th century)
  A subspecies of the Vanikoro island thrush last collected in 1911 or 1912 and not found again after 1939.
- Saint Lucia forest thrush, Turdus lherminieri sanctaeluciae (St. Lucia, West Indies, extant)
  A subspecies of the forest thrush. It has been thought to be extinct, but it was recorded at Des Chassin in 2007.
- Peleng red-and-black thrush, Geohichia mendeni mendeni (Peleng, Indonesia, mid-20th century?)
  The nominate subspecies of the red-and-black thrush; little is known about it.
- Kibale black-eared ground thrush, Geohichia camaronensis kibalensis (southwestern Uganda, Africa, late 20th century?)
  A subspecies of the black-eared ground thrush or possibly a distinct species; known only from two specimens, both from 1966. It is likely that it still exists in suitable habitat, but it could already be extinct.
- Choiseul russet-tailed thrush, Zoothera heinei choiseuli (Choiseul, Solomon Islands, mid-20th century?)
  A subspecies of the russet-tailed thrush known from a single specimen found in 1924. It could have been wiped out by introduced feral cats, but the island is poorly known and so it should not be presumed extinct yet.
- Isle of Pines solitaire, Myadestes elisabeth retrusus (Isla de la Juventud, West Indies, 20th century)
  A subspecies of the Cuban solitaire. The last confirmed records were in the 1930s, with unconfirmed reports in the early 1970s.

Mimidae – mockingbirds and thrashers

- Barbados scaly-breasted thrasher, Allenia fusca atlantica (Barbados, West Indies, 1987?)
  A subspecies of the scaly-breasted thrasher last recorded in 1987. Most of its range has been searched since then, with no records known.

Estrildidae – estrildid finches (waxbills, munias, etc.)

- Southern star finch, Bathilda ruficauda ruficauda (Australia, 1995)
  The nominate subspecies of the star finch last recorded in 1995 and not found during later searches in the 1990s. It is not known to survive in captivity.

Fringillidae – true finches and Hawaiian honeycreepers

- San Benito house finch, Haemorhous mexicanus mcgregori (San Benito, East Pacific, c. 1940s)
  A subspecies of the house finch.
- Lanaʻi ʻalauahio, Paroreomyza montana montana (Lanaʻi, Hawaiian Islands, 1937)
  The nominate subspecies of the Maui ʻalauahio (or, more properly, the Maui Nui ʻalauahio), it was last recorded in 1937 and was certainly extinct by 1960.

Icteridae – New World blackbirds and allies

- Grand Cayman oriole, Icterus leucopteryx bairdi (Grand Cayman, West Indies, late 20th century)
  A subspecies of the Jamaican oriole last recorded in 1967.

Parulidae – New World warblers

- New Providence yellowthroat, Geothlypis rostrata rostrata (Andros and New Providence, Bahamas, West Indies, 1990?)
  The nominate subspecies of the Bahama yellowthroat; it is either extinct or almost extinct.

Thraupidae – tanagers

- Gonâve western chat-tanager, Calyptophilus tertius abbotti (Gonâve, West Indies, c. 1980?)
  A subspecies of the western chat-tanager last recorded in 1977 and probably extinct.
- Samaná eastern chat-tanager, Calyptophilus frugivorus frugivorus (eastern Hispaniola, West Indies, late 20th century)
  The nominate subspecies of the eastern chat-tanager; the last (unconfirmed?) record was in 1982 and concerted efforts to record it ever since have failed.
- Darwin's large ground finch, Geospiza magnirostris magnirostris (Floreana Island?, Galápagos Islands, 1957?)
  The (possibly invalid) nominate subspecies of the large ground finch collected by Charles Darwin in 1835; he gave no precise location for it. A similar bird was found in 1957, but no others have been seen since then.
- Saint Kitts bullfinch, Melopyrrha portoricensis grandis (St. Kitts and (prehistorically) Barbuda, West Indies, 1930)
  A subspecies of the Puerto Rican bullfinch.

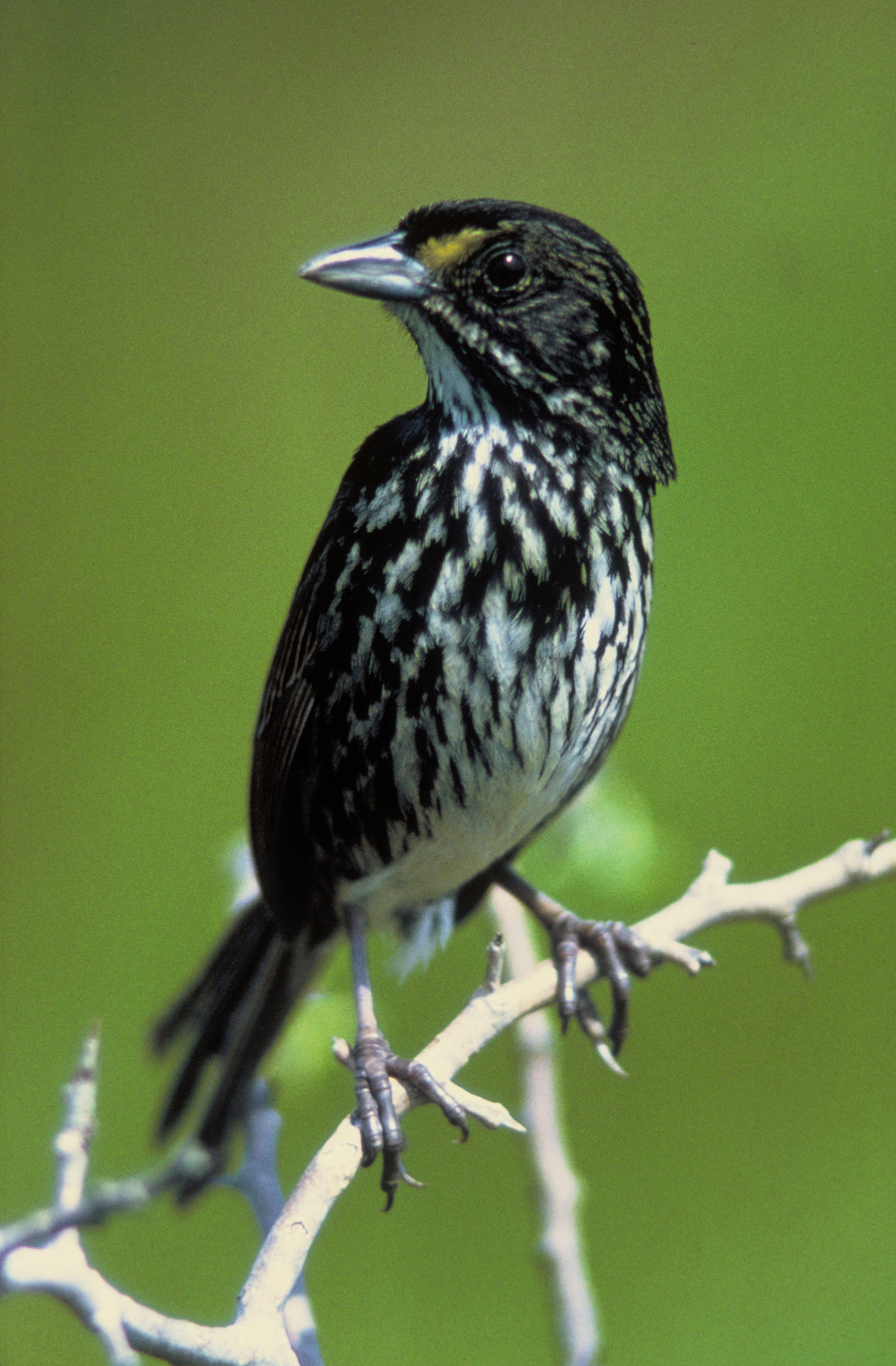
Dusky seaside sparrow

Passerellidae – New World sparrows

- Todos Santos rufous-crowned sparrow, Aimophila ruficeps sanctorum (Islas Todos Santos, East Pacific, 1970s?)
  A subspecies of the rufous-crowned sparrow once common but not recorded during surveys in the 1970s or since then.
- Santa Barbara song sparrow, Melospiza melodia graminea (Santa Barbara Island, North America, late 1960s)
  A subspecies of the song sparrow last seen in 1967; it became extinct due to a severe wildfire in 1959 and subsequent predation by feral cats. Officially declared extinct by the United States Fish and Wildlife Service in 1983.
- Dusky seaside sparrow, Ammospiza maritima nigrescens (Florida, North America, late 1980s)
  A subspecies of the seaside sparrow last recorded in the wild in 1987.
- Guadalupe spotted towhee, Pipilo maculatus consobrinus (Guadalupe Island, East Pacific, c. 1900)
  A subspecies of the spotted towhee.

== See also ==
- Bird extinction
- Dinosaur
- Flightless bird
- Holocene extinction
- Lazarus taxon
- List of bird extinctions by year
- List of fossil bird genera
- List of Late Quaternary prehistoric bird species
- Lists of extinct species
- Origin of birds
