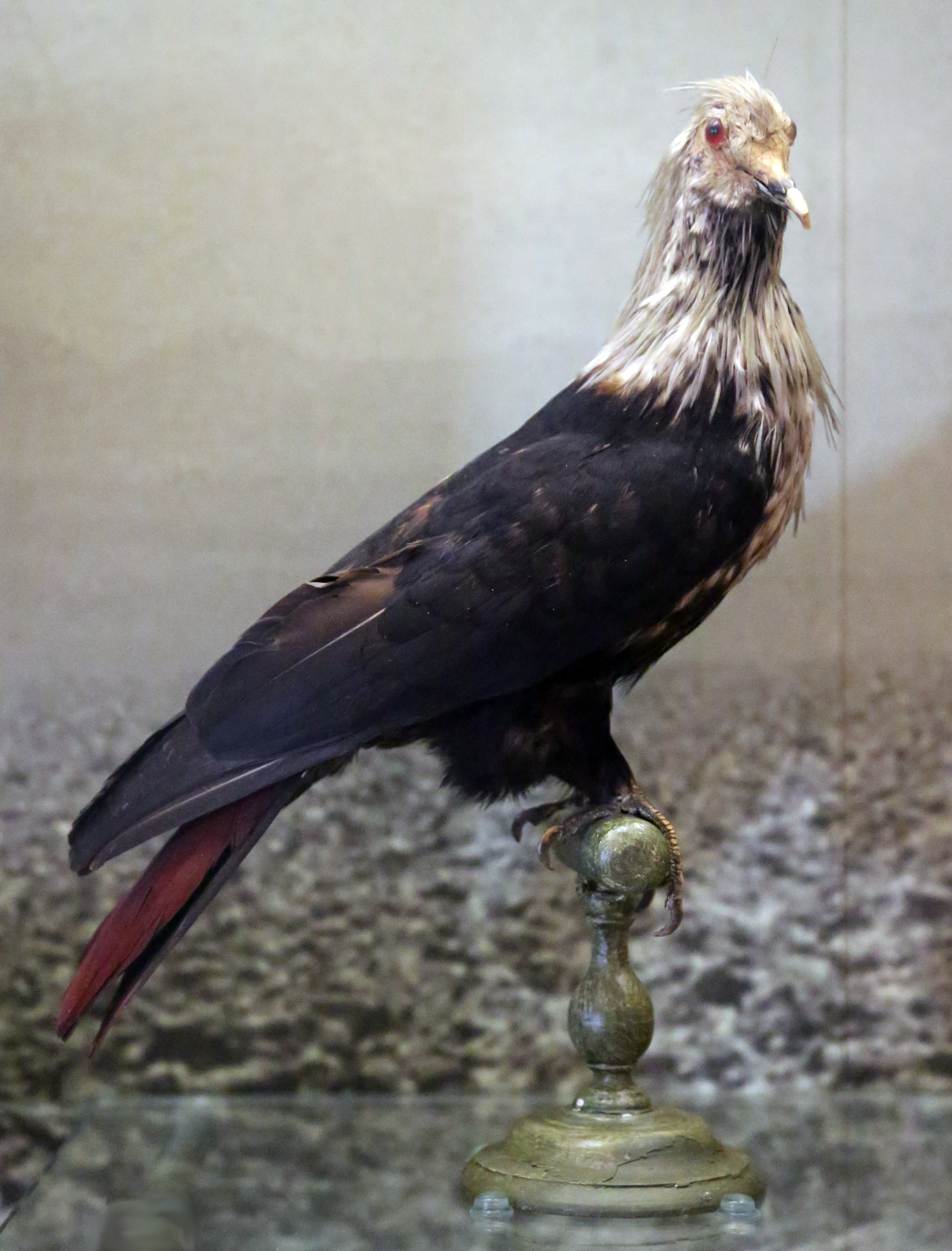
- Mounted skin in the National Museum of Scotland, one of three in existence

Conservation status
- Extinct (ca. 1830s) (IUCN 3.1)

Scientific classification
- Kingdom: Animalia
- Phylum: Chordata
- Class: Aves
- Order: Columbiformes
- Family: Columbidae
- Genus: Alectroenas
- Species: †A. nitidissimus

Binomial name
- †Alectroenas nitidissimus (Scopoli, 1786)
- Location of Mauritius in blue

Synonyms
- List: Columba nitidissima Scopoli, 1786; Columba franciae Gmelin, 1789; Columba batavica Bonnaterre, 1790; Columba jubata Wagler, 1827; Alectroenas franciae Gray, 1840; Alectroenas nitidissimus; Columbigallus franciae Des Murs, 1854; Ptilopus nitidissimus Schlegel & Pollen, 1868

= Mauritius blue pigeon =

Extinct species of bird from Mauritius

The Mauritius blue pigeon (Alectroenas nitidissimus) is an extinct species of blue pigeon formerly endemic to the Mascarene island of Mauritius in the Indian Ocean east of Madagascar. It has two extinct relatives from the Mascarenes and three extant ones from other islands. It is the type species of the genus of blue pigeons, Alectroenas. It had white hackles around the head, neck and breast and blue plumage on the body, and it was red on the tail and the bare parts of the head. These colours were thought similar to those of the Dutch flag, a resemblance reflected in its French common name, Pigeon Hollandais. The juveniles may have been partially green. It was 30 cm (12 in) long and larger and more robust than any other blue pigeon species. It fed on fruits, nuts, and molluscs, and was once widespread in the forests of Mauritius.

The bird was first mentioned in the 17th century and was described several times thereafter, but very few accounts describe the behaviour of living specimens. The oldest record of the species is two sketches from a 1601–1603 ship's journal. Several stuffed specimens reached Europe in the 18th and 19th centuries, while only three stuffed specimens exist today. A live bird kept in the Netherlands around 1790 was long thought to have been a Mauritius blue pigeon, but examination of illustrations depicting it have shown it was most likely a Seychelles blue pigeon. The species is thought to have become extinct in the 1830s due to deforestation and predation.

== Taxonomy ==
The oldest record of the Mauritius blue pigeon is two sketches in the 1601–1603 journal of the Dutch ship Gelderland. The birds appear to have been freshly killed or stunned. The drawings were made by the Dutch artist Joris Joostensz Laerle on Mauritius, but were not published until 1969. François Cauche in 1651 briefly mentioned "white, black and red turtle doves", encountered in 1638, which is thought to be the first unequivocal mention of the bird. The next account is that of Jean-François Charpentier de Cossigny in the mid-18th century.

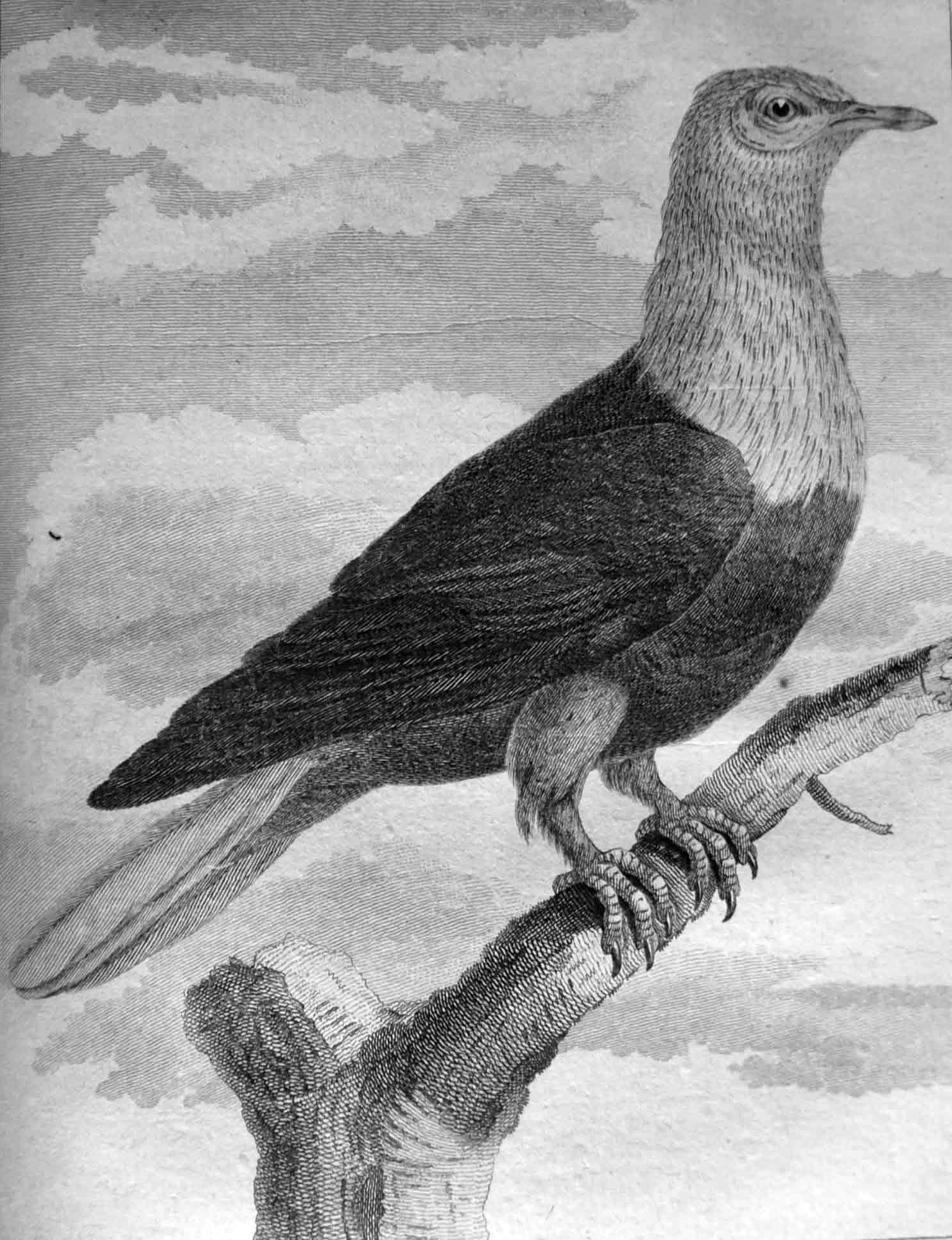
Illustration of a stuffed specimen published with Sonnerat's 1782 description

The French naturalist Pierre Sonnerat described the bird in 1782, calling it Pigeon Hollandais (Dutch pigeon), a French vernacular name that derives from its red, white, and blue colouration, reminiscent of the Dutch flag (the French flag did not have these colours before the 1789 revolution). He had collected two specimens during a voyage in 1774. These syntype specimens were deposited in the Muséum national d'Histoire naturelle in Paris. By 1893, only one of them, specimen MNHN n°C.G. 2000–727, still existed, and had been damaged by sulphuric acid in an attempt at fumigation. Since Sonnerat named and described them in French, the scientific naming of the bird was left to the Tyrolean naturalist Giovanni Antonio Scopoli, who did not observe a specimen himself, but Latinised Sonnerat's description in 1786. He named the bird Columba nitidissima, which means "most brilliant pigeon".

The German naturalist Johann Friedrich Gmelin described the bird with the species name franciae (referring to France) in 1789, and the French naturalist Pierre Joseph Bonnaterre used the name batavica (referring to Batavia) in his 1790 description. In 1840 the English zoologist George Robert Gray named a new genus, Alectroenas, for the Mauritius blue pigeon; alektruon in Greek means domestic cock, and oinas means dove. Alectroenas nitidissima is the type species of the genus, which includes all blue pigeons. The specific name was emended from A. nitidissimus to A. nitidissima by the IOC World Bird List in 2012.

Syntype specimen in Muséum national d'Histoire naturelle, Paris from multiple angles; the legs were erroneously painted red after the Madagascar blue pigeon

Another skin arrived at the Paris museum in 1800, collected by Colonel M. Mathieu for the French ornithologist Louis Dufresne. It was sold in 1819 among other items, was sent to Edinburgh, and is now in the National Museum of Scotland as specimen NMS Z.1819.1.1. It was not identified as a Mauritius blue pigeon until the British ornithologist Alfred Newton saw it in 1879. The last specimen recorded was shot in Savanne in 1826 and given to Julien Desjardins, founder of the Mauritius Natural History Museum in Port Louis, where it is still located, though in poor condition. Only these three taxidermic specimens still exist. Subfossil remains of the Mauritius blue pigeon were collected in the Mare aux Songes swamp by Théodore Sauzier in 1889. More were collected by Etienne Thirioux around 1900. They are thought to have been found near Le Pouce mountain and Plaine des Roches.

=== Evolution ===
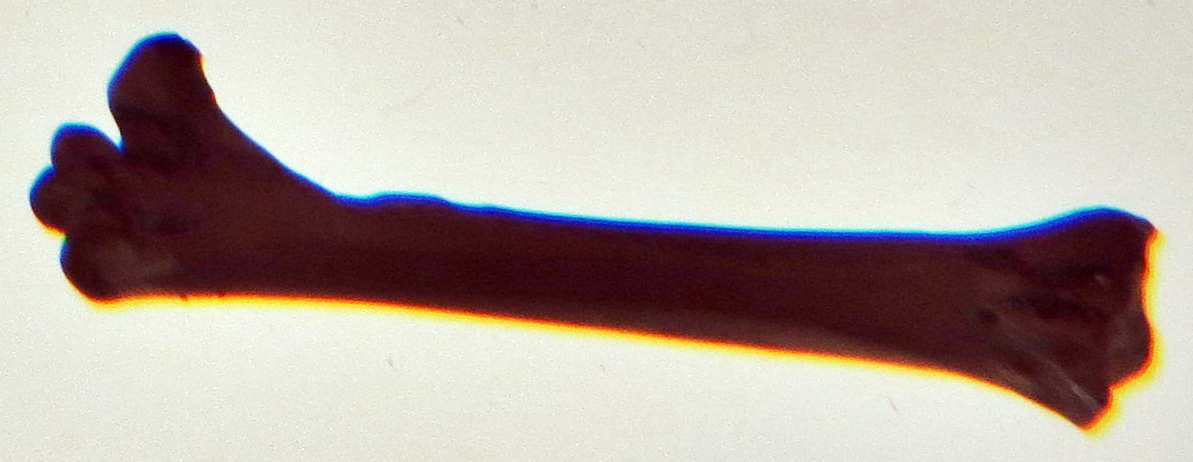
Subfossil tarsometatarsus leg-bone in Naturalis Biodiversity Center

Alectroenas blue pigeons are closely interrelated and occur widely throughout islands in the western Indian Ocean. They are allopatric and can therefore be regarded as a superspecies. There are three extant species: the Madagascar blue pigeon (A. madagascariensis), the Comoros blue pigeon (A. sganzini), and the Seychelles blue pigeon (A. pulcherrima). The three Mascarene islands were each home to a species, all of which are extinct: the Mauritius blue pigeon, the Rodrigues blue pigeon (A. payandeei), and the Réunion blue pigeon (A. sp.).

Compared with other pigeons, the blue pigeons are medium to large, stocky, and have longer wings and tails. All the species have distinct mobile hackles on the head and neck. The tibiotarsus is comparatively long and the tarsometatarsus short. The blue pigeons may have colonised the Mascarenes, the Seychelles or a now submerged hot spot island by "island hopping". They may have evolved into a distinct genus there before reaching Madagascar. Their closest genetic relative is the cloven-feathered dove of New Caledonia (Drepanoptila holosericea), from which they separated 8–9 million years ago. Their ancestral group appears to be the fruit doves (Ptilinopus) of Southeast Asia and Oceania.

=== Misidentified records ===
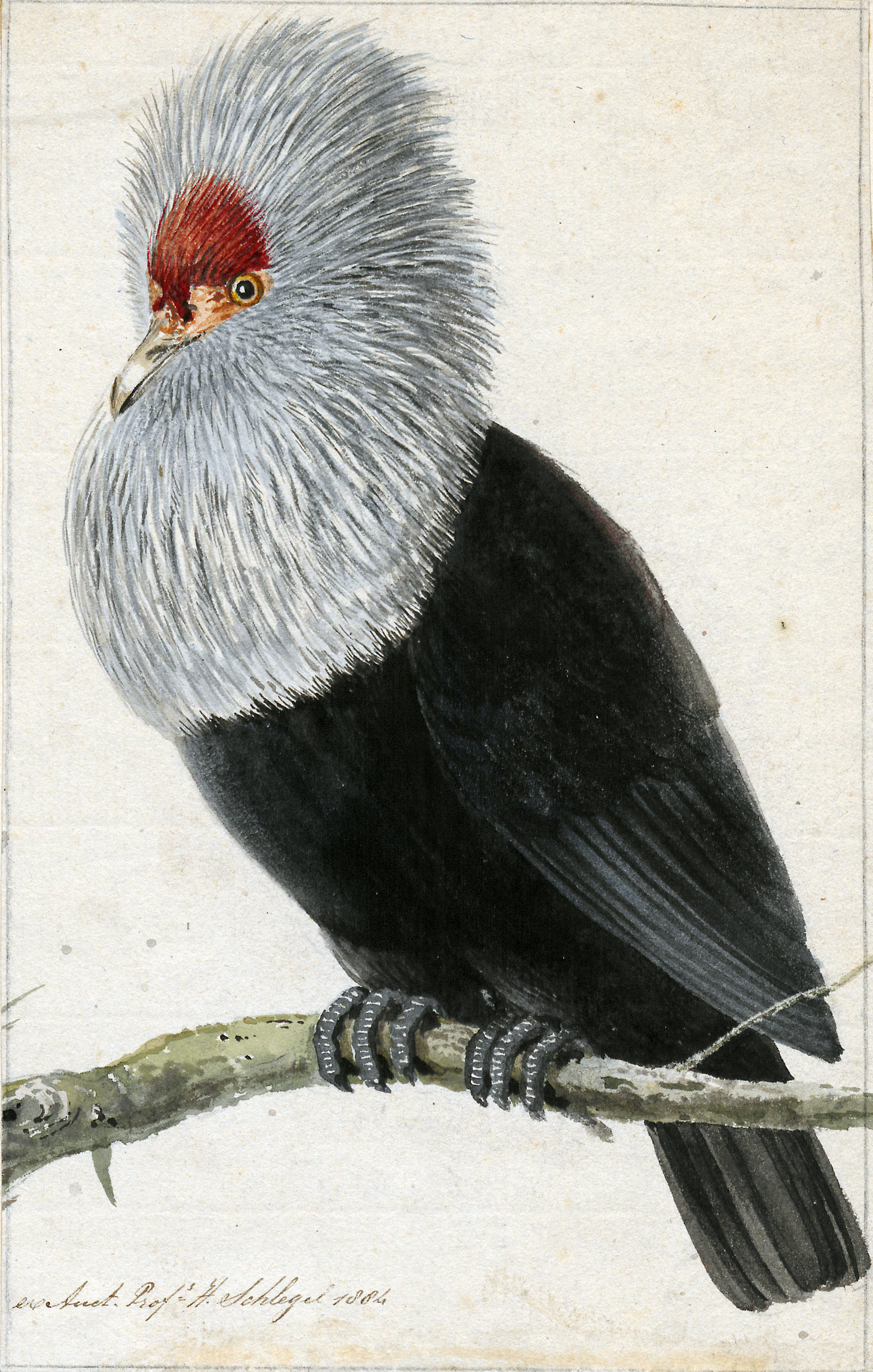
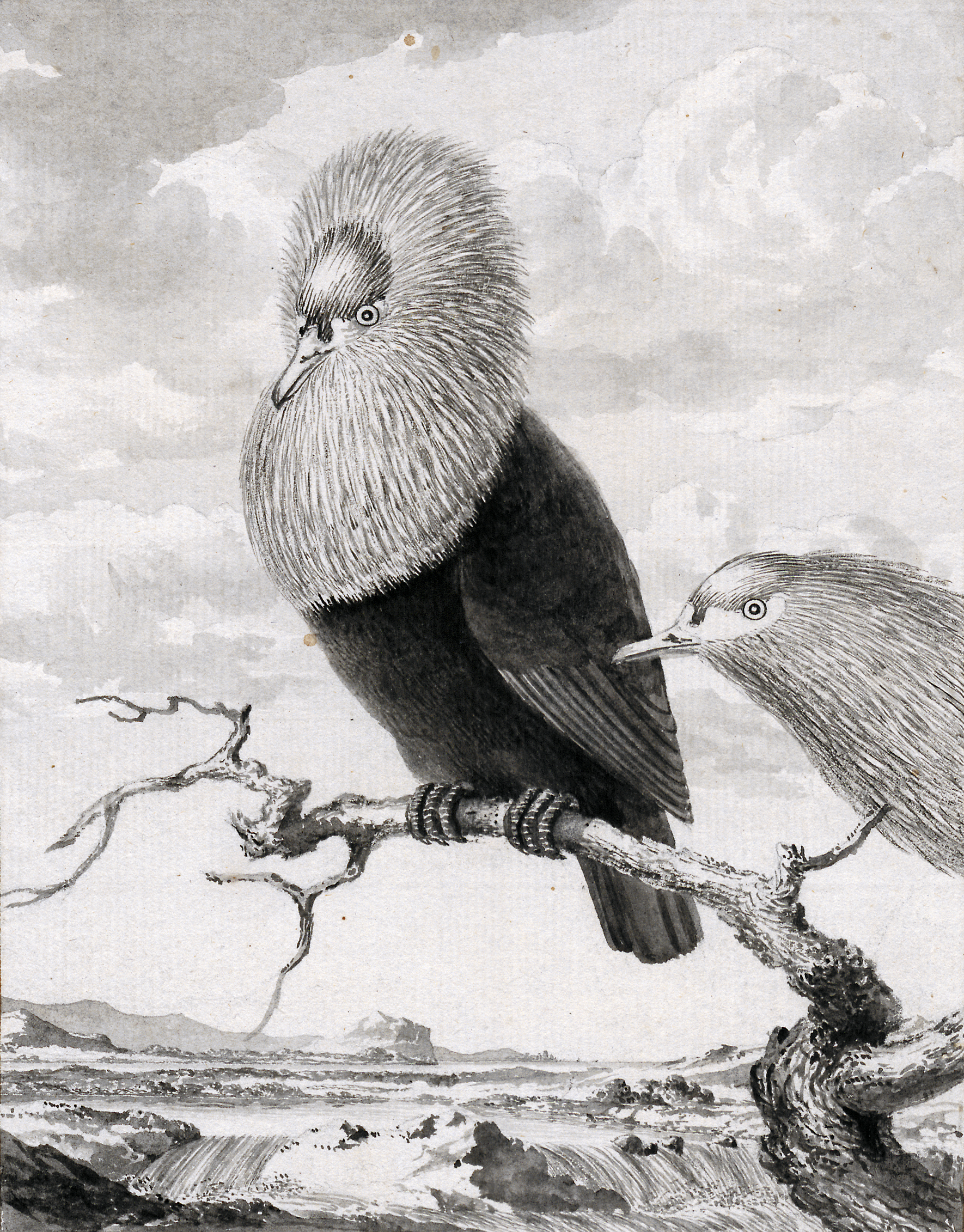
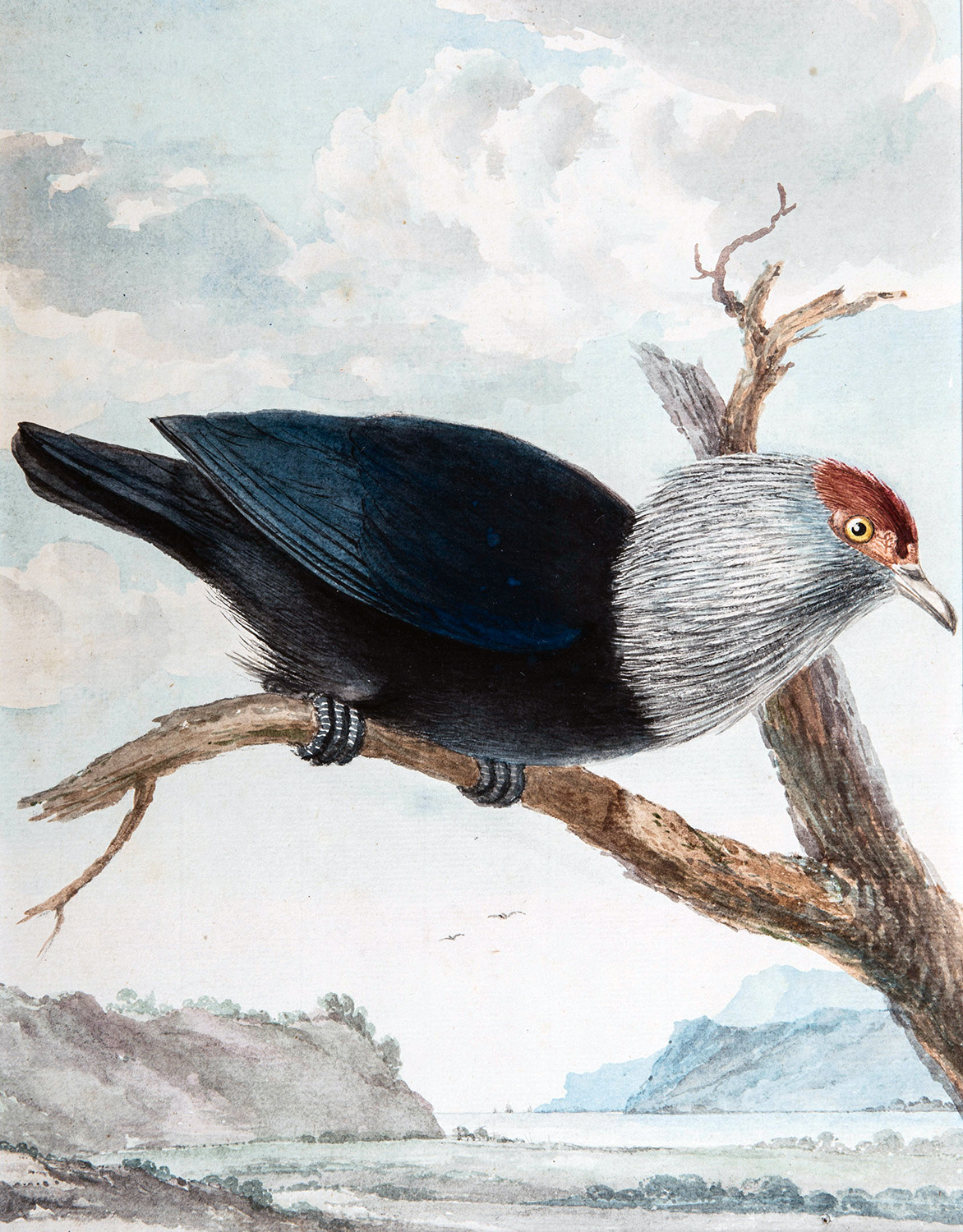
Life drawings long thought to depict a displaying Mauritius blue pigeon, but now believed to have been a Seychelles blue pigeon, by Gijsbertus Haasbroek, c. 1790

A blue pigeon recorded as being from Mauritius was brought to the Netherlands around 1790, where it survived in the menagerie of William V, Prince of Orange for three months before dying of oedema. The only known life drawings thought to show the species depict this individual; they were drawn by the Dutch artist Gijsbertus Haasbroek and first published by Piet Tuijn in 1969 (along with the Gelderland sketches). The illustrations show a displaying male raising its hackles into a ruff. This is a characteristic behaviour of other blue pigeons, too, and they can also vibrate their hackles. The director of the menagerie, Arnout Vosmaer, wrote a description of this individual on the back of the coloured drawing, stating it was called "Pavillons Hollandais", could turn its head-feathers upwards like a collar, and made calls sounding like "baf baf", as well as a cooing sound.

Unlike the three surviving skins of Mauritius blue pigeons, Haasbroek's illustration shows a red forehead. Both sexes of the Seychelles blue pigeon also have red foreheads, and the English palaeontologist Julian P. Hume suggested in 2011 that the image depicts a male, which was described as "infinitely more handsome" than the female by Cossigny in the mid-18th century. Hume therefore interpreted the three surviving skins as belonging to female specimens.

In 2020, the Dutch researcher and artist Ria Winters noted that the depicted bird was in fact a Seychelles blue pigeon. The British ecologist Anthony S. Cheke elaborated on this point in 2020 (after a third Haasbroek illustration of this individual resurfaced at an auction), and noted that because one of Haasbroek's paintings was originally published in monochrome in 1969, this may have misled later researchers, even when the coloured version resurfaced. Cheke found it perfectly clear that the colouration was consistent with a Seychelles blue pigeon, as its tail is dark blue instead of red, and the crown is red instead of white. Cheke also suggested that the name "Pavillons Hollandais" mentioned by Vosmaer was a corruption of pigeon hollandais, the name also used for the Mauritius blue pigeon, as both species have the red, white and blue colours similar to the Dutch flag. While Vosmaer's record of the bird coming from Mauritius was misleading, it may have been correct since it was probably shipped from the Seychelles via Mauritius, and would likely therefore have been reported as such (the Seychelles were a dependency of Mauritius at the time).

== Description ==
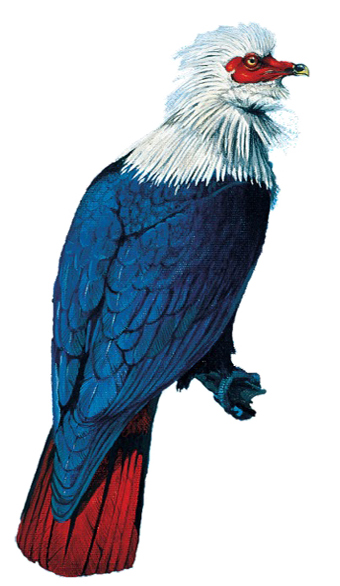
Life restoration by Julian P. Hume

The feathers on the head, neck and breast of the Mauritius blue pigeon were silvery white, long, stiffened and pointed, especially around the neck. A patch of bright red, naked skin surrounded the eyes, and extended across the cheeks to the beak, which was greenish with a dark tip. The plumage of the body was indigo, and the back, scapular feathers and wings were metallic blue. The bases of the outer rectrices were partially blackish blue. The tail feathers and tail coverts were maroon. The bill was greenish with a darker tip, and the legs were dark slate-grey. The iris was reddish orange and had an inner yellow ring.

The bird was 30 cm (12 in) in length, the wings were 208 mm (8.2 in), the tail was 132 mm (5.2 in), the culmen was 25 mm (1 in), and the tarsals were 28 mm (1.10 in). It was the largest and most robust member of its genus, and the hackles were longer and covered a larger area than in other blue pigeons. A Mauritian woman recalling observations of Mauritius blue pigeons around 1815 mentioned green as one of its colours. Juvenile Seychelles and Comoro blue pigeons have green feathers, so this may also have been the case for juvenile Mauritian pigeons.

Some depictions and descriptions have shown the legs of Mauritius blue pigeons as red, like those of the Madagascar blue pigeon. The legs of the Paris specimen were painted red when the original colour faded, presumably on the basis of such accounts. The legs of the two other surviving specimens have not been painted and have faded to a yellowish brown. Red legs were not mentioned in contemporary accounts, and such depictions are now thought to be erroneous. Some modern illustrations of the bird have also depicted it with facial crenulations, like those of the Seychelles blue pigeon. This feature was unknown from contemporary accounts, until the 1660s report of Johannes Pretorius about his stay on Mauritius was published in 2015, where he mentioned the bird's "warty face".

== Behaviour and ecology ==
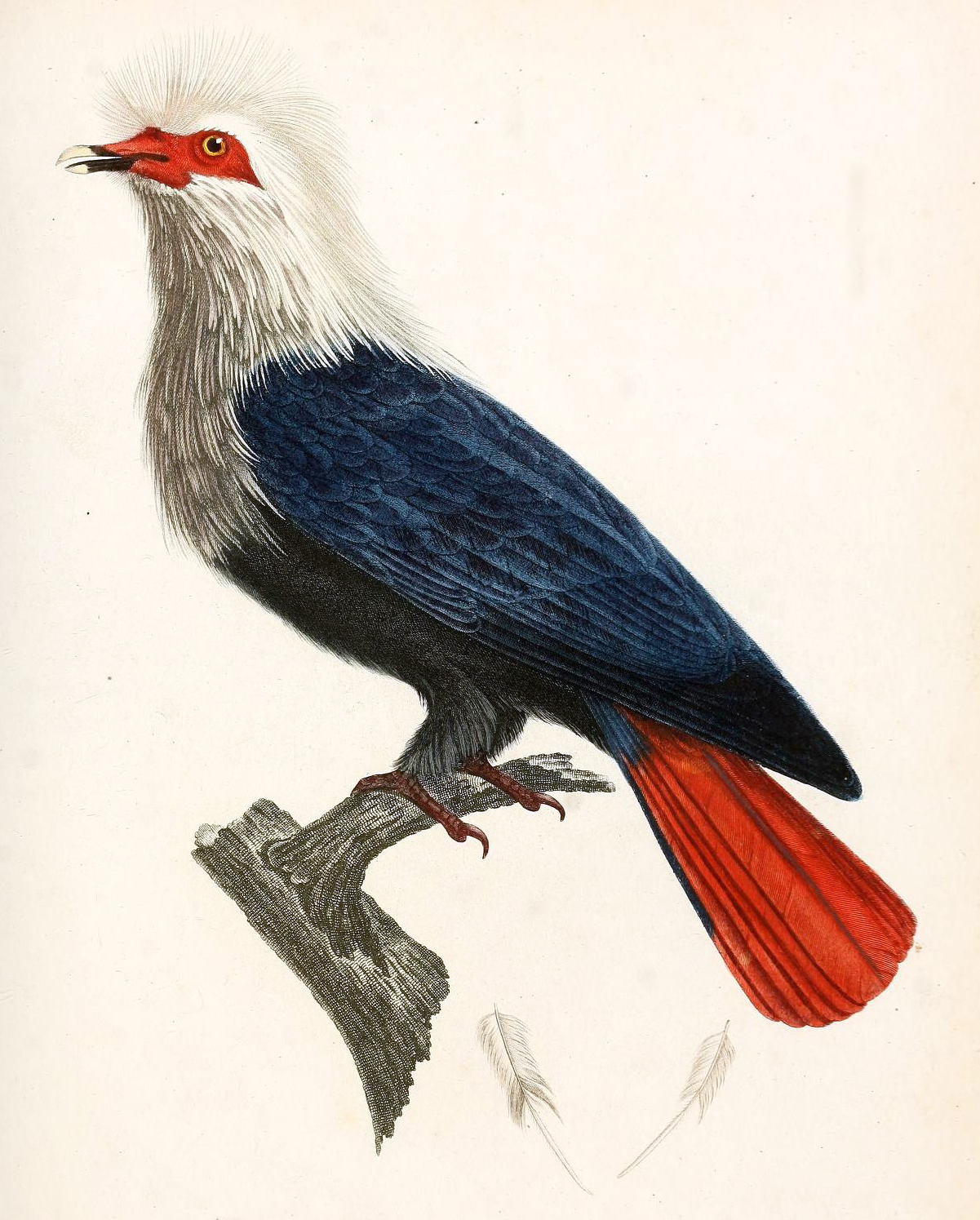
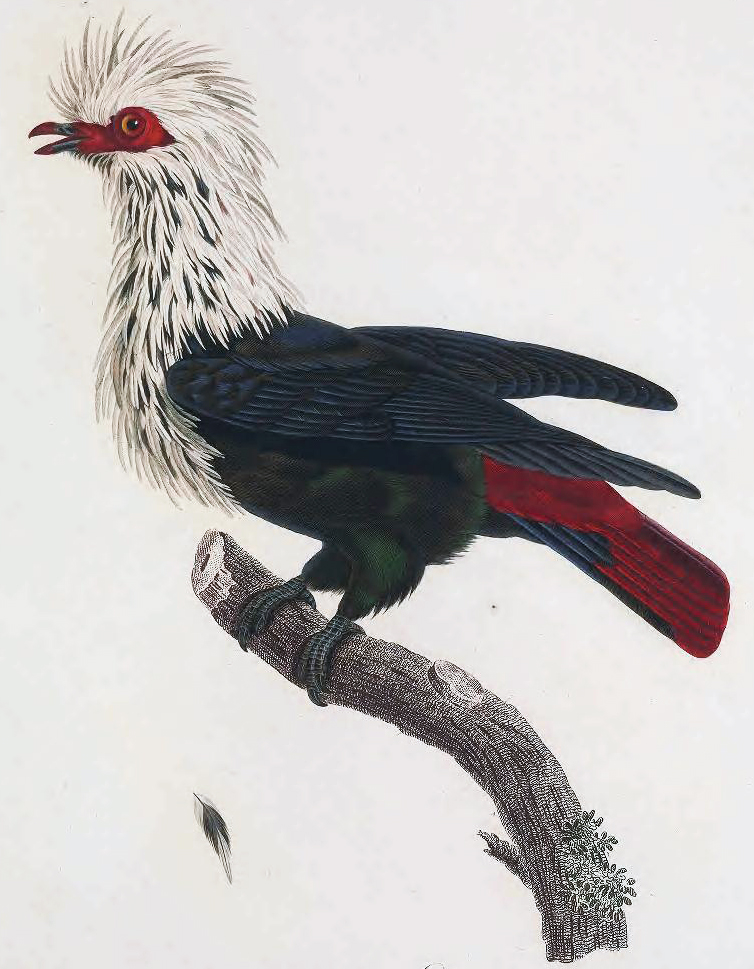
1808 illustration of the Paris specimen by J. Reinold with erroneous red legs, and 1811 illustration by Pauline Knip without red legs

Few descriptions of the behaviour of Mauritius blue pigeons are known; unpublished notes by Desjardins are now lost. The bird probably lived in pairs or small groups in humid, mountainous evergreen forests, like their extant relatives. Subfossil remains have been found in mid-west, mid-east and south-east Mauritius, indicating that the bird was once widespread. By 1812, the French naturalist Jacques Gérard Milbert stated that solitary individuals were found in river valleys. They probably became rarer during French rule in Mauritius (1715–1810), as lowland areas of the island were almost completely deforested during this time.

Many other endemic species of Mauritius became extinct after the arrival of humans, so the ecosystem of the island is severely damaged and hard to conserve. Before humans arrived, forests covered Mauritius entirely, but very little remains today because of deforestation. The surviving endemic fauna is still seriously threatened. The Mauritius blue pigeon lived alongside other recently extinct Mauritian birds such as the dodo, the red rail, the Mascarene grey parakeet, the broad-billed parrot, the Mauritius scops owl, the Mascarene coot, the Mauritian shelduck, the Mauritian duck and the Mauritius night heron. Extinct Mauritian reptiles include the saddle-backed Mauritius giant tortoise, the domed Mauritius giant tortoise, the Mauritian giant skink and the Round Island burrowing boa. The small Mauritian flying fox and the snail Tropidophora carinata lived on Mauritius and Réunion but became extinct in both islands. Some plants, such as Casearia tinifolia and the palm orchid, have also become extinct.

=== Diet ===
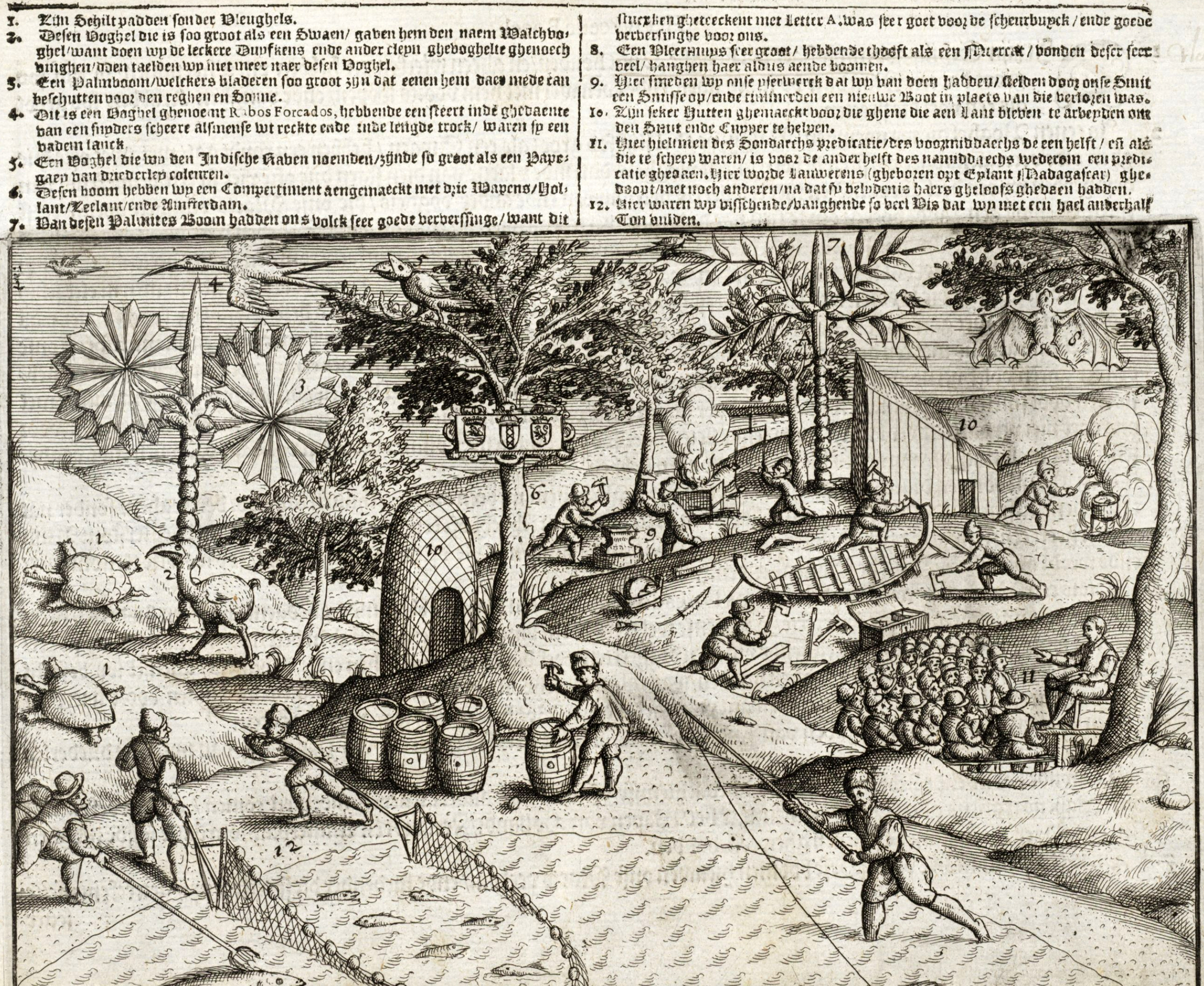
1601 engraving showing Dutch activities on the shore of Mauritius

Fruits and nuts were probably the mainstay of the Mauritius blue pigeon's diet, and like other blue pigeons, it may have occupied the upper canopy, and migrated seasonally to where food was available. Cossigny dissected a specimen in the mid-18th century and later sent it and its stomach contents to the French scientist René Antoine Ferchault de Réaumur with a letter describing his findings. The gizzard and crop contained four "nuts", which Cossigny was told were the seeds of either Calophyllum tacamahaca or Labourdonnaisia calophylloides. The Comoro and Seychelles blue pigeons also feed on C. tacamahaca, and the strong gizzard of the former helps in the digestion of the seeds. In 1812 Jacques Gérard Milbert provided the only description of the behaviour of the bird in the wild:

The second is the pigeon with a mane; the inhabitants of the Ile de France [Mauritius] call it pigeon hollandais; the head, neck and chest are adorned with long pointed white feathers which it can raise at will; the rest of the body, and the wings, are a fine deep violet; the end of the tail is a purplish red. It is one of the finest species of its kind ... The second of these birds lives solitary in river valleys, where I have often seen it without being able to secure one. It eats fruit and fresh water molluscs.

The claim that the bird fed on river molluscs was criticised by the French zoologists Alphonse Milne-Edwards and Emile Oustalet in 1893, with the later agreement of the American ornithologist James Greenway in 1967, as blue pigeons are principally arboreal. It has since been pointed out that other mainly frugivorous pigeons, such as species of Ptilinopus and Gallicolumba, do occasionally eat molluscs and other invertebrates. The two species of Nesoenas have also been reported as eating freshwater snails, and one was seen hunting tadpoles. Milbert may in any case have been referring to arboreal snails, as extant blue pigeons rarely land on the ground. A diet of snails would have provided the birds with calcium for egg production. Pretorius attempted to keep juvenile and adult Mauritius blue pigeons in captivity, but all his specimens died. This is probably because the species was almost exclusively frugivorous, like extant blue pigeons.

== Extinction ==
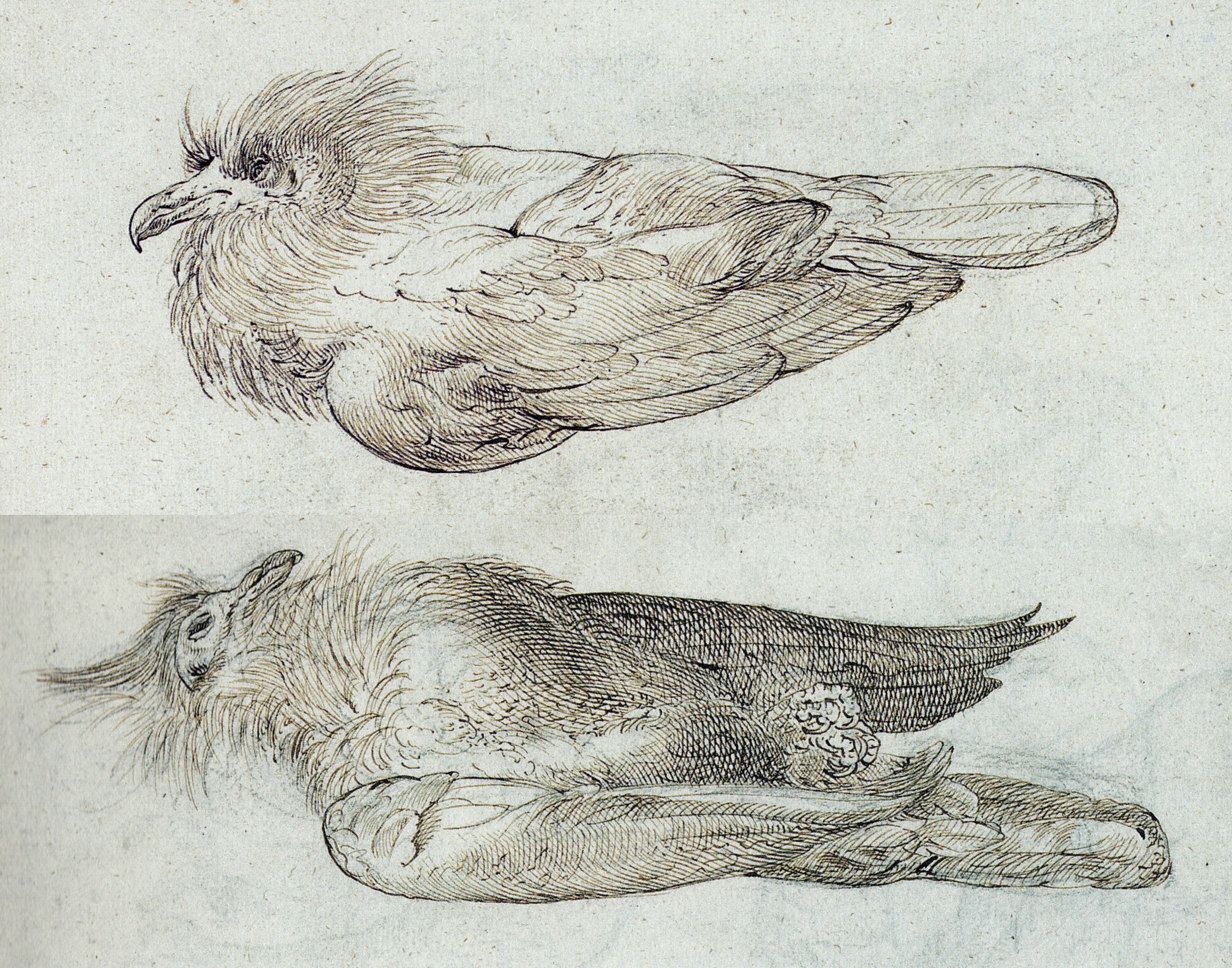
Sketches in the Gelderland ship's journal showing recently killed or stunned birds on Mauritius, by Joris Joostensz Laerle, 1601

The Mauritius blue pigeon coexisted with humans for 200 years. Its decline can be correlated with deforestation, which is also the main threat to extant blue pigeons. Little lowland forest was left on the island by 1859. Frugivorous birds often need a large area for foraging and move between forest types to feed on different types of food, which grow irregularly. Other blue pigeons perch on bare branches, making them vulnerable to hunters.

Cossigny noted that the bird had become rare by 1755, but were common 23 years before, and attributed the decline to deforestation and hunting by escaped slaves. On the other hand, Bonnaterre stated they were still common in 1790. The Mauritius blue pigeon was not seasonally poisonous like the pink pigeon, which still survives on Mauritius today, but it was reputed to be. In spite of this, it was hunted for food, and some early accounts praised the flavour of the bird. Extant blue pigeons are also considered good food, and are heavily hunted as a result, and it appears another population of them was hunted to extinction from the Farquhar and Providence islands. The Mauritius blue pigeon was easy to catch due to island tameness.

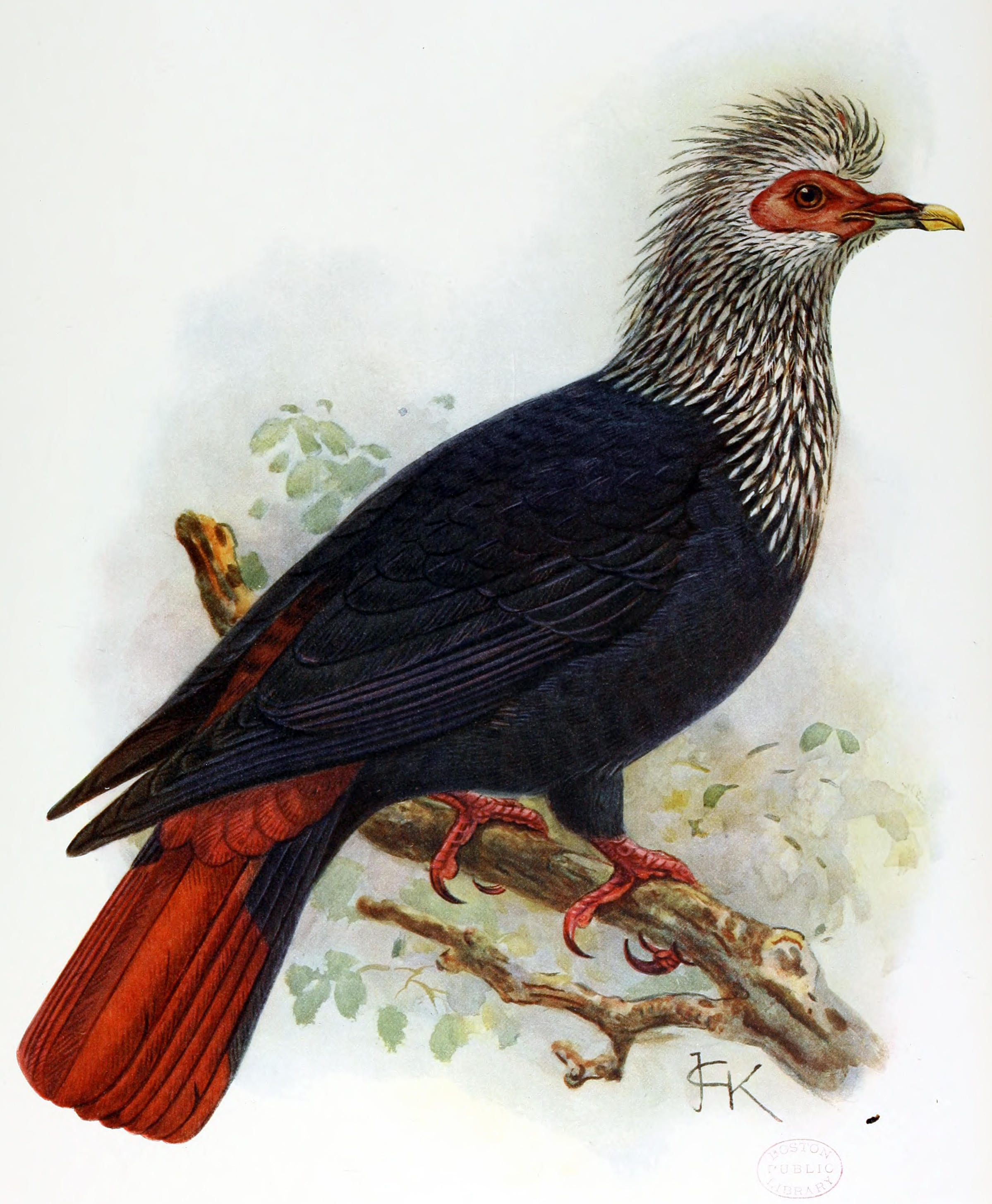
Illustration of the Paris specimen by John Gerrard Keulemans from 1907

The last confirmed specimen was shot in the Savanne district in 1826, but the 1832 report by Desjardins suggests that some could still be found in remote forests in the centre of the island. Convinced that the pigeon still survived, the British ornithologist Edward Newton interviewed two inhabitants of Mauritius about the Mauritius blue pigeon in 1863, and these accounts suggest that the bird survived until at least 1837. The first interviewee claimed he had killed two specimens when the British Colonel James Simpson stayed on the island, which was 1826–1837. The second was a woman who had last seen a bird around this time, and recalled hunts of it in approximately 1815, in a swampy area near Black River Gorges, south western Mauritius:

When she was a girl and used to go into the forest with her father de Chazal, she has seen quantities of Pigeon Hollandais and Merles [Hypsipetes olivaceus], both species were so tame they might be knocked down with sticks, & her father used to kill more that way than by shooting them, as she was a nervous child. Her father always warned her before he fired, but she would entreat him to knock the bird down with his stick & not to shoot it – she said the last Pigeon Hollandais she saw was about 27 years ago just after she married poor old Moon, it was brought out of the forest by a marron. She said it was larger than a tame pigeon & was all the colours of the rainbow, particularly about the head, red, green & blue.

It can be concluded that the Mauritius blue pigeon became extinct in the 1830s. Apart from habitat destruction and hunting, introduced predators, mainly crab-eating macaques, were probably also responsible.
