= Providence blue pigeon =

Conservation status
- Extinct (1880s)

Scientific classification
- Kingdom: Animalia
- Phylum: Chordata
- Class: Aves
- Order: Columbiformes
- Family: Columbidae
- Tribe: Ptilinopodini
- Genus: Alectroenas
- Species: †A. sp.

Binomial name
- †Alectroenas sp.

Extinct species of bird

The Providence blue pigeon (Alectroenas sp.), also known as the Farquhar Islands blue pigeon or small blue pigeon, is an extinct species of bird that lived on Farquhar, Providence, and St. Pierre in the Seychelles.

== Description ==
The Providence blue pigeon was a species of blue pigeon that most likely looked very similar to the Seychelles blue pigeon. It may even have been the same species as the Seychelles blue pigeon, although it is possible that it was a distinct species. It nested on Mapou trees and other similar trees. In 1821–1822 it was said that they were in great abundance in Farquhar. They were known to be incredibly tame, and nearly impossible to disturb.

== History ==
In an excerpt from a document from Fairfax Moresby, he mentions "small blue pigeons", of which today none are known to inhabit the island.

A document about voyages in the southwest Indian Ocean in 1821–22, written by Captain Fairfax Moresby:

"Jean de Nova i.e. Farquhar and Providence ... like the Amirantes, Coetivy and Alphonse are the resort of Millions of Birds of which, the Frigate Bird, the Fou, a beautiful small white gull, a variety of various coloured Gannet, and the Tropic Bird are the principle: In S. Pierre and Providence a species of small blue pigeon are in great abundance, and so seldom disturbed that they do not fly at Man's approach, but are knock'd down with Sticks, we found them excessively good eating, these birds build and nest on the Mapou tree and other Dwarf trees which cover the surface of the islands..."

In 1968, David Stoddart surveyed Farquhar but did not sight any blue pigeon species. It is unknown what drove them to extinction.
