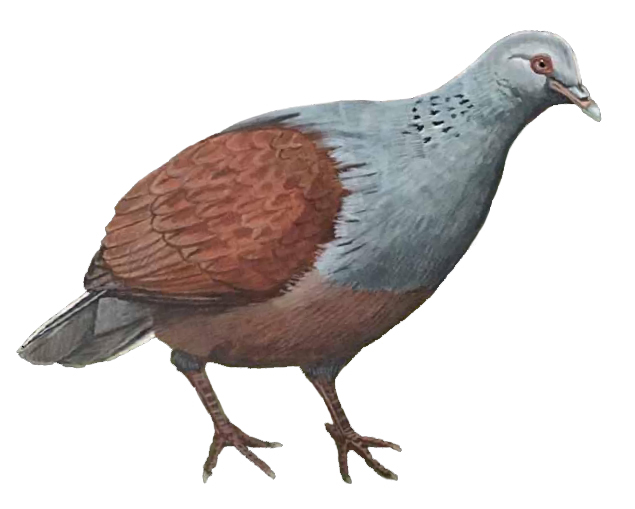
- Life restoration by Julian P. Hume

Conservation status
- Extinct (1730s) (IUCN 3.1)

Scientific classification
- Kingdom: Animalia
- Phylum: Chordata
- Class: Aves
- Order: Columbiformes
- Family: Columbidae
- Genus: Nesoenas
- Species: †N. cicur

Binomial name
- †Nesoenas cicur (Hume, 2011)
- Former range

= Mauritian turtle dove =

Extinct species of bird

The Mauritian turtle dove (Nesoenas cicur) is an extinct species of the pigeon genus Nesoenas which was endemic to Mauritius. The holotype is a right tarsometatarsus collected in 2008 in southeastern Mauritius. It became extinct around 1730 because of overhunting, predation by introduced rats, and the deforestation of the island.
