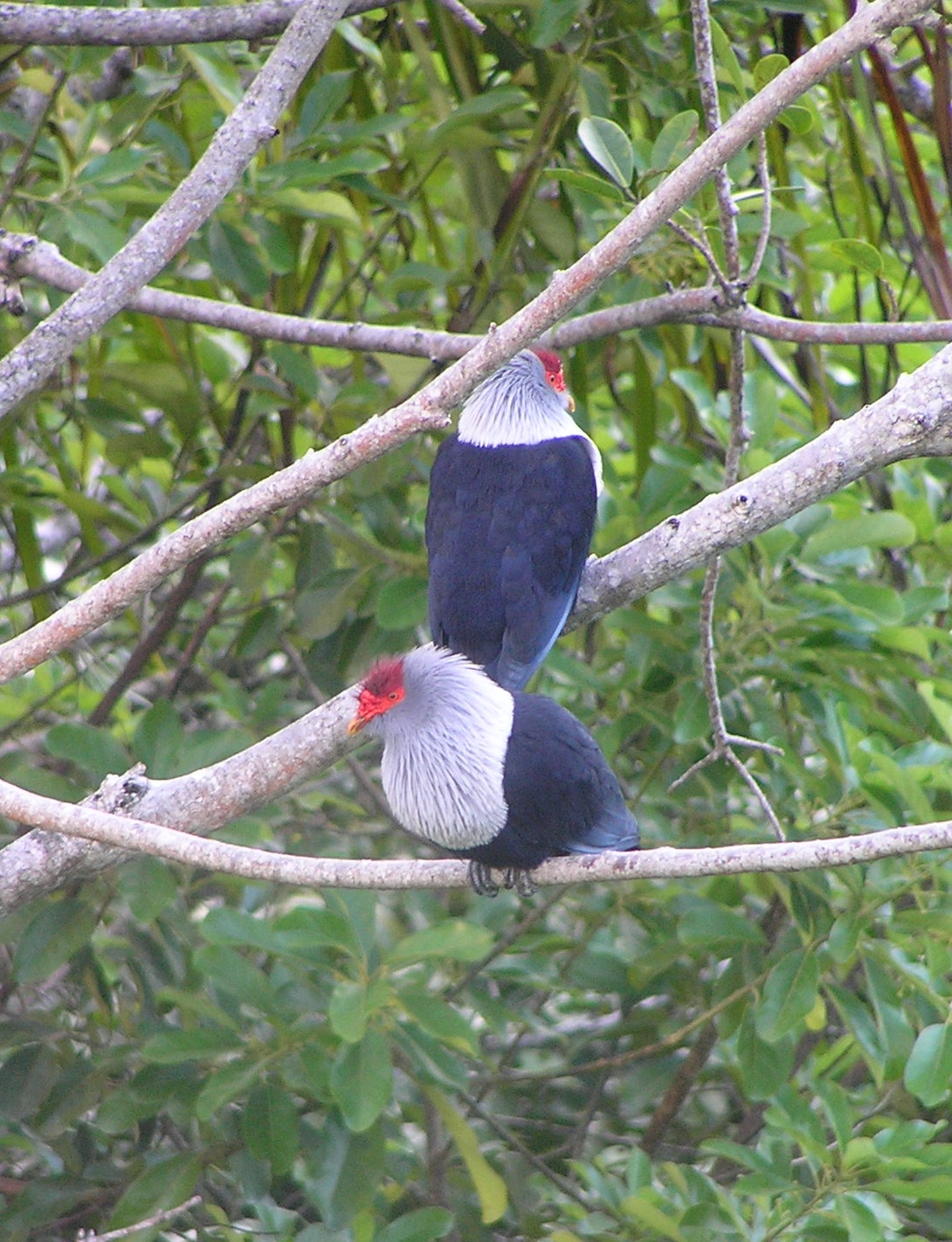
- Seychelles blue pigeon

Scientific classification
- Kingdom: Animalia
- Phylum: Chordata
- Class: Aves
- Order: Columbiformes
- Family: Columbidae
- Tribe: Ptilinopodini
- Genus: Alectroenas; G.R. Gray, 1840

Type species
- † Columba nitidissima Scopoli, 1786

Species
- see text

= Blue pigeon =

Genus of birds

The blue pigeons are a genus, Alectroenas, of birds in the dove and pigeon family Columbidae. They are native to islands in the western Indian Ocean.

== Taxonomy and evolution ==
The genus Alectroenas was first described in 1840 by the English zoologist George Robert Gray with the Mauritius blue pigeon (Alectroenas nitidissimus) as the type species. The genus name combines the Ancient Greek alektruōn, meaning "domestic cock", and oinas, meaning "pigeon".

The Alectroenas blue pigeons are closely interrelated and occur widely throughout islands in the western Indian Ocean. They are allopatric and can therefore be regarded as a superspecies. There are three extant species: the Madagascar blue pigeon, the Comoros blue pigeon, and the Seychelles blue pigeon. The three Mascarene islands were home to one species each, which are all extinct; the Mauritius blue pigeon, the Rodrigues blue pigeon, and the Réunion blue pigeon. The blue pigeons perhaps colonised the Mascarenes, the Seychelles or a now submerged hot spot island by "island hopping" and evolved into a distinct genus there before reaching Madagascar. Their closest genetic relative is the cloven-feathered dove, Drepanoptila holosericea, of New Caledonia, which they separated from 8–9 million years ago. Their ancestral group appears to be the fruit doves (Ptilinopus) of Southeast Asia and Oceania.

The genus contains five extant or recently extinct species:

- † Mauritius blue pigeon (Alectroenas nitidissimus) extinct
- Madagascar blue pigeon (Alectroenas madagascariensis)
- Comoros blue pigeon (Alectroenas sganzini)
- Seychelles blue pigeon (Alectroenas pulcherrimus)
- † Providence blue pigeon (Alectroenas sp.) extinct

=== Species possibly in the genus ===
Two species that became extinct in prehistoric times may have belonged to this genus:

- † Rodrigues blue pigeon (Alectroenas payandeei)
- † Réunion blue pigeon (Alectroenas sp.)

The Rodrigues pigeon (Nesoenas rodericana), now extinct, was once assigned to the genus Alectroenas, but this is now believed to be erroneous. In reality, it probably belongs to an undescribed genus, as the sternum's shape is very dissimilar in its details to that of Alectroenas or Columba, and indeed to any other living genus of pigeons and doves. It is most similar to that of the Gallicolumba ground doves or to a miniature version of the sternum of a Ducula imperial pigeon.

The Réunion blue pigeon is known from the description of a slaty-blue feathered pigeon on Réunion, given by Dubois in 1674.

Dubois' description is as follows:

"...wild pigeons, everywhere full with them, some with slaty-coloured feathering, the others russet-red. They are a little larger than the European pigeons, and have larger bills, red at the end close to the head, the eyes ringed with the colour of fire, like pheasants. There is a season when they are so fat that one can no longer see their cloaca. They are very good tasting. Wood-pigeons and turtle-doves, as one sees in Europe and as good."

Dubois mentions "wild pigeons, everywhere full with them, some with slaty-coloured feathering" which likely references the Réunion blue pigeon. Since the Réunion blue pigeon was only mentioned by Dubois, little is known about its extinction. The Réunion blue pigeon likely survived after 1683 and maybe even until 1703. Jean Feuilley mentioned that all native pigeons were extinct in 1705. It is possible that invasive species such as cats and rats could have caused their extinction.

== Description ==
Compared to other pigeons, the blue pigeons are medium to large, stocky, and have comparatively long wings and tails. They all have distinct mobile hackles on the head and neck. The tibiotarsus is comparatively long and the tarsometatarsus is short.
