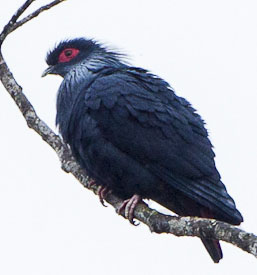

Conservation status
- Near Threatened (IUCN 3.1)

Scientific classification
- Kingdom: Animalia
- Phylum: Chordata
- Class: Aves
- Order: Columbiformes
- Family: Columbidae
- Genus: Alectroenas
- Species: A. madagascariensis

Binomial name
- Alectroenas madagascariensis (Linnaeus, 1766)

Synonyms
- Columba madagascariensis Linnaeus, 1766

= Madagascar blue pigeon =

Species of bird

The Madagascar blue pigeon or Madagascan blue pigeon (Alectroenas madagascariensis) is a species of bird in the family Columbidae. The species is closely related to the other two extant species of blue pigeon, the Comoros blue pigeon and the Seychelles blue pigeon. It is endemic to northern and eastern Madagascar.

== Taxonomy ==
In 1760 the French zoologist Mathurin Jacques Brisson included a description of the Madagascar blue pigeon in his six volume Ornithologie. He used the French name Le pigeon ramier bleu de Madagascar and the Latin Palumbus coeruleus madagascariensis. Although Brisson coined Latin names, these do not conform to the binomial system and are not recognised by the International Commission on Zoological Nomenclature. When in 1766 the Swedish naturalist Carl Linnaeus updated his Systema Naturae for the twelfth edition, he added 240 species that had been previously described by Brisson. One of these was the Madagascar blue pigeon which he placed with all the other pigeons in the genus Columba. Linnaeus included a brief description, coined the binomial name Columba madagascariensis and cited Brisson's work. This pigeon is now placed in the genus Alectroenas that was introduced in 1840 by the English zoologist George Robert Gray. The species is monotypic: no subspecies are recognised.

== Distribution and habitat ==
Its natural habitats are tropical moist lowland forests and subtropical or tropical moist montane forests, both undisturbed and degraded, from sea-level to 2,000 m (6,600 ft). Within this habitat they are often observed from the tree tops and on branches above the canopy. The species is apparently partially migratory, leaving the northern part of the island for part of the year and moving west during the rainy season. More research is needed to understand this behaviour.

== Description ==
The Madagascar blue pigeon is 25 to 27 cm (9.8–10.6 in) long. The plumage of this species is dominated by shades of blue, as the name suggests; the neck and throat are silvery blue-grey and the plumes are filamentous, the upper parts are silvery-grey, and the breast blue-grey going to deep blue on the belly. The tail is deep red, and the head is blue with a large red patch of bare skin around the yellow eye. The feet are red and the small bill is greenish with a yellow tip.

== Behaviour and ecology ==
Little is known about its behaviour. It has been observed feeding on fruit, either in pairs or in small groups of up to 12 birds. The nests are simple platforms of twigs placed 6–20 m (20–66 ft) up a tree, and the clutch size is a single egg.
