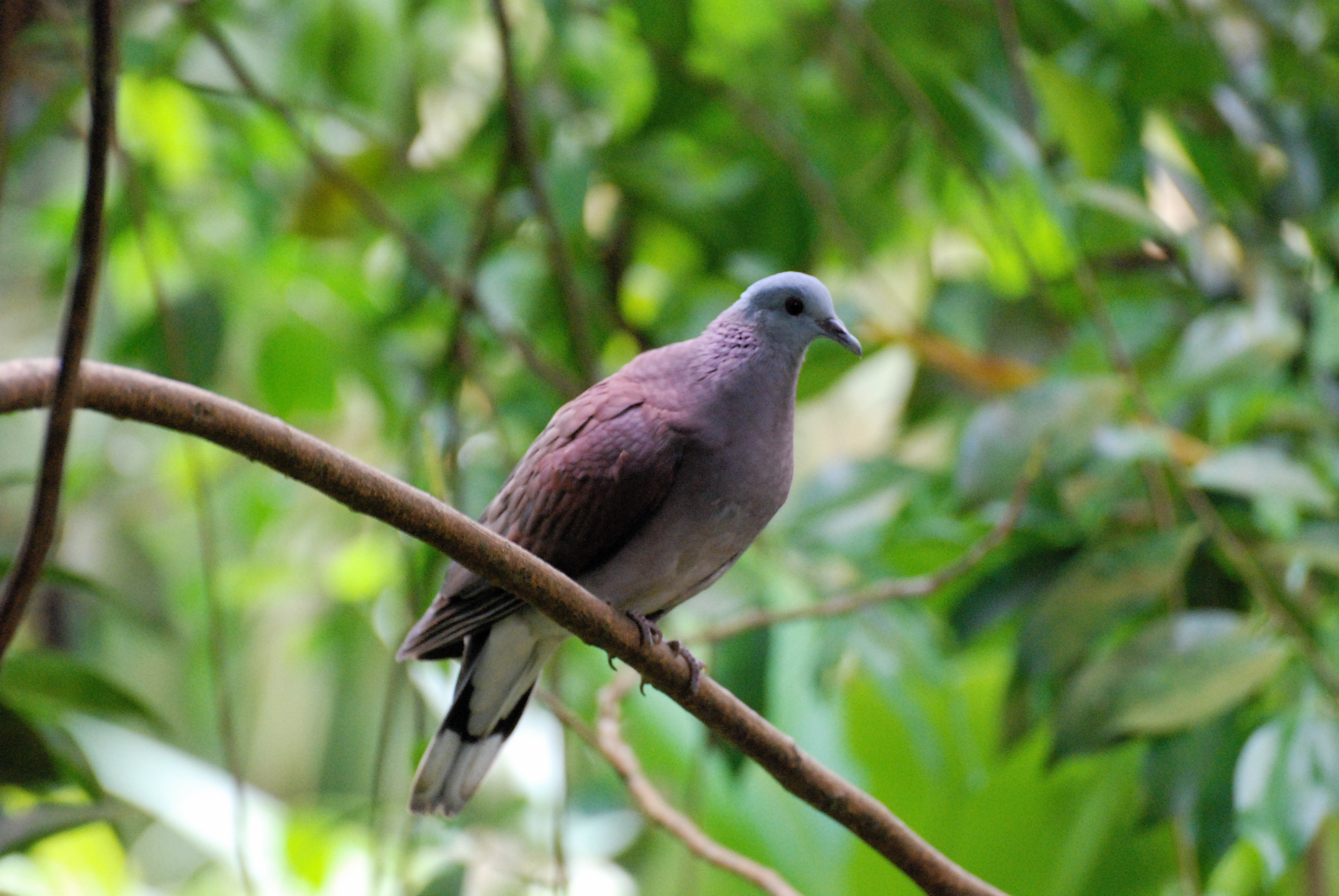
- Malagasy turtle dove (N. picturata) at Zürich Zoo (Switzerland)

Scientific classification
- Kingdom: Animalia
- Phylum: Chordata
- Class: Aves
- Order: Columbiformes
- Family: Columbidae
- Tribe: Columbini
- Genus: Nesoenas; Salvadori, 1893

Synonyms
- Homopelia Salvadori, 1893

= Nesoenas =

Genus of birds

Nesoenas is a bird genus in the pigeon and dove family, Columbidae. It is often included with the typical turtle-doves in Streptopelia or the typical pigeons (Columba). By those who accepted it, it was usually treated as monotypic, containing only the pink pigeon (N. mayeri) of Mauritius.

Recent cladistic analysis of mtDNA cytochrome b, cytochrome c oxidase subunit I and NADH dehydrogenase subunit 2, as well as nuclear β-fibrinogen intron 7 sequence data, combined with a distinct morphology and behaviour, suggest that the genus is valid but not monotypic. Nesoenas should actually refer to the apparently monophyletic lineage of Columbidae from the Madagascar–Mascarenes region. Though most closely related to both Streptopelia and Columba, it cannot be unequivocally be considered a basal branch of either.

Separating from its relatives in Columba and Streptopelia probably in the Late Miocene, perhaps some 8–7 million years ago, this lineage has characteristic vocalizations, and a generally reddish-hued plumage with a darker back and lighter underparts and head. At least in the living species, the rump and tail are colored contrastingly. The living species differ much in size, and the pink pigeon (and presumably its extinct Réunion relative too) is notably large and apomorphic compared to the rather plesiomorphic but widespread Malagasy turtle dove (N. picturata). But even though the latter species has display plumage on the neck similar to that of several Columba and Streptopelia, these feathers have somewhat bifurcated tips, unlike in the two related genera. Theoretically, the smaller lineage could be separated as Homopelia, but most modern authors would probably consider this oversplitting.

== Species ==
The genus contains three species, of which one is now extinct:

Genus Nesoenas – Salvadori, 1893 – three species
Common name	Scientific name and subspecies	Range	Size and ecology	IUCN status and estimated population
Malagasy turtle dove or Malagasy turtle-dove	Nesoenas picturatus (Temminck, 1813) Five subspecies: N. p. aldabranus; N. p. comorensis; N. p. coppingeri; N. p. picturatus; N. p. rostratus	the Comoros, Madagascar, Mauritius, Mayotte, Réunion, Chagos archipelago and the Seychelles.	Size: Habitat: Diet:	LC
† Rodrigues pigeon, extinct (before 1690?)	Nesoenas rodericanus (Milne-Edwards, 1873)	Mascarene island of Rodrigues.	Size: Habitat: Diet:	EX
Pink pigeon	Nesoenas mayeri (Prévost, 1843) Two subspecies: N. m. mayeri; † N. m. duboisi	Mauritius	Size: Habitat: Diet:	VU

Another extinct species may belong to this genus:

Common name	Scientific name and subspecies	Range	IUCN status and estimated population
† Mauritian turtle dove	Nesoenas cicur (Hume, 2011)	Mauritius	EX
