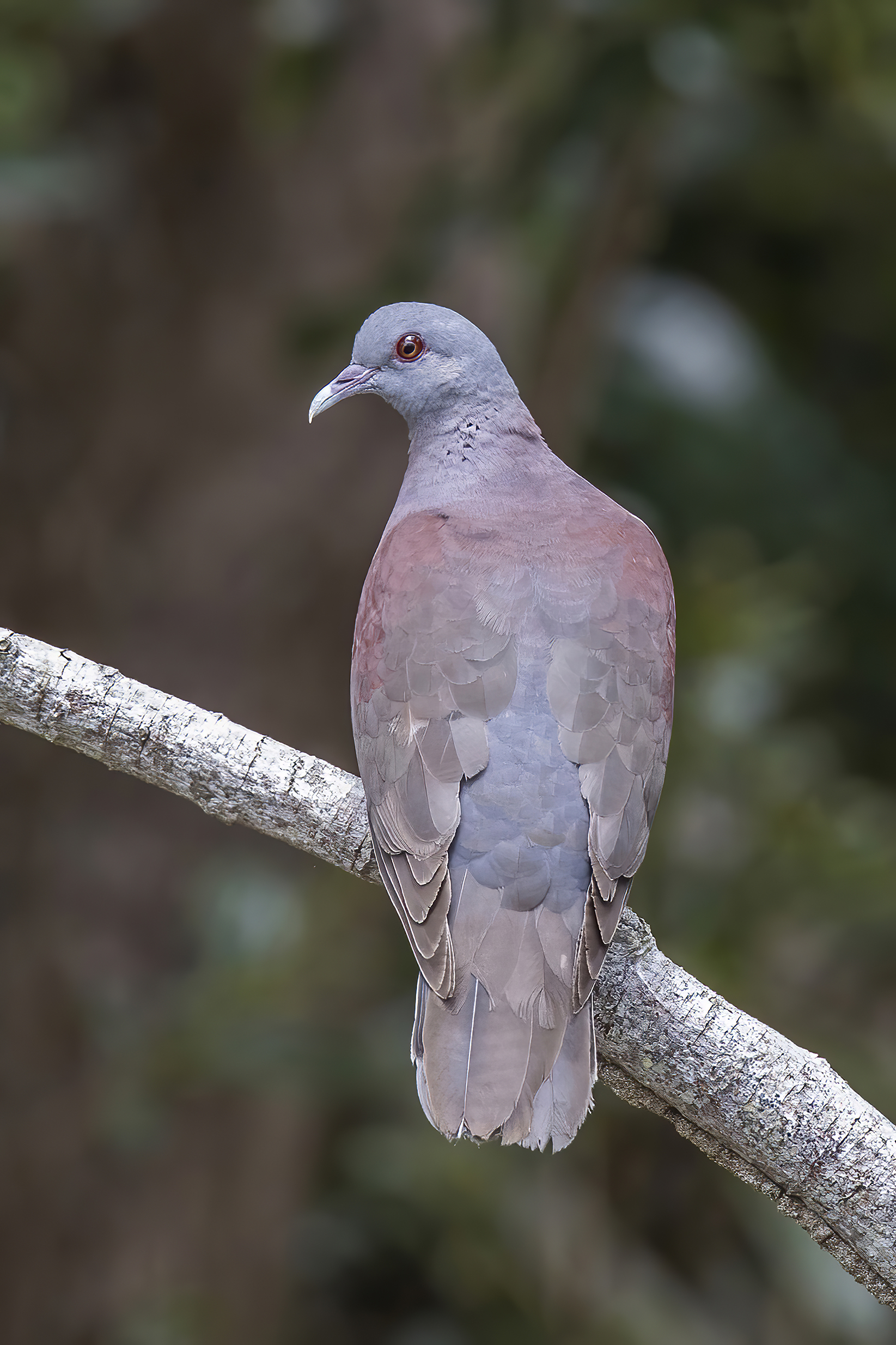

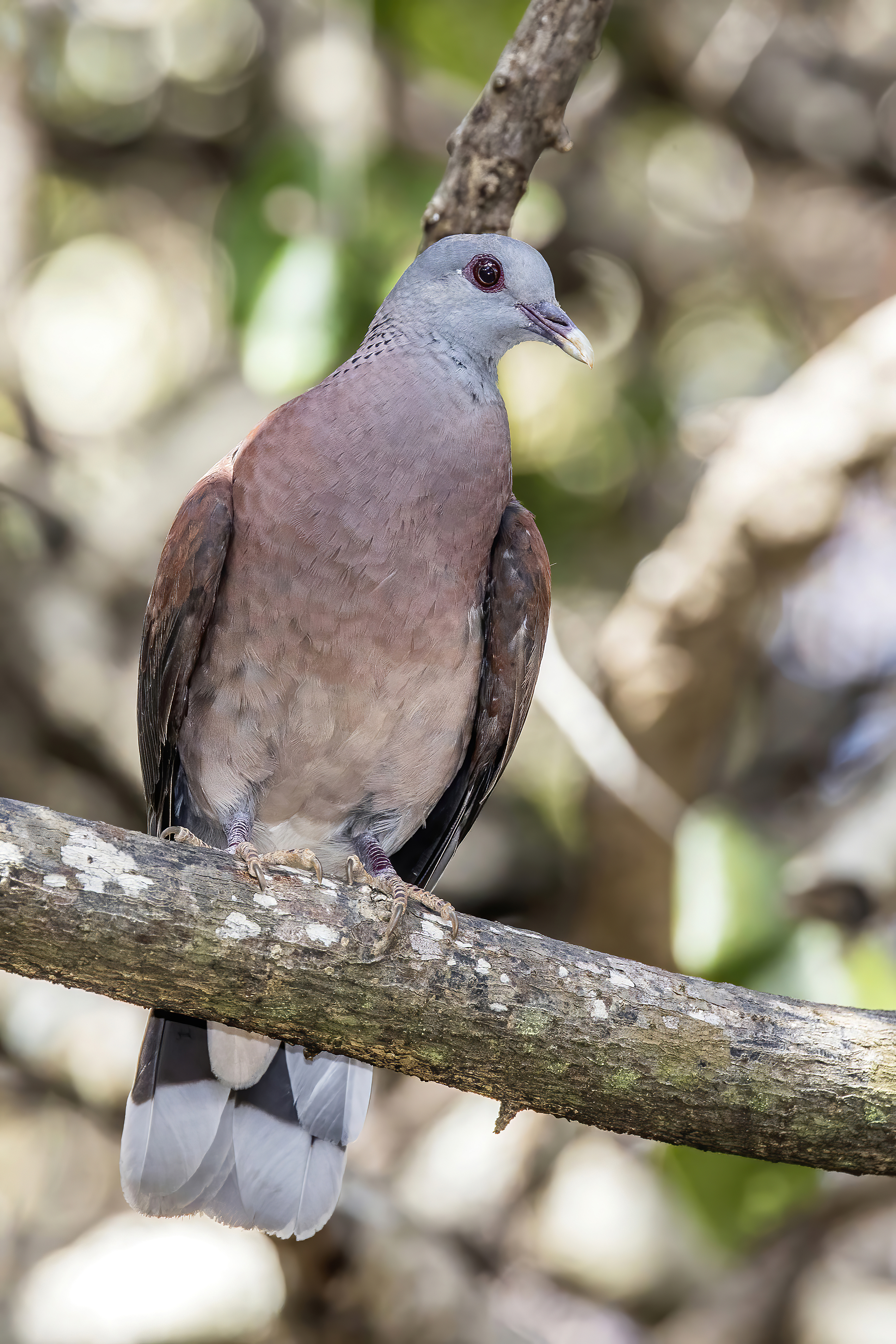
- both in Mauritius

Conservation status
- Least Concern (IUCN 3.1)

Scientific classification
- Kingdom: Animalia
- Phylum: Chordata
- Class: Aves
- Order: Columbiformes
- Family: Columbidae
- Genus: Nesoenas
- Species: N. picturatus

Binomial name
- Nesoenas picturatus (Temminck, 1813)

Synonyms
- Columba picturata (Temminck, 1813); Homopelia picturata (Temminck, 1813); Streptopelia picturata Temminck, 1813

= Malagasy turtle dove =

Species of bird

The Malagasy turtle dove or Madagascar turtle dove (Nesoenas picturatus) is a bird species in the pigeon and dove family, Columbidae.

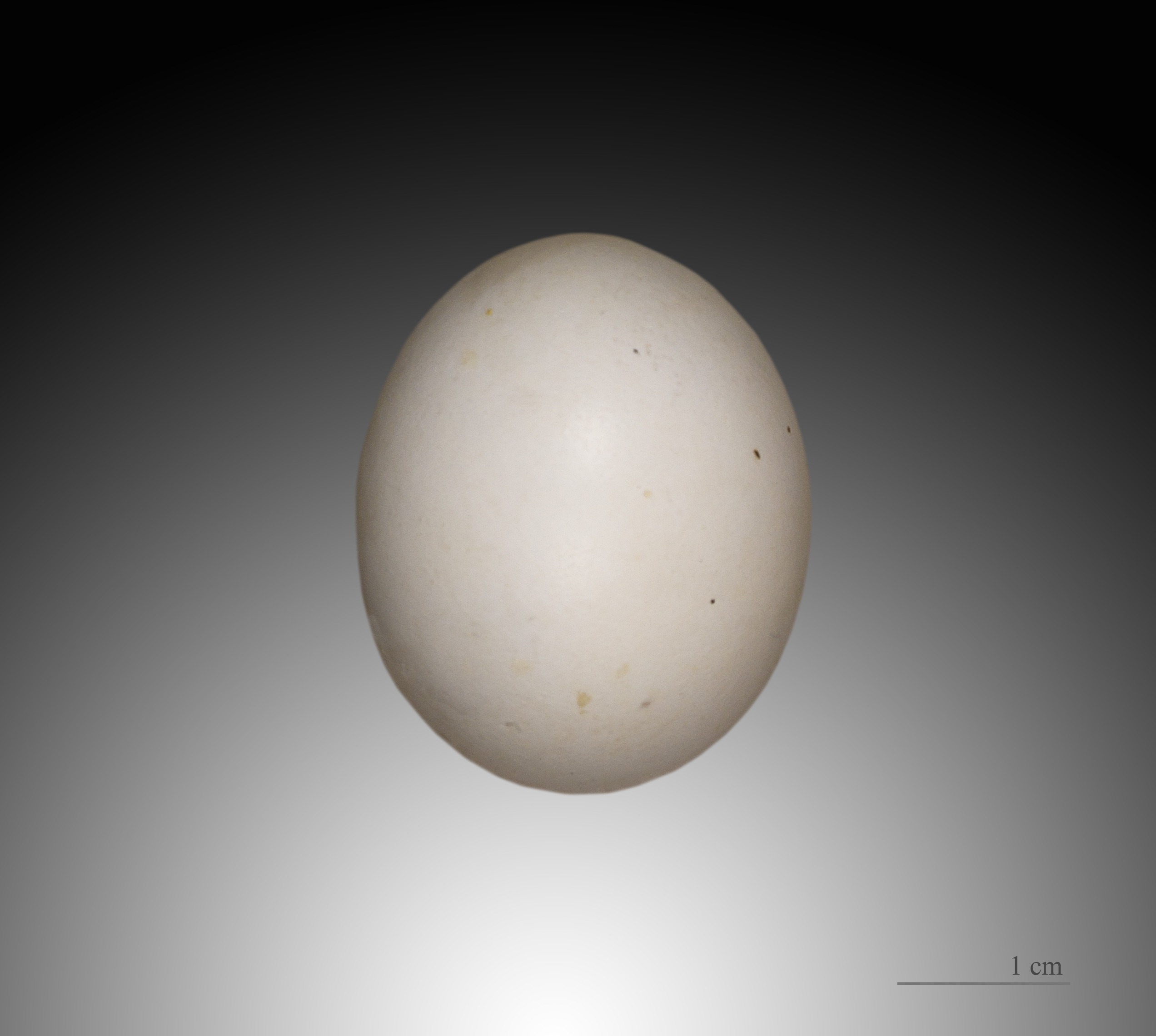
Nesoenas picturatus egg - MHNT

== Taxonomy ==
The bird has several subspecies. The Rodrigues pigeon, an extinct but fairly enigmatic taxon from Rodrigues on the Mascarenes, was for some time suspected to be another subspecies of N. picturata, but today is generally considered a distinct species (N. rodericanus).

The pink pigeon (N. mayeri) is its closest living relative, and together they form a lineage apart from both the typical pigeons (Columba) and the typical turtle doves (Streptopelia), slightly closer to the latter, if anything. Consequently, either these two are both placed in Streptopelia, or – as is probably the most accurate solution at present – separated as Nesoenas. The present species was in former times sometimes placed in a monotypic genus Homopelia. While this is not outright wrong, if the Rodrigues population is also placed in Homopelia and Nesoenas is considered distinct too, it would probably be considered oversplitting by modern authors.

== Distribution and habitat ==
It is found in Madagascar, Mauritius, Comoros, Réunion, Mayotte, Seychelles and the Chagos Archipelago.

== Status and conservation ==
Though some island populations are rare – some precariously so – as a whole N. picturata is considered a species of least concern by the IUCN.
