= Rodrigues blue pigeon =

Conservation status
- Extinct (IUCN 3.1)

Scientific classification
- Kingdom: Animalia
- Phylum: Chordata
- Class: Aves
- Order: Columbiformes
- Family: Columbidae
- Genus: Alectroenas
- Species: †A. payandeei

Binomial name
- †Alectroenas payandeei (Hume, 2011)
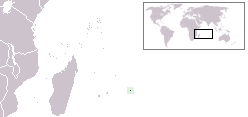
- Former range

Extinct species of bird

The Rodrigues blue pigeon (Alectroenas payandeei) is an extinct species of blue pigeon which was endemic to Rodrigues. It is known only from the holotype tarsometatarsus collected in 2005, associated with remains of a Rodrigues night heron and a Rodrigues rail. A femur described in 1879 but now lost may also have belonged to the species. It was not specifically mentioned by contemporary writers, and it is therefore unknown when it became extinct.
