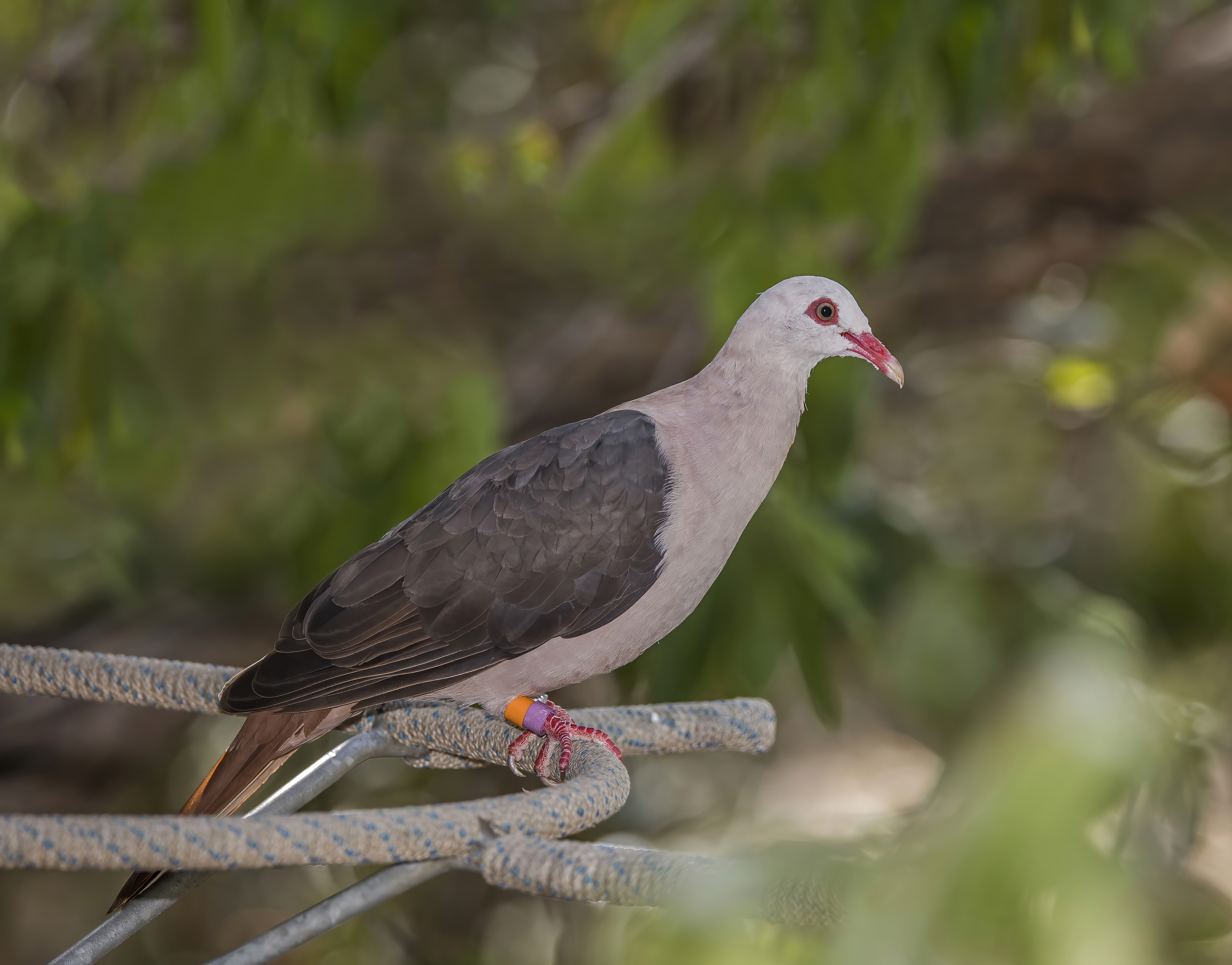
- on Île aux Aigrettes, Mauritius

Conservation status
- Vulnerable (IUCN 3.1)

Scientific classification
- Kingdom: Animalia
- Phylum: Chordata
- Class: Aves
- Order: Columbiformes
- Family: Columbidae
- Genus: Nesoenas
- Species: N. mayeri

Binomial name
- Nesoenas mayeri (Prévost, 1843)

Synonyms
- Columba mayeri Prévost, 1843; Streptopelia mayeri: Johnson et al., 2001

= Pink pigeon =

Species of bird

The pink pigeon (Nesoenas mayeri) is a species of pigeon in the family Columbidae endemic to Mauritius. The pink pigeon nearly became extinct in the 1970s and the 1990s and is still very rare. It is the only Mascarene pigeon that has not become extinct. It was on the brink of extinction in 1991 when only 10 individuals remained, but its numbers have increased due to the efforts of the Durrell Wildlife Conservation Trust since 1977. While the population remains at below 500 birds as of 2011, the IUCN downlisted the species from critically endangered to endangered on the IUCN Red List in 2000, and then downlisted it again to vulnerable in 2018.

== Taxonomy and evolution ==
Initially classified as a true pigeon, the pink pigeon was reclassified in a monotypic genus by Tommaso Salvadori. Recent DNA analyses suggest its nearest relative is the geographically close Malagasy turtle dove (Nesoenas picturata), and it has thus been suggested that it be placed in the genus Streptopelia, which mostly contains turtle doves. However, the two species form a distinct group that cannot unequivocally be assigned to either Streptopelia or Columba, and placing both species in Nesoenas may best reflect the fact that they seem to belong to a distinct evolutionary lineage. This classification has been followed here. The extinct Réunion pink pigeon is now considered a subspecies.

== Description ==
An adult pink pigeon is about 36–38 centimetres (14–15 in) from beak to tail and 350 grams in weight. Pink pigeons have pale pinkish-grey plumage on their head, shoulders and underside, along with pink feet. The beak is a dark pink color with a white tip. They have dark brown wings, and a broad, rust-colored tail. Their eyes are dark brown surrounded by an eye-ring of red skin. Newly hatched pigeons have sparse, downy-white feathers and closed eyes.

The voice of the pink pigeon consists of a flight call that is a short, hardened "hoo hoo". The territorial call of the male pink pigeon is a series of coos.

== Distribution and habitat ==
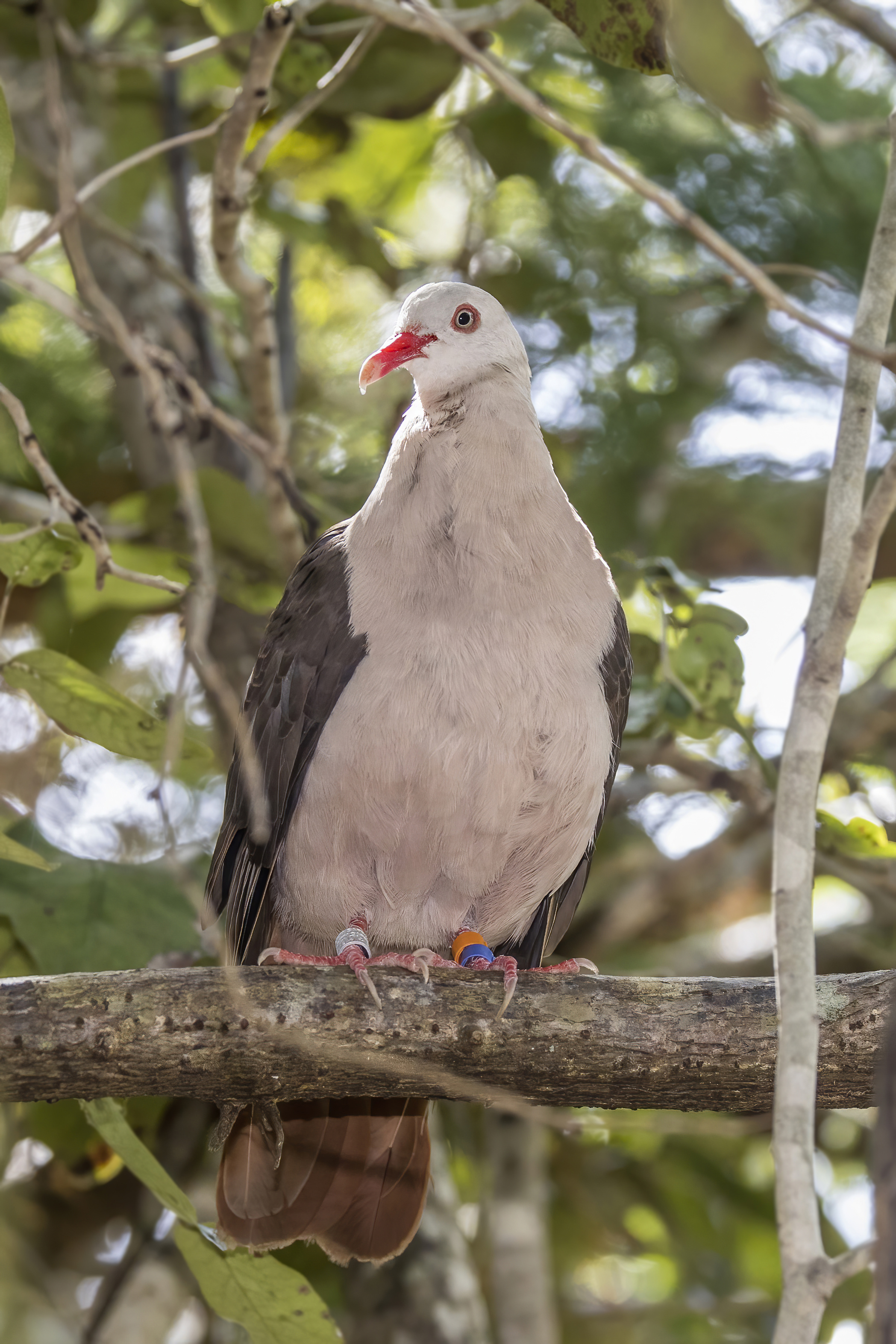
On Île aux Aigrettes

The species is endemic to the Mascarene island of Mauritius, a small island to the east of Madagascar in the Indian Ocean, and the tiny predator-free island of Île aux Aigrettes off its eastern coast. A subspecies, the Réunion pink pigeon, became extinct on the neighbouring Reunion Island around 1700.

As of 2016, there are five places where wild populations of the pink pigeon can be found. Four of these locations belong to Black River Gorges National Park and the fifth to Isle aux Aigrettes. All are monitored by the Mauritian Wildlife Foundation. The species is not migratory.

The species prefers upland evergreen forests, but is equally at home in coastal forests as long as the vegetation is native and not dominated by introduced species such as Chinese Guava (Psidium cattleianum) or the privet (Ligustrum robustum). Destruction of such primal forests has been a major reason for its decline.

== Behavior and ecology ==
The breeding season of the pink pigeon begins in August–September, although birds may breed all year round. The male courts the female with a "step and bow" display. Mating is generally monogamous, with the pair making a flimsy platform nest and defending a small area around it (even though the pigeons initially had no natural predators, one mating pair must defend their territory from other mating pairs). Pink pigeons generally mate for life. The female usually lays two white eggs, and incubation duration is two weeks. The male incubates during the day, and the female during night and early day. They may breed often, laying five to 10 eggs in a season; breeding only pauses in the wild whilst in molt, which may be full or a partial-body/head molt.

There are more males than females in a population due to greater life expectancy of the male (about five years more) and in the wild a higher chance of the female being predated. One reason for the difference in life span is that producing eggs is extremely metabolically taxing, and since female birds are nearly constantly producing eggs (even when they are not fertilized, just like domestic chickens do) this can end up totaling to a large metabolic tax on the female's survival. In captivity, males remain fertile to an age of 17–18 years, females to an age of 10–11 years.

Life history timeline:

- 1 – 7 days: Chicks eyes closed, fed entirely on crop milk.
- 7 – 10 days: Chicks undergo a dietary transformation to solid food.
- 2 – 4 weeks: Chicks fledge, but remain parent-fed.
- 4 - 6/7 weeks: Chicks remain in the nest. After this, the chicks leave the nest.

=== Diet ===
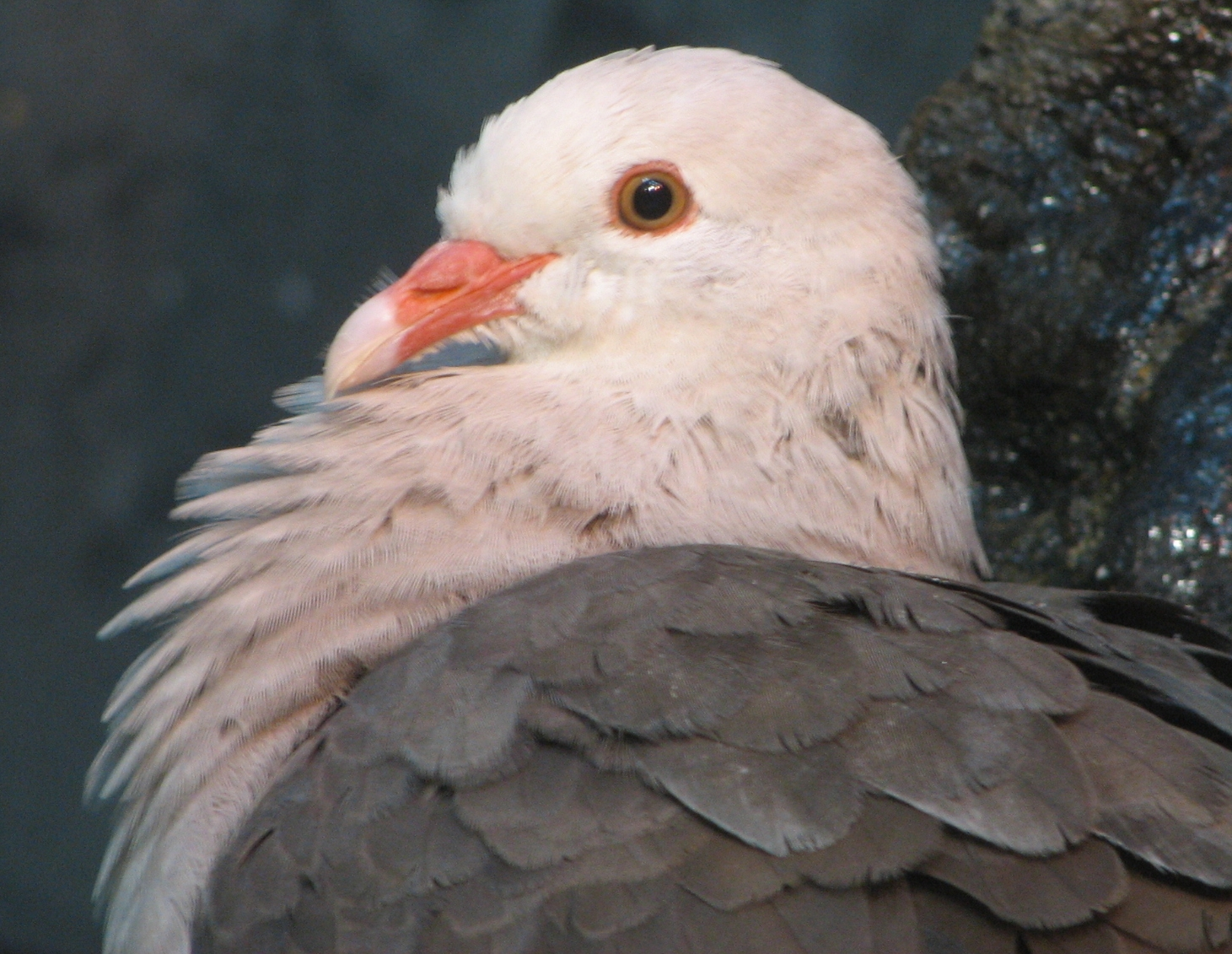
Close-up of head

The pink pigeon is herbivorous, feeding on both exotic and native plants - consuming buds, flowers, leaves, shoots, fruits and seeds. These birds exhibit ground-feeding behaviors, moving and turning over leaf litter in order to find food and grit (for use as gizzard stones).

Because the pink pigeon's natural habitat has become degraded, natural food sources have in the past been deemed insufficient to sustain the wild population or allow successful breeding and chick-rearing. The MWF and other organizations are providing supplemental feeding stations that offer diet items like whole wheat. To prevent other bird species from plundering this feed, special feeding platforms have been designed that allow access primarily to pink pigeons only.

== Conservation ==
The pink pigeon is currently classified as Vulnerable by the IUCN, having been downlisted from Endangered in 2018 and Critically Endangered in 2000. Due to habitat destruction and introduced predators, the population had dropped to 10 in 1991. The captive breeding and reintroduction program initiated and supported by the Durrell Wildlife Conservation Trust and largely carried out by the Mauritian Wildlife Foundation has resulted in a population of about 400 in the wild in 2018, as well as a healthy captive population as backup.

Several foundations and organizations have contributed to conservation efforts. In addition to direct conservation efforts such as captive breeding, genetic research, and supplementary feeding efforts, more general research on the species may aid in the formation of more applicable conservation actions.

Since October 2021, N. mayeri has been classified as Critically Depleted by the IUCN.

=== Threats ===
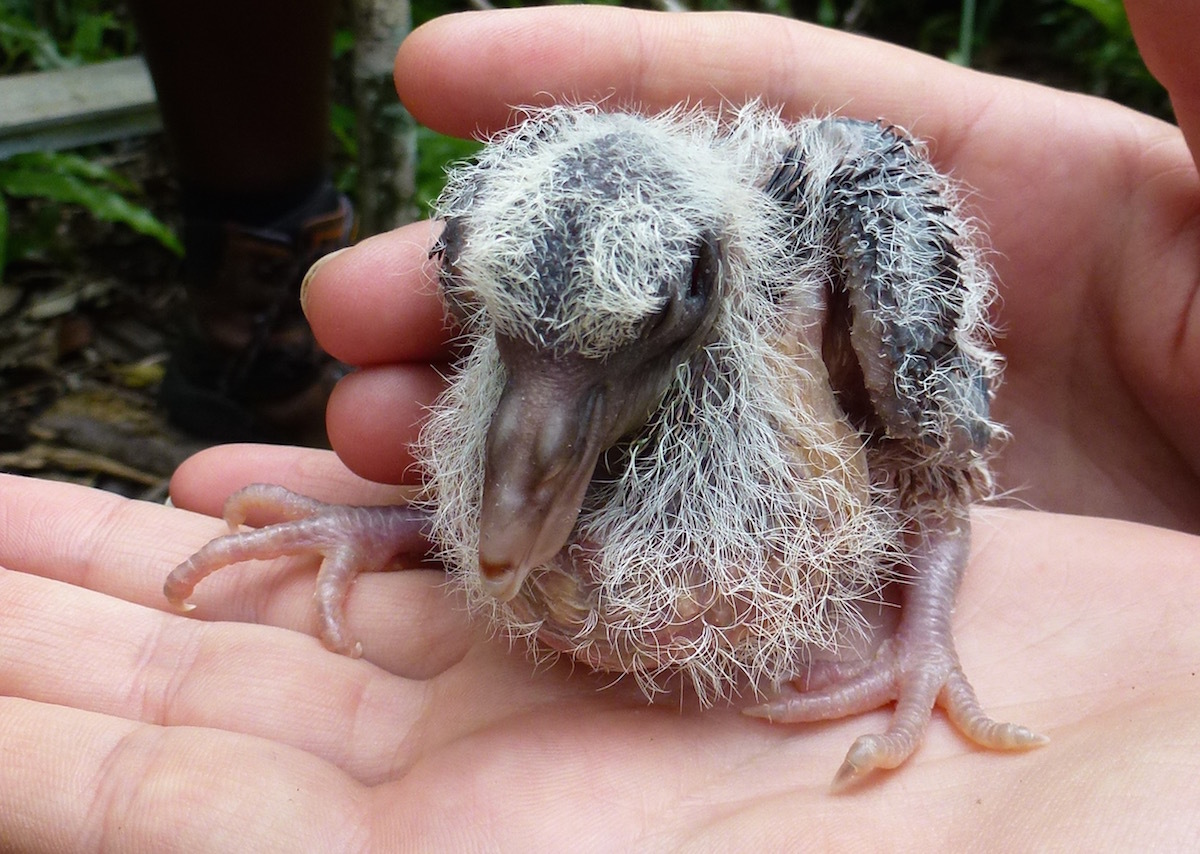
Chick

Habitat degradation, introduced predators, and wildlife disease are the major ongoing threats to the pink pigeon's survival. Only 2% of the native forest remains in Mauritius, with the majority of these remaining forests on upland slopes around the Black River Gorge National Park.

Common predators include the crab-eating macaque (Macaca fascicularis), the small Asian mongoose (Urva auropunctata), rats, and feral cats. Invasive plant species, such as the Chinese guava and privet, dominate native forest plants, preventing their growth. Without these native plant species, the pink pigeon finds it hard to locate sound nesting locations or food sources. Extreme weather events such as cyclones may also further the degradation of habitat.

The feeding stations that provide supplementary feed may accelerate the spread of disease between individuals, who congregate at greater than normal numbers at stations. This may apply to trichomonosis, originally brought to Mauritius by introduced pigeons. Feeding stations therefore have to be closely managed to reduce the associated risks.

An ongoing concern faced by the pink pigeon, as by many endangered species that exist in small remnant populations, is inbreeding depression.

== In culture ==
The book Golden Bats and Pink Pigeons by Gerald Durrell describes the conservation efforts.

Mauritius has published a series of postage stamps depicting the pink pigeon.

== See also ==
- Gerald Durrell Endemic Wildlife Sanctuary
