= Hackles =

Erectile plumage or hair in the neck

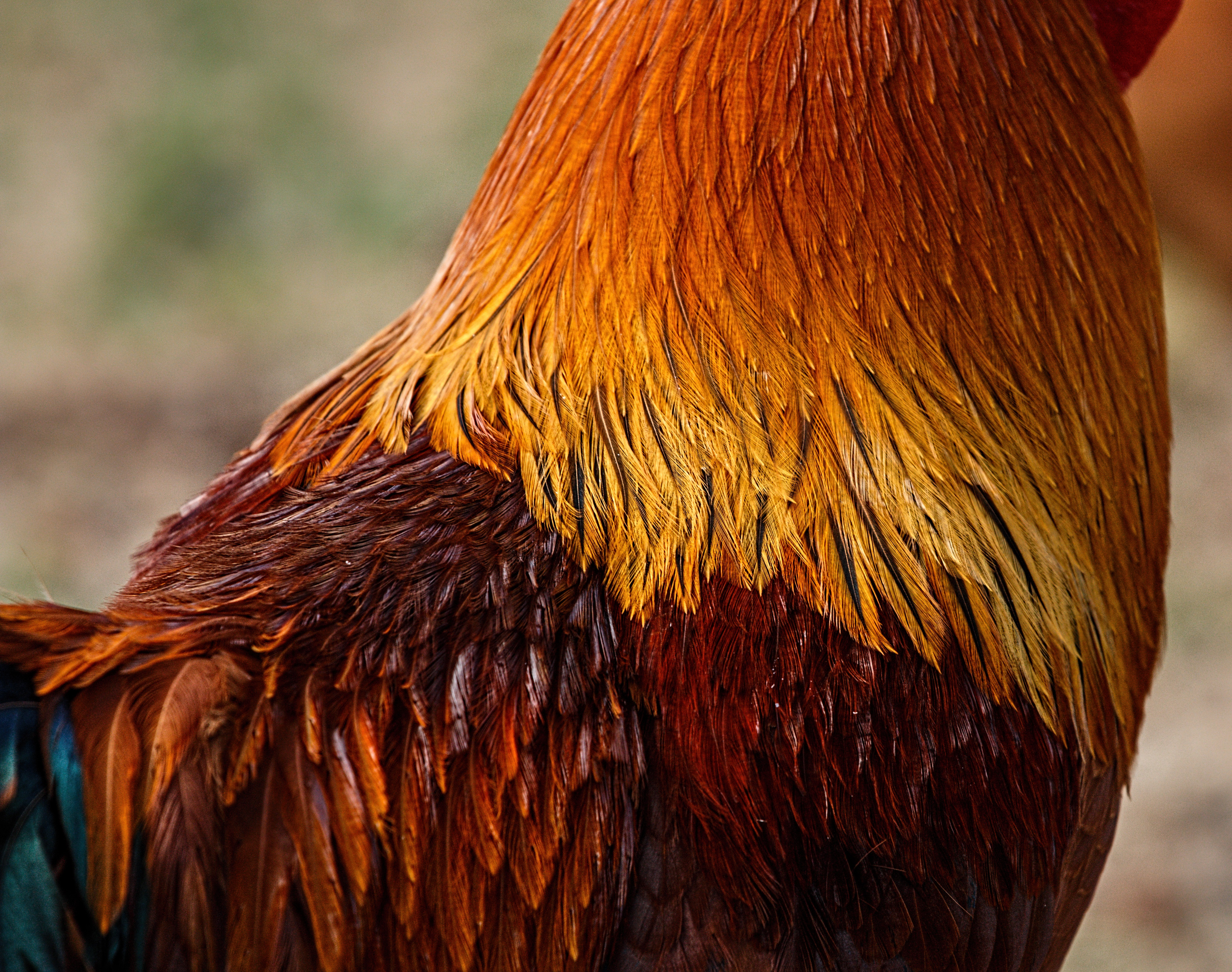
Yellow hackles on the neck area of a rooster

Hackles are the erectile plumage or hair in the neck area of some birds and mammals.

In birds, the hackle is the group of feathers found along the back and side of the neck. The hackles of some types of chicken, particularly roosters, are long, fine, and often brightly coloured. These hackles may be used in fly fishing as lures.

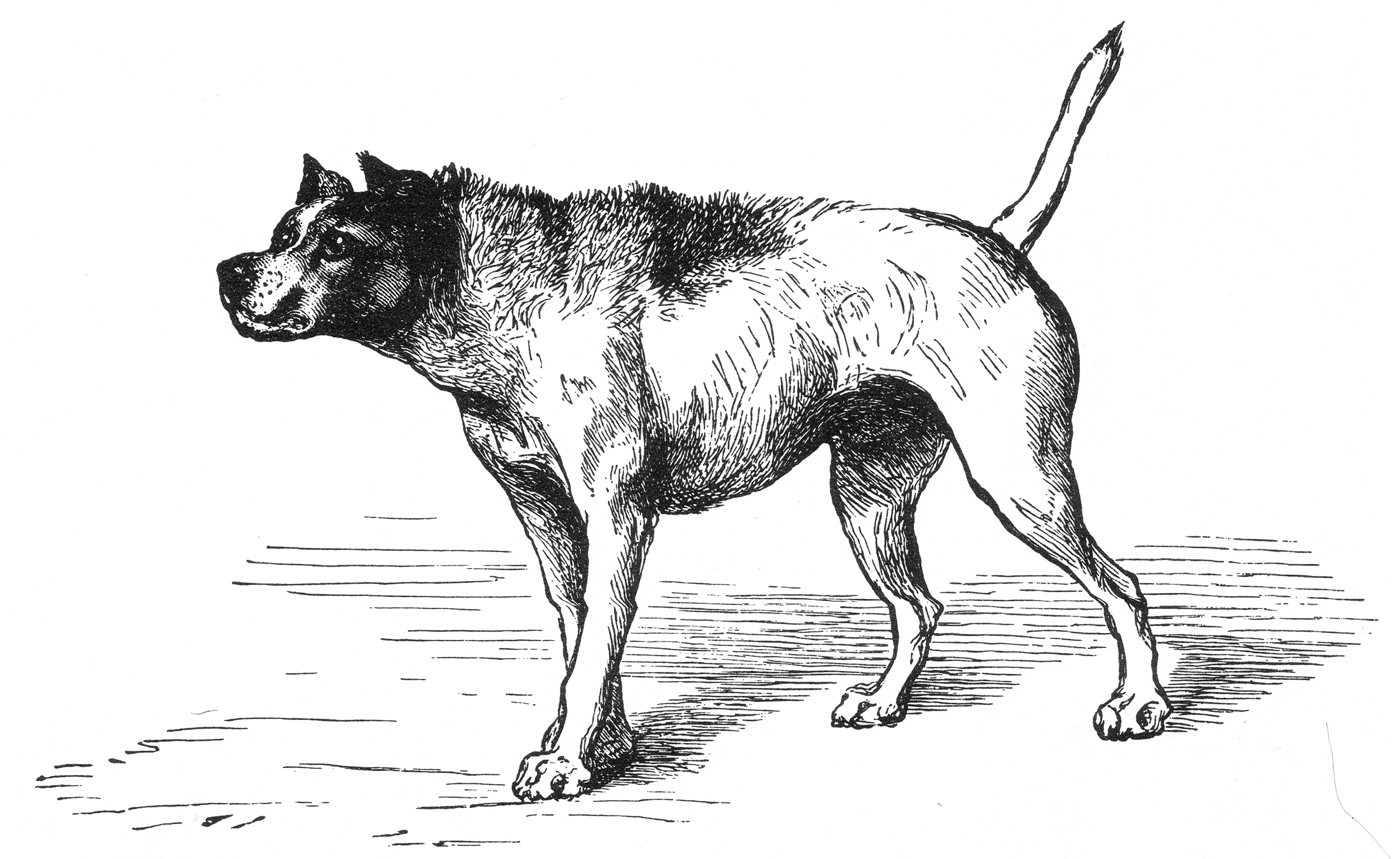
Drawing of a dog with raised hackles

In mammals, the hackles are the hairs of the neck and back which become erect when the animal is fearful, as part of the fight-or-flight response, or to show dominance over subordinate animals. Raising the hackles causes the animal to appear larger, and acts as a visual warning to other animals. Raised hackles are used by grey wolves as a dominance behavior, by moose preparing to attack, and by cats and striped hyena which are fearful or threatened. The process by which the hair is raised is called piloerection. The contraction of the arrector pili muscle associated with each hair follicle causes the hair to become erect.
