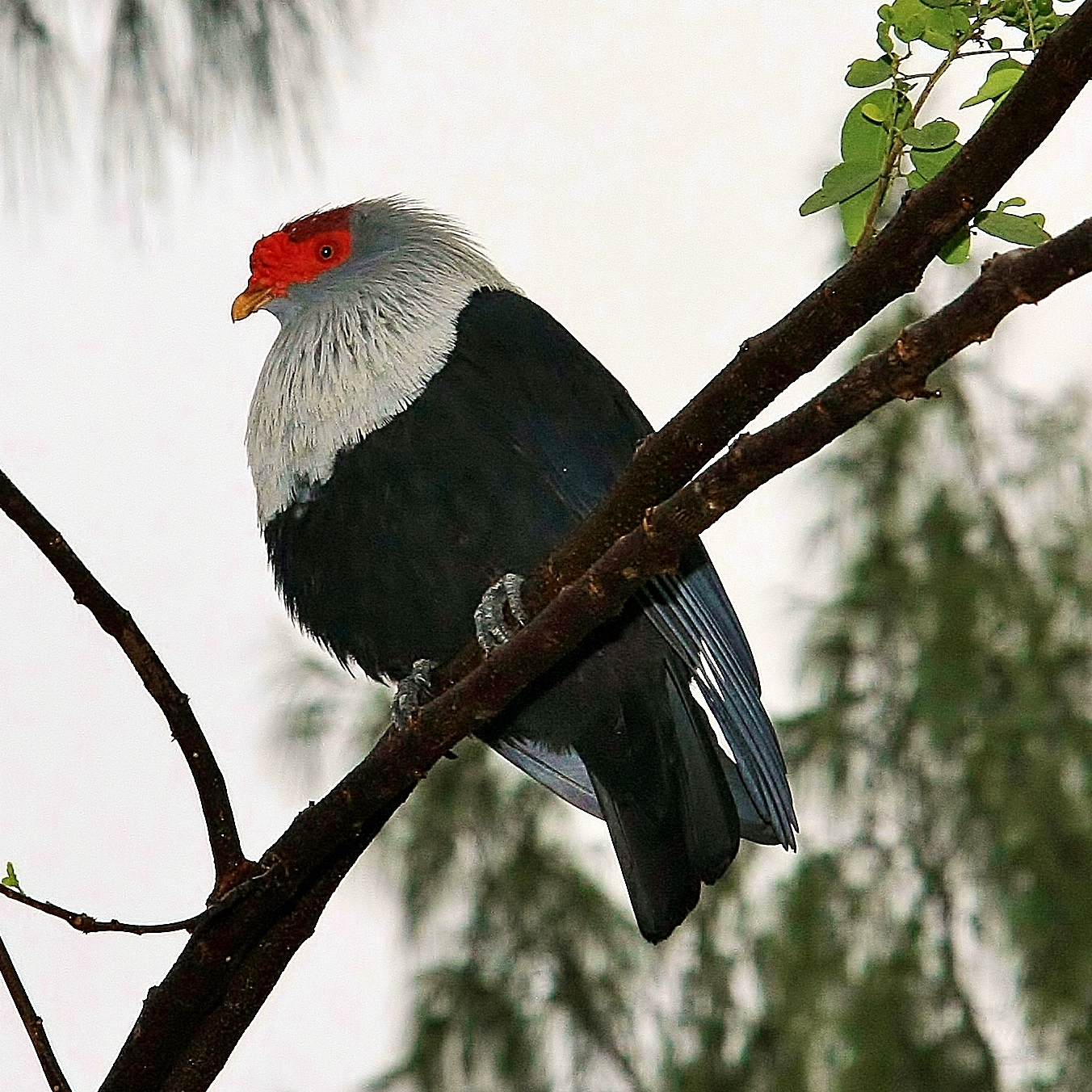
- On Denis Island, Seychelles

Conservation status
- Least Concern (IUCN 3.1)

Scientific classification
- Kingdom: Animalia
- Phylum: Chordata
- Class: Aves
- Order: Columbiformes
- Family: Columbidae
- Genus: Alectroenas
- Species: A. pulcherrimus

Binomial name
- Alectroenas pulcherrimus (Scopoli, 1786)

= Seychelles blue pigeon =

Species of bird

The Seychelles blue pigeon (Alectroenas pulcherrimus), also known as the Seychelles blue fruit dove, is a medium-sized pigeon which inhabits woodland areas of the granitic Seychelles archipelago.

== Description ==
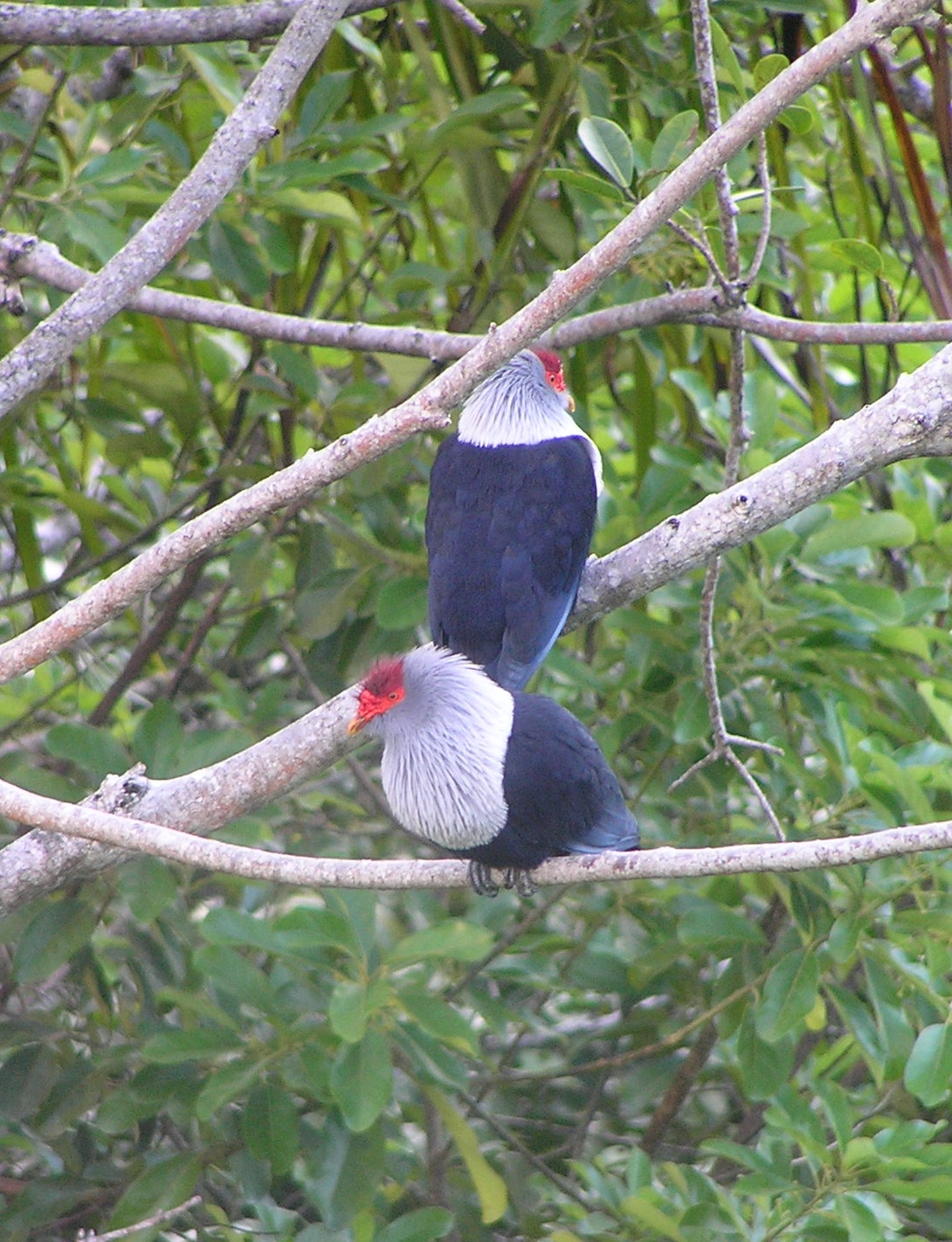
Couple

The Seychelles blue pigeon is about 10 inches (25.4 cm) in length. Its head and breast are silver-grey, and these feathers can be raised when the bird is excited, giving it a ruffled look. Its wings, under-body and tail are dark blue. It has a distinctive bright crimson patch of orbital skin extending from forehead to crown. Its bill is dull yellow and it has dark grey legs. The juvenile is very different, with a dark grey head and bib, dark greenish brown upperparts with pale yellow fringes, dark crown feathers with obvious green edges and a dark pink wattle around the eye.

== Distribution and habitat ==
The Seychelles blue pigeon is found on all the larger granitic islands of the Seychelles, plus Denis Island and Bird Island on the edge of the Seychelles Bank. Numbers have greatly increased since the cessation of human exploitation for food, a practice that died out around the late 1970s. Since then birds have recolonised Curieuse (early 1980s), Denis (late 1980s), Aride Island (1990) and Bird (2009).

== Behaviour ==
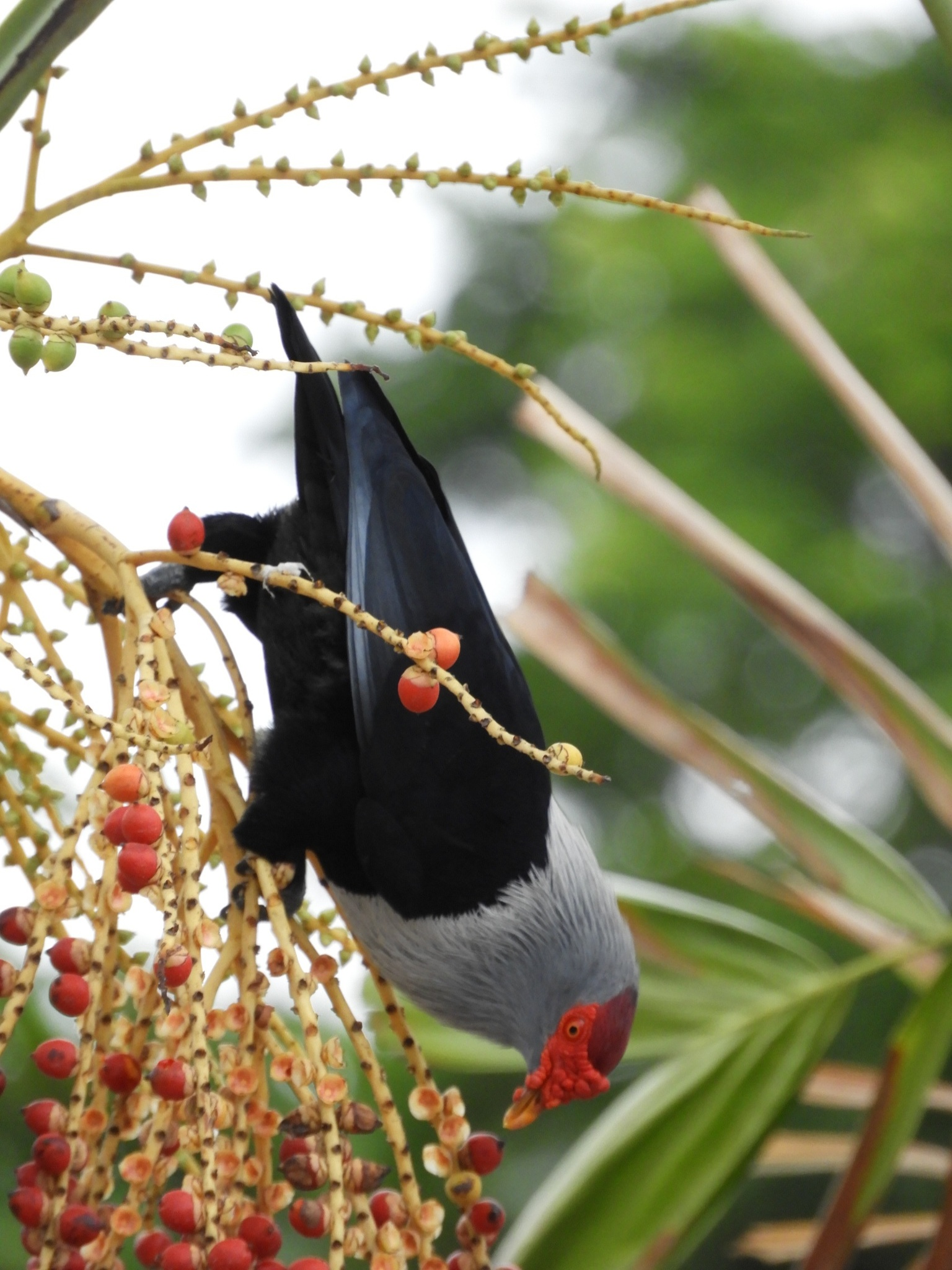
Feeding on palm fruit

It can be found either singly, in pairs or in small groups. In courtship birds fly high above the tree canopy, before plummeting downward at a steep angle, wings held rigidly forward and downward. This procedure may be repeated before landing in a tree. The male bows and coos to the female, raising plume feathers on the neck and head or struts up and down a branch plumes extended, turning his head 180°, then back again.

=== Feeding ===
Their diet consists mostly of seeds and fruit.

=== Breeding ===
Breeding may take place at any time of the year, but is concentrated in October to April. The nest, built entirely by the female, is an untidy platform of twigs in a tree or shrub. Usually one white egg is laid, occasionally two. Incubation takes about 28 days, fledging about 21 days.

== Status and conservation ==
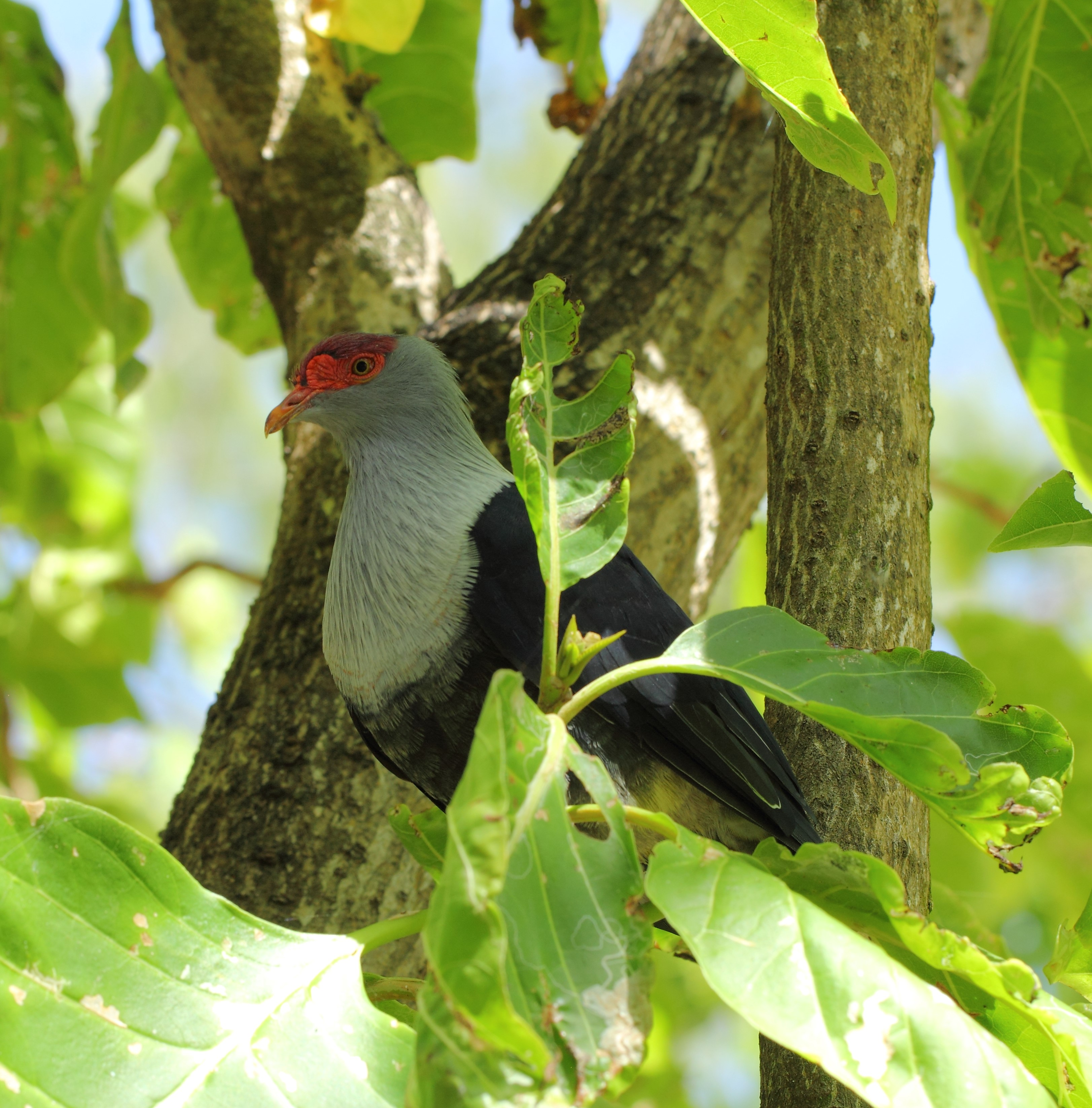
On Cousin Island

It was once shot for food and by farmers as an alleged pest, but now the population appears to be thriving. Habitat conservation is important to the continued survival of the species, because blue pigeons have muscular gizzards, which break down seeds to aid digestion. Consequently, unlike those of other pigeons, their droppings contain no viable seeds.
