= List of bird extinctions by year =

The accuracy of these dates for bird extinctions varies wildly between one entry and another. Hypothetical species, which cannot be proven to have existed due to a lack of physical evidence, are tagged with (H).

== 15th century ==
- North Island giant moa (Dinornis novaezealandiae)
- South Island giant moa (Dinornis robustus)
- Bush moa (Anomalopteryx didiformis)
- Broad-billed moa (Euryapteryx curtus)
- Heavy-footed moa (Pachyornis elephantopus)
- Mantell's moa (Pachyornis geranoides)

c. 1400

- Haast's eagle (Hieraaetus moorei)
- Eyles's harrier (Circus teauteensis)
- Eastern moa (Emeus crassus)

c. 1396-1442

- Crested moa (Pachyornis australis)

== 16th century ==
- Ascension night heron (Nycticorax olsoni)
- Chatham Island duck (Anas chathamica)
- New Zealand musk duck (Biziura delautouri)
- Scarlett's duck (Malacorhynchus scarletti)

c. 1500

- Upland moa (Megalapteryx didinus)

After c. 1502

- Saint Helena petrel (Pterodroma rupinarum)
- Olson's petrel (Bulweria bifax)

Possibly before 1555

- Antillean cave rail (Nesotrochis debooyi)

== Sometime before European settlement of New Zealand ==
- North Island adzebill (Aptornis otidiformis)
- South Island adzebill (Aptornis defossor)

== 17th century ==
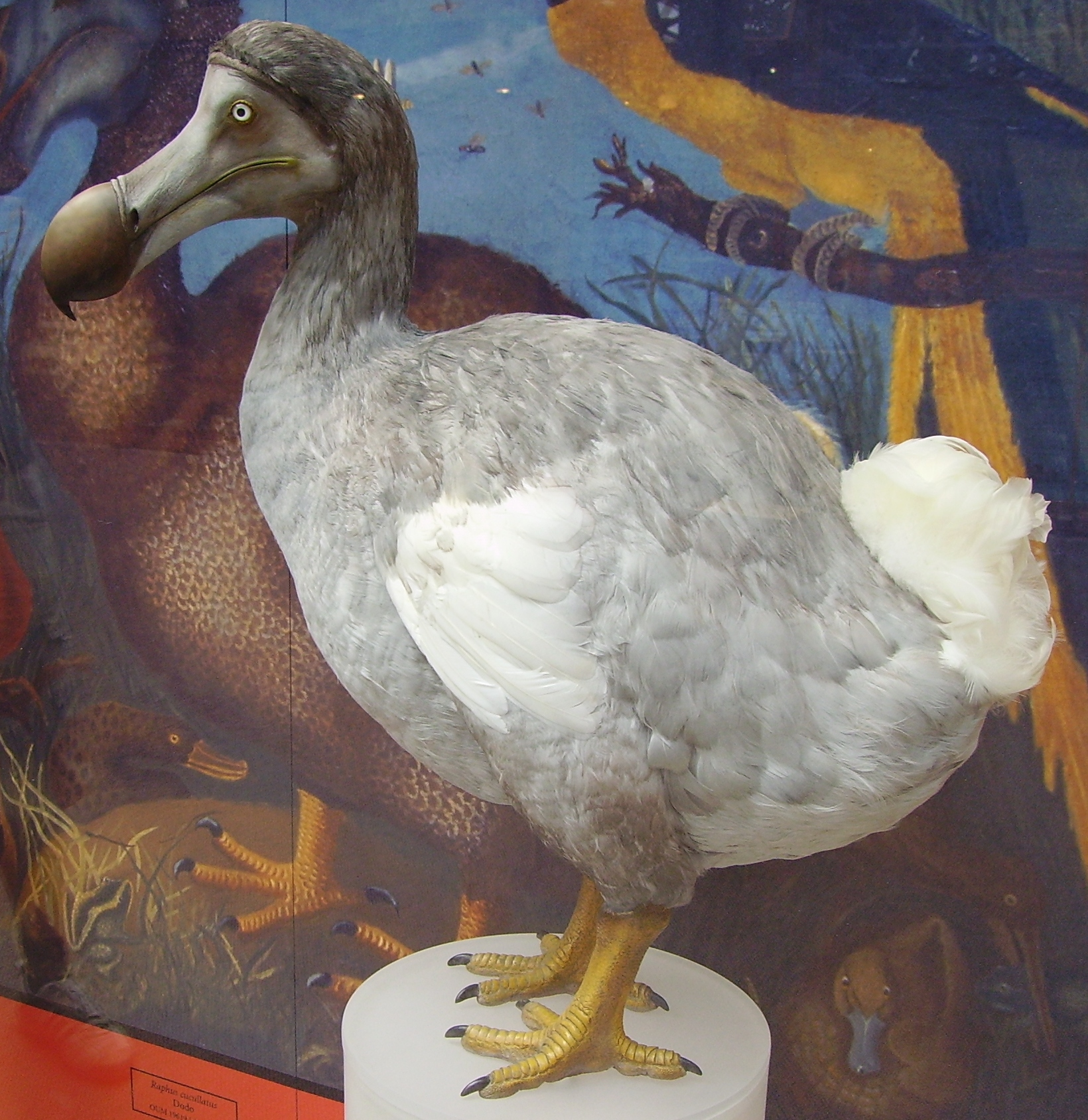
Dodo

- Bermuda saw-whet owl (Aegolius gradyi)
- Finsch's duck (Chenonetta finschi)

1610

- Bermuda night heron (Nyctanassa carcinocatactes)

1612

- Bermuda towhee (Pipilo naufragus)

1650

- New Zealand swan (Cygnus sumnerensis)

1662

- Dodo (Raphus cucullatus)

Shortly after 1672

- Réunion fody (Foudia delloni)

After 1674

- Réunion rail (Dryolimnas augusti)

c. 1680s

- Broad-billed parrot (Lophopsittacus mauritianus)

c. ~1690s

- Mauritius night heron (Nycticorax mauritianus)

c. 1690

- Réunion sheldgoose (Alopochen kervazoi)

Shortly after 1693

- Red rail (Aphanapteryx bonasia)

1696

- Mascarene teal (Anas theodori)

Late 17th century

- Réunion scops owl (Otus grucheti)

1650-1700

- Chatham penguin (Eudyptes warhami)

== Before the 18th century ==
- Cheke's wood rail (Dryolimnas chekei)

== 18th century ==
- Saint Helena cuckoo (Nannococcyx psix)

c. 1700

- Rodrigues rail (Erythromachus leguati)
- Mauritius scops owl (Otus sauzieri)
- Réunion pink pigeon (Nesoenas mayeri duboisi)

Between 1710 and 1715

- Réunion ibis (Threskiornis solitarius)

After 1710

- Réunion pochard (Aythya sp.)

c. 1730

- Réunion swamphen (Porphyrio caerulescens) (H)

1732

- Réunion parakeet (Psittacula eques eques)

1735

- Mauritian wood pigeon (Columba thiriouxi)

Mid-18th century

- Rodrigues solitaire (Pezophaps solitaria)
- Rodrigues scops owl (Otus murivorus)
- Rodrigues pigeon (Nesoenas rodericanus)

After 1777

- Tongatapu rail (Gallirallus hypoleucus)

c. 1779

- Guadeloupe amazon (Amazona violacea) (H)

1779

- Martinique amazon (Amazona martinicana) (H)

c. 1760

- Lesser Antillean macaw (Ara guadeloupensis) (H)

Soon after 1761

- Rodrigues parrot (Necropsittacus rodricanus)

1765 or later

- Jamaican red macaw (Ara gossei) (H)

c. 1777

- Raiatea parakeet (Cyanoramphus ulietanus)

After 1777

- Moorea sandpiper (Prosobonia ellisi)

Late 1700s

- Guadeloupe parakeet (Psittacara labati)

Perhaps c. 1793

- Oceanic eclectus (Eclectus infectus)

After 1793

- Vava'u rail (Hypotaenidia vavauensis)

c. late 18th century

- Pile-builder megapode (Megapodius molistructor)

Probably before 1800

- ʻEua rail (Gallirallus vekamatolu)

Between 1774 and 1850

- Raiatea starling (Aplonis? ulietensis)

== 19th century ==
- Imber's petrel (Pterodroma imberi)

Late 18th or early 19th century

- Dominican green-and-yellow macaw (Ara atwoodi) (H)

Perhaps 19th century

- Garrett's reed warbler (Acrocephalus musae)

Perhaps early 19th century

- Red-headed macaw (Ara erythrocephala) (H)
- Ascension crake (Mundia elpenor)

1800

- Amsterdam wigeon (Mareca marecula)
- Norfolk ground dove (Pampusana norfolkensis)

c. 1800

- Tanna ground dove (Pampusana ferruginea)
- Christmas sandpiper (Prosobonia cancellata)
- Norfolk Island rail (Gallirallus sp.)

1819

- Tahiti sandpiper (Prosobonia leucoptera)

1820s

- Spotted green pigeon (Caloenas maculata)

1822

- King Island emu (Dromaius novaehollandiae minor)

After 1823

- Maupiti monarch (Pomarea maupitiensis)

c. 1827

- Kangaroo Island emu (Dromaius novaehollandiae baudinianus)

c. 1830s

- Mauritius blue pigeon (Alectroenas nitidissimus)
- Bonin thrush (Zoothera terrestris)

1830s

- Bonin grosbeak (Carpodacus ferreorostris)

c. 1834

- White swamphen (Porphyrio albus)

1834

- Mascarene parrot (Mascarinus mascarinus)
- Delalande's coua (Coua delalandei)

1839

- Oʻahu ʻōʻō (Moho apicalis)

After 1841

- Oahu nukupu'u (Hemignathus lucidus)

c. 1850

- Mauritius scops owl (Otus sauzieri)
- Spectacled cormorant (Urile perspicillatus)
- Hoopoe starling (Fregilupus varius)

1850

- Black-fronted parakeet (Cyanoramphus zealandicus)

Mid-19th century

- Mauke starling (Aplonis mavornata)
- Kosrae starling (Aplonis corvina)
- Kosrae crake (Zapornia monasa)
- Mascarene booby (Papasula sp.)

1851

- Norfolk kākā (Nestor productus)

1852

- Great auk (Pinguinus impennis)

1853

- Lord Howe pigeon (Columba vitiensis godmanae)

1859

- Kioea (Chaetoptila angustipluma)

1860

- Jamaican poorwill (Siphonorhis americana) (Note: The species has not been recorded since 1860 and is yet to be declared extinct by the IUCN as of September 2025)
- Gould's emerald (Riccordia elegans)

Perhaps 1860

- New Caledonian gallinule (Porphyrio kukwiedei)

1865

- Tasmanian emu (Dromaius novaehollandiae diemenensis)

1870 or later

- North Island snipe (Coenocorypha barrierensis)

1872

- Dieffenbach's rail (Hypotaenidia dieffenbachii)

1874

- Coues's gadwall (Mareca strepera couesi)

c. 1875

- Newton's parakeet (Psittacula exsul)

1875

- New Zealand quail (Coturnix novaezelandiae)

1876

- Himalayan quail (Ophrysia superciliosa) (Note: The species has not been recorded since 1876 and is yet to be declared extinct by the IUCN as of September 2025)

1877

- Brace's emerald (Riccordia bracei)

c. 1878

- Labrador duck (Camptorhynchus labradorius)

Perhaps 1880

- Macquarie rail (Hypotaenidia philippensis macquariensis)

1881

- Jamaican wood rail (Amaurolimnas concolor concolor)

c. 1884

- Hawaiian rail (Zapornia sandwichensis)

c. 1885

- Cuban macaw (Ara tricolor)

1887-1899

- Ryukyu kingfisher (Todiramphus cinnamominus miyakoensis)

c. 1888 (between 1870 and 1900)

- Marianne white-eye (Zosterops semiflavus)

1889

- Bonin wood pigeon (Columba versicolor)

c. 1890

- Bonin nankeen night heron (Nycticorax caledonicus crassirostris)
- Guadeloupe burrowing owl (A. c. guadeloupensis)

After 1890

- New Zealand bittern (Botaurus novaezelandiae)

1891

- Macquarie parakeet (Cyanoramphus novaezelandiae erythrotis)
- Lesser koa-finch (Rhodacanthis flaviceps)

1892

- ʻUla-ʻai-hāwane (Ciridops anna)

After 1892

- Maui Nui ʻakialoa (Akialoa lanaiensis)
- Oahu 'akialoa (Akialoa ellisiana)

1893

- Seychelles parakeet (Psittacula wardi)

1894

- Kona grosbeak (Chloridops kona)
- North Island takahē (Porphyrio mantelli)

1895

- Hawkins's rail (Diaphorapteryx hawkinsi)

1896

- Greater koa-finch (Rhodacanthis palmeri)

1897

- Guadalupe wren (Thryomanes bewickii brevicauda)

1898

- Hawaiʻi mamo (Drepanis pacifica)

Late 19th century

- Tristan moorhen (Gallinula nesiotis)
- Mangarevan whistler (Pachycephala gambierana) (nomen dubium)

== c. 20th century ==
- Viti Levu scrubfowl (Megapodius amissus)

== 20th century ==
- Red-throated wood rail (Aramides gutturalis) (nomen dubium)

c. ~1895-1905

- Norfolk pigeon (Hemiphaga novaeseelandiae spadicea)
- Lyall's Wren (Traversia lyalli)

c. 1900

- Puerto Rican parakeet (Psittacara maugei)
- Chatham Island rail (Cabalus modestus)

1900

- Chatham Islands fernbird (Poodytes rufescens)

1901

- Greater ʻamakihi (Viridonia sagittirostris)

c. 1902

- Auckland Island merganser (Mergus australis)

1903

- Guadalupe caracara (Caracara lutosa)

1904

- Choiseul pigeon (Microgoura meeki)

c. 1905

- Antiguan burrowing owl (Athene cunicularia amaura)
- South Island piopio (Turnagra capensis)

1906

- Chatham Islands bellbird (Anthornis melanocephala)

1907

- Huia (Heteralocha acutirostris)
- Black mamo (Drepanis funerea)

1908

- Alejandro Selkirk firecrown (Sephanoides fernandensis leyboldi)

After 1908

- Western rufous bristlebird (Dasyornis broadbenti litoralis)

Early 1910s

- (Louisiana) Carolina parakeet (Conuropsis carolinensis ludovicianus)

1910

- Slender-billed grackle (Quiscalus palustris)

After 1910

- Roper River scrub robin (Drymodes superciliaris colcloughi) (nomen dubium)

Possibly 1912

- Puerto Rican barn owl (Tyto cavatica)

1912 or later

- Culebra Island amazon (Amazona vittata gracilipes)

1914

- Passenger pigeon (Ectopistes migratorius)
- Laughing owl (Ninox albifacies)

1918

- Carolina parakeet (Conuropsis carolinensis)
- Lānaʻi hookbill (Dysmorodrepanis munroi)

1919

- Lord Howe starling (Aplonis fusca hulliana)

Late 1910s

- Laysan millerbird (Acrocephalus familiaris familiaris)

1922 or later

- Red-moustached fruit dove (Ptilinopus mercierii)

1923

- Laysan honeycreeper (Himatione fraithii)

c. 1924

- Lord Howe thrush (Turdus poliocephalus vinitinctus)
- Iwo Jima rail (Poliolimnas cinereus brevipes)

c. 1925

- Lord Howe fantail (Rhipidura fuliginosa cervina)

1927

- Paradise parrot (Psephotellus pulcherrimus)

After 1927

- Thick-billed ground dove (Pampusana salamonis)

After 1928

- Lord Howe gerygone (Gerygone insularis)

c. 1930s

- Tahiti rail (Hypotaenidia pacifica)

1930s

- Mukojima white-eye (Apalopteron familiare familiare)

1930

- Oʻahu ʻakepa (Loxops wolstenholmei)

1932

- Heath hen (Tympanuchus cupido cupido)

1932 or later

- Western Lewin's rail (Lewinia pectoralis clelandi)

1934

- Hawaiʻi ʻōʻō (Moho nobilis)

1937

- Lānaʻi ʻalauahio (Paroreomyza montana montana)

Perhaps 1937

- Marquesas swamphen (Porphyrio paepae)

c. 1940

- Daito wren (Troglodytes troglodytes orii) (nomen dubium)
- Daito varied tit (Sittiparus varius orii)

1940

- Lesser ʻakialoa (Akialoa obscura)

After 1942

- Norfolk triller (Lalage leucopyga leucopyga)

1944

- Laysan rail (Zapornia palmeri)

1945

- Wake Island rail (Hypotaenidia wakensis)

1950

- Canary Islands oystercatcher (Haematopus meadewaldoi)
- Grand Cayman oriole (Icterus leucopteryx bairdi)
- Cyprus dipper (Cinclus cinclus olympicus) (nomen dubium)

1930s or 1975

- Nuku Hiva monarch (Pomarea nukuhivae)

1952

- Niceforo's pintail (Anas georgica niceforoi)
- San Benedicto rock wren (Salpinctes obsoletus exsul)

1955

- North Island piopio (Turnagra tanagra)

1959

- Rennell Island teal (Anas gracilis remissa)

1963

- Kākāwahie (Paroreomyza flammea)

1964

- South Island snipe (Coenocorypha iredalei)

1965

- New Zealand Bush Wren (subsp.)

1966

- Arabian ostrich (Struthio camelus syriacus)

1969

- Kauaʻi ʻakialoa (Akialoa stejnegeri)
- Nightingale reed warbler (Acrocephalus luscinius)

1972

- Bushwren (Xenicus longipes)

1973

- Bar-winged rail (Hypotaenidia poeciloptera)

1975

- Norfolk thrush (Turdus poliocephalus poliocephalus)

1977

- Colombian grebe (Podiceps andinus)

1977 or later

- Eiao monarch (Pomarea fluxa)

Late 1970s

- Pagan reed warbler (Acrocephalus yamashinae)

1981

- Bishop's ʻōʻō (Moho bishopi)
- Mariana mallard (Anas oustaleti)

1983

- Aldabra brush warbler (Nesillas aldabrana)
- Guam flycatcher (Myiagra freycineti)

1985

- Alaotra Grebe (Tachybaptus rufolavatus)

1987

- Kauaʻi ʻōʻō (Moho braccatus)

1988

- Maui ʻAkepa (Loxops ochraceus)

1989

- Atitlán grebe (Podilymbus gigas)

1990

- Dusky seaside sparrow (Ammospiza maritima nigrescens)

1995 or later

- Aguiguan reed warbler (Acrocephalus nijoi)

== 21st century ==
2004

- Poʻouli (Melamprosops phaeosoma)

c. 2005

- White-chested white-eye (Zosterops albogularis)

2007

- Cryptic treehunter (Cichlocolaptes mazarbarnetti)
- Kauaʻi nukupuʻu (Hemignathus hanapepe) (Note: This species was likely already extinct by 1906, although an unconfirmed sighting was made in 2007. It was finally declared extinct in 2023.)

2011

- Alagoas foliage-gleaner (Philydor novaesi)

2024

- Slender-billed curlew (Numenius tenuirostris)

== See also ==
- List of extinct bird species since 1500
- Lists of extinct animals
- List of extinct animals of the Hawaiian Islands
- List of extinct animals of Martinique and Guadeloupe
- List of extinct animals of Réunion
