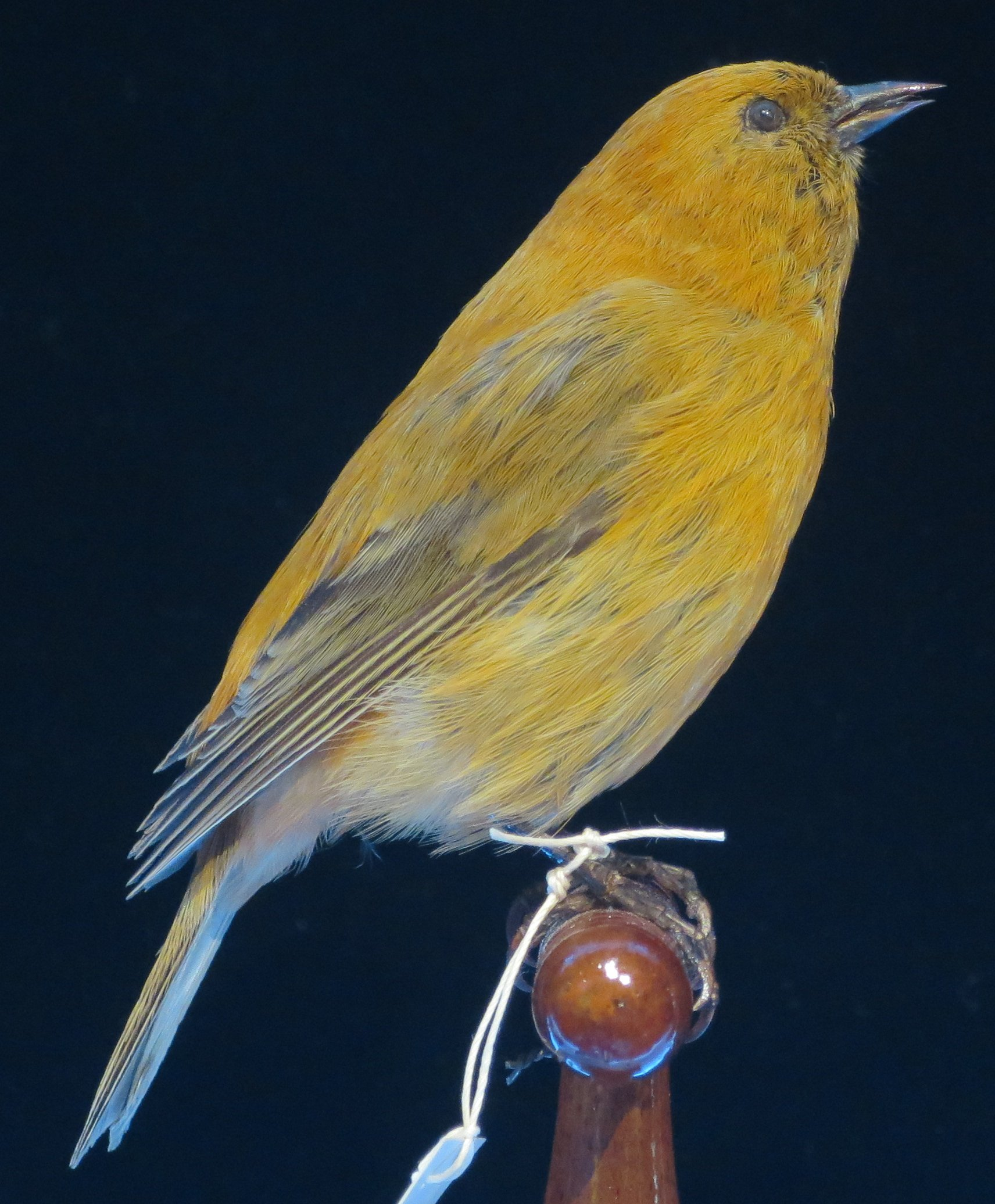
- The Maui ʻākepa, Loxops ochraceus. Specimen shown is a male.

Scientific classification
- Kingdom: Animalia
- Phylum: Chordata
- Class: Aves
- Order: Passeriformes
- Family: Fringillidae
- Subfamily: Carduelinae
- Genus: Loxops; Cabanis, 1847

Type species
- Fringilla coccinea Gmelin, 1789

Species
- see text

= Loxops =

Group of Hawaiian forest birds

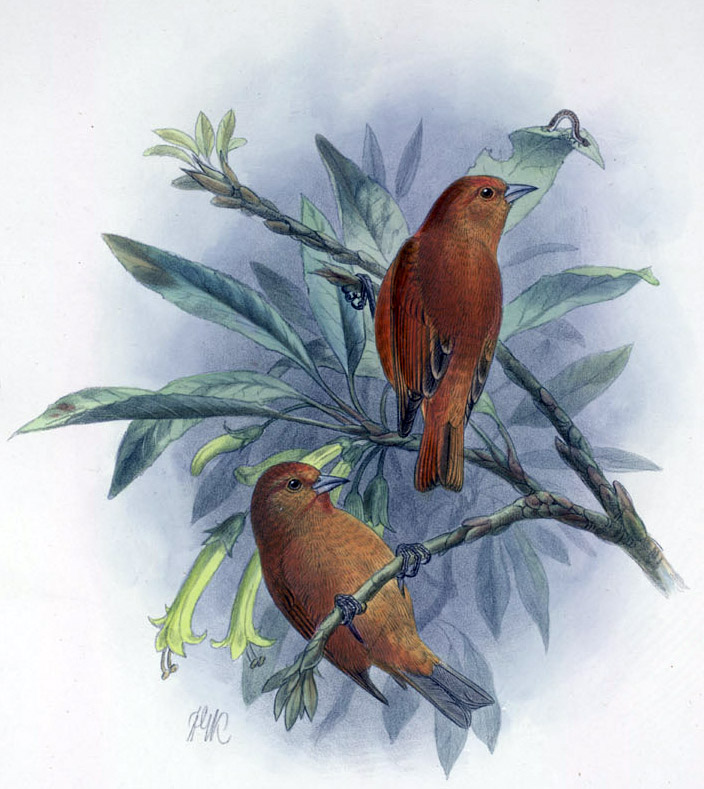
Oʻahu ʻākepa

Loxops is a Hawaiian honeycreeper genus in the finch family, Fringillidae. Most of them are commonly known as ʻākepa.

== Taxonomy ==
There are 5 species in this genus, two of which are recently extinct or possibly extinct:

Genus Loxops – Cabanis, 1847 – five species
Common name	Scientific name and subspecies	Range	Size and ecology	IUCN status and estimated population
Akekeʻe or Kauaʻi ʻākepa	Loxops caeruleirostris (Wilson, SB, 1890)	Kauaʻi	Size: Habitat: Diet:	CR
Hawaiʻi ʻākepa Male Female	Loxops coccineus (Gmelin, 1789)	Hawaiʻi	Size: Habitat: Diet:	EN
Hawaiʻi creeper or alawī Male Female	Loxops mana (Wilson, SB, 1891)	Hawaiʻi.	Size: Habitat: Diet:	EN
†Maui ʻākepa	Loxops ochraceus Rothschild, 1893	Maui	Size: Habitat: Diet:	EX
†Oʻahu ʻākepa	Loxops wolstenholmei (Rothschild,, 1893)	Oʻahu	Size: Habitat: Diet:	EX

Molecular analysis supports the genus diverging from its closest relatives, the Chlorodrepanis ʻamakihis, during the earliest Pleistocene, about 2.47 million years ago. The clade containing both genera is sister to the genus Magumma, which contains the ʻanianiau, from which they diverged during the latest Pliocene, about 2.78 million years ago. Genetic analysis of the extant species supports L. mana as being the most basal extant member of the group, diverging from the other species slightly later in the Pleistocene at about 1.9 million years ago, with L. coccineus and L. caeruleirostris diverging 600,000 years after L. mana. The phylogenetic position of the extinct species is not known.

== Characteristics ==
Loxops average the size of 11 cm. They are considered a finch-like bird that also have a notched tail. Their bills have a cone shape to them and they are pale blue with a dark tip. They are also hard to find in the field. Males typically are a darker shade of green on the top while their belly-side is yellow. They also have a black mask that covers their face up until behind its eye while its forehead, forecrown, and backside is also yellow. Females resemble the same colors as the males, but the colors are muted and less vibrant.

The ʻākepa (Loxops sp.) are a group of one of the smallest Hawaiian forest birds, at four inches long and weighing 10 grams. They are placed in the genus Loxops. Only one of the species in the genus, the Hawaiʻi ʻākepa, is still extant, and is classified as Endangered by the IUCN. Previously considered conspecific, the group was split into distinct species in 2015. Found only in high elevation old growth rainforest, these nonmigratory passerines have rounded heads, black eyes, and black wings and tail. Adult males sport one of the most brilliant orange colors found in any bird, a plumage which takes four years to develop. Females are greenish gray on back, lighter gray on front, with varying amounts of yellow and sometimes pale orange on the breast and belly. Juveniles appear similar to females, though are generally duller in color.

All ʻākepa have an unusual cross-bill. When closed, the upper bill tip slightly overlaps the lower bill tip to one side (this cannot be seen in the field). When opening the bill, as in prying open leaf buds to extract small caterpillars, the bills swing dramatically sideways, and this is easily seen in the hand. Some birds cross one way, and some the other, apparently randomly. The ʻākepa cross-bill operates similarly to that in the North American crossbills (genus Loxia), but is much less obvious when the bill is closed.

Hawaiʻi ʻākepa are usually found from 1,500 to 2,200 meters above sea level. They are non-territorial, and group male displays have often been observed in the beginning of the breeding season. They participate in mixed-species flocks during the non-breeding season. ʻĀkepa is a Hawaiian term meaning "agile", befitting their active foraging at branch tips.

== Breeding ==
The Loxops commonly breed during the months of March and April and possibly during the months of February to June. The nests of the Loxops are found in the ʻōhiʻa trees.

== Diet ==
The group is highly dependent on ʻōhiʻa lehua trees and koa trees for food. The bills are specialized for opening ʻōhiʻa lehua leaf buds in search of small caterpillars. Fretz (2002) suggests that this food source is only found in old-growth Hawaiian forests and could be one factor in ʻākepa population declines. The lehua (or blossom) of the ʻōhiʻa tree provides a source of nectar that this bird consumes occasionally. The koa tree's cracked bark serves as a home for many insects and arthropods that the ʻākepa finds delectable.

== Distribution and habitat ==
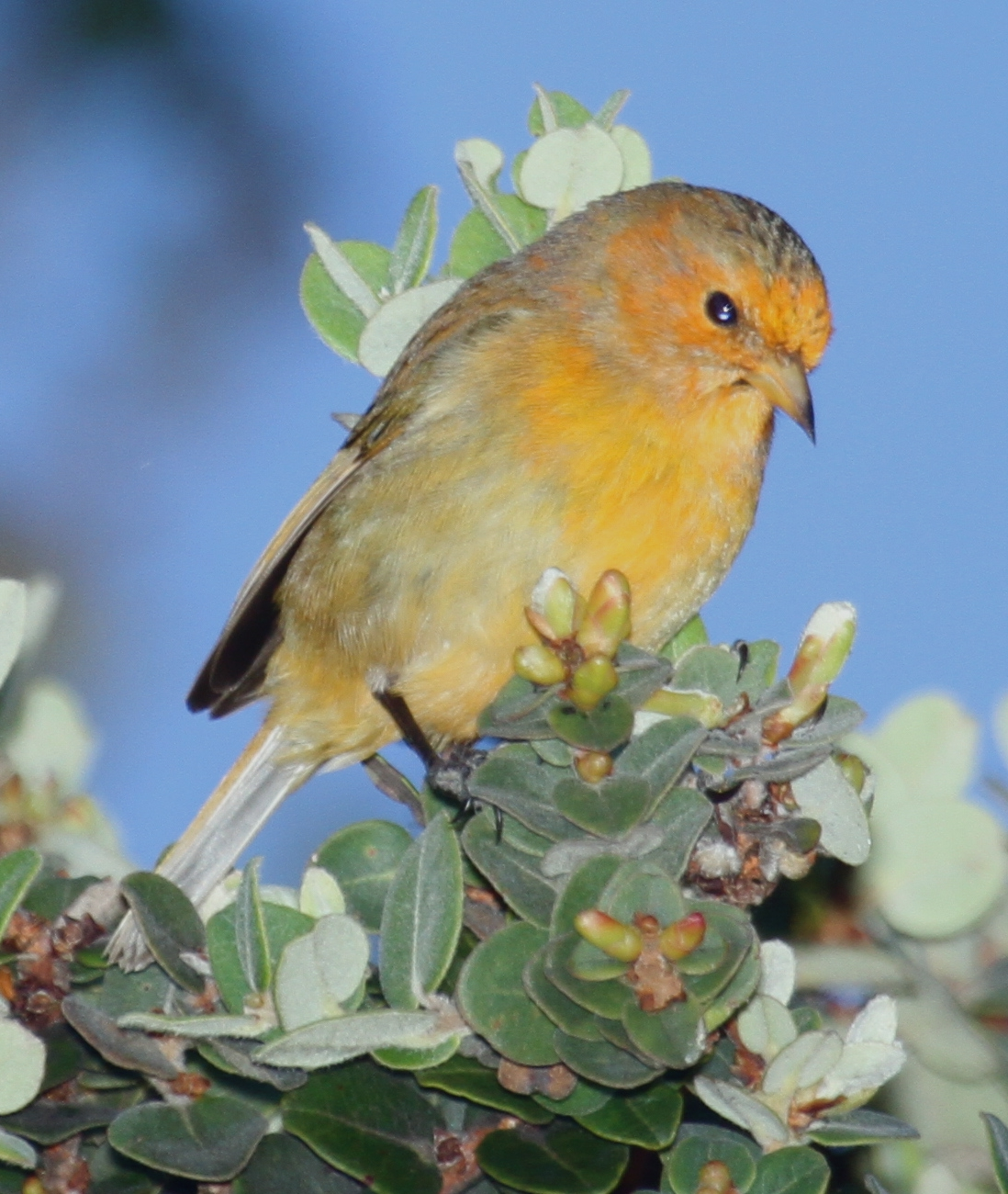
Hawaiʻi ʻākepa on the Big Island

- Loxops coccineus: The Hawaiʻi ʻākepa survives only in two or three locations, all on the island of Hawaii: one population in Hakalau Forest National Wildlife Refuge (on the Hamakua Coast of Mauna Kea), one in the upper forest areas of Kau (in the southern part of the island), and one on the northern slope of Hualālai (perhaps extirpated).
- Loxops wolstenholmei: The Oahu ʻākepa was found in large numbers until the 1890s. Immediately afterward, a sharp drop in its numbers was noted. Many feel that it had disappeared by the 1920s; however, scattered, unconfirmed reports were posted in the 1990s. This subspecies' male was brick red in coloration, while the female was dark gray.
- Loxops ochraceus: The Maui ʻākepa was found on the mountain of Haleakalā in east Maui. This population was detected at low numbers until 1992, when the last sighting was documented. There are still reports of green yellow birds flying in the remote reserve, so there may be individuals remaining, but this is very unlikely as dedicated intensive surveys have failed to confirm any Maui ʻākepa.

== Conservation status ==
Loxops species are considered endangered as their populations have been declining rapidly over the last ten years. Modern developments that take over the environment are threatening the Loxops and reducing their habitat availability in the Kokeʻe region. A lot of the current region of the Loxops is protected by Alakaʻi Wilderness Preserve and, to some extent, by Kokeʻe State Park.
