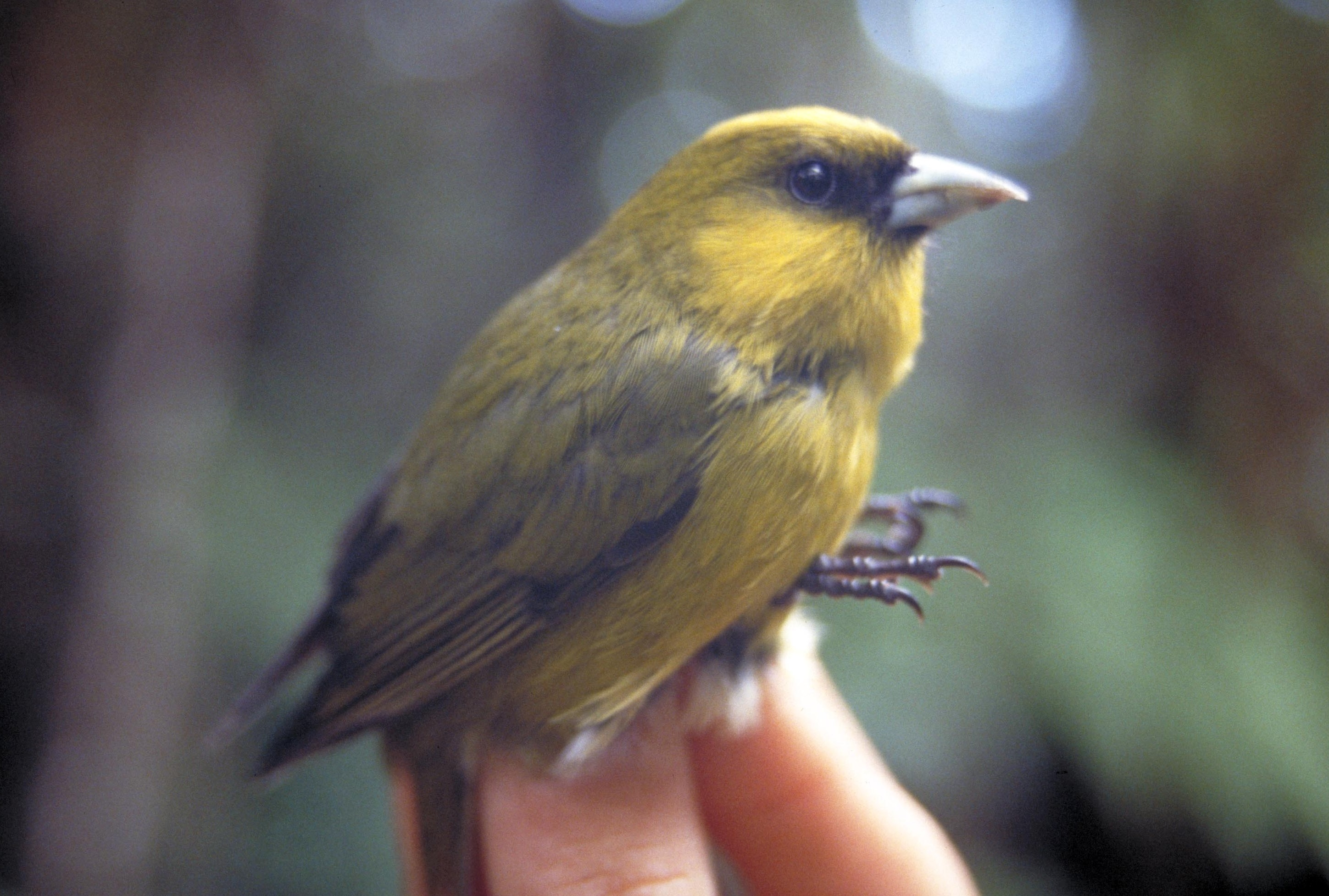

Conservation status
- Critically Endangered (IUCN 3.1)

Scientific classification
- Kingdom: Animalia
- Phylum: Chordata
- Class: Aves
- Order: Passeriformes
- Family: Fringillidae
- Subfamily: Carduelinae
- Genus: Loxops
- Species: L. caeruleirostris

Binomial name
- Loxops caeruleirostris (Wilson, SB, 1890)
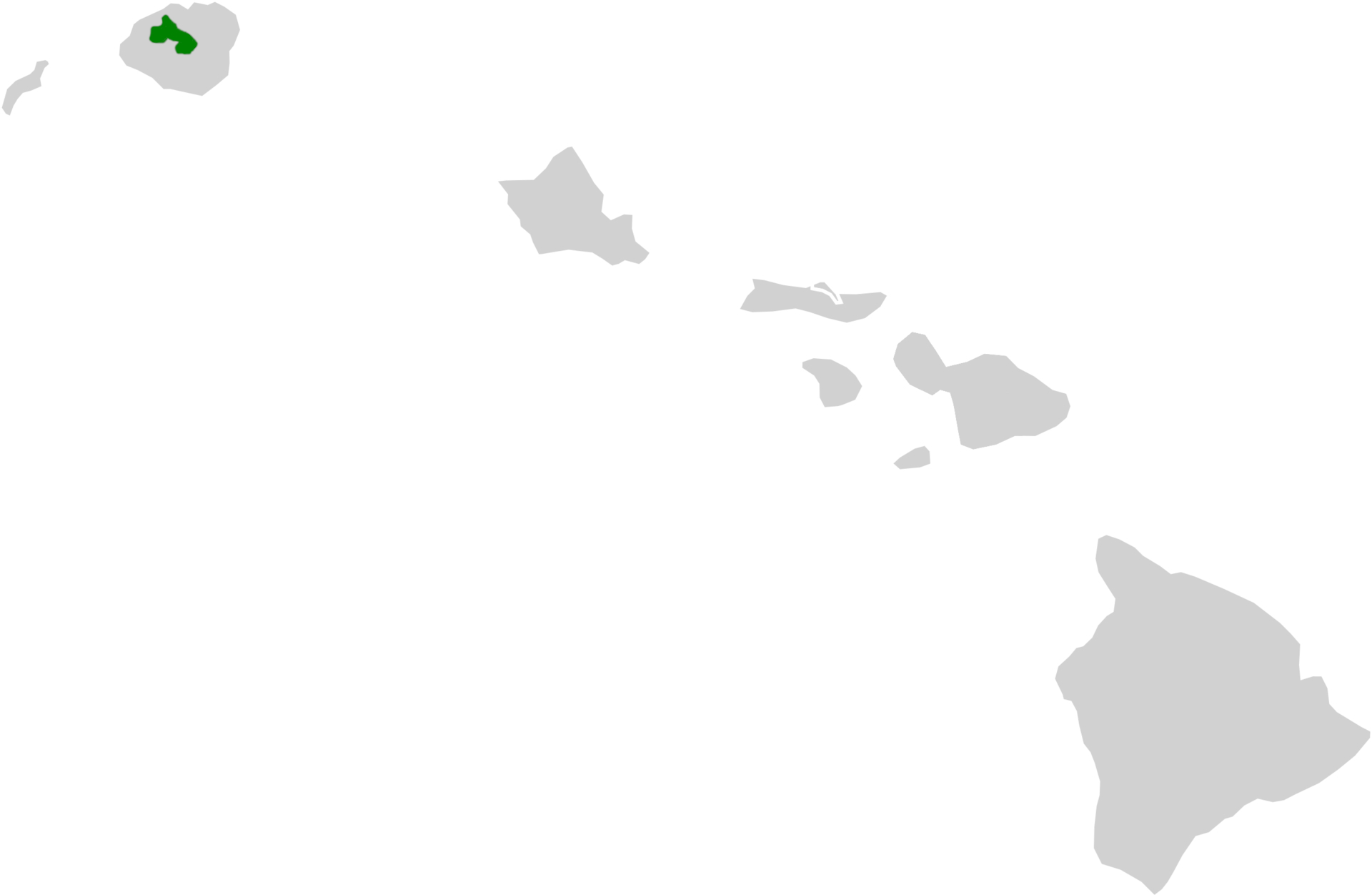

= Akekeʻe =

Species of bird

The akekeʻe (Loxops caeruleirostris) or Kauaʻi ʻākepa is a bird species in the family Fringillidae, where it is placed in the Hawaiian honeycreeper genus Loxops. It is endemic to the island of Kauaʻi where it is found in small numbers in higher elevations. Because of their similar size, shape, and unusual bill, the akekeʻe and the Hawaiʻi ʻākepa (Loxops coccineus) were for some time classified as a single species. This was eventually changed, because of differences in their color, nesting behavior, and calls. The akekeʻe is extremely threatened and is predicted to face imminent extinction if mosquito control efforts on Kauaʻi are not implemented.

== Description and behavior ==
The akekeʻe is a greenish-yellow bird with a black mask around the eye (especially prominent in the male) and a bluish bill, unlike the ʻākepa, which is usually red, canary-yellow or orange, without black, and has a horn-colored bill. The bill-tips are crossed over, though not bent as in the distantly-related crossbills (Loxia). The akekeʻe uses its bill like scissors to cut open buds in search of insects to eat. It also feeds on the nectar of some trees. This bird builds nests primarily of twigs high up in trees, while the ʻākepa uses tree cavities as nest sites.

== Habitat ==
The akekeʻe is currently found only in the Waimea Canyon State Park, Alakaʻi Wilderness Preserve and Kōkeʻe State Park. It has been heading toward extinction because of its lack of tolerance to alteration of its habitat, which is based on mesic and wet forests, especially ʻōhiʻa lehua (Metrosideros polymorpha) trees.

== Threats ==
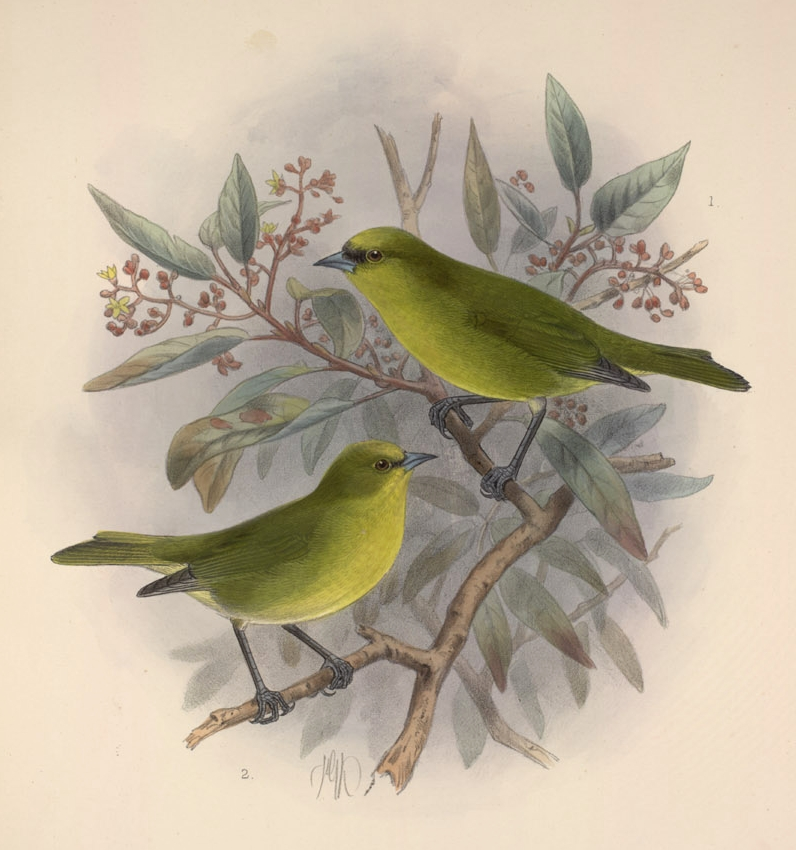
Male above, female below

The akekeʻe is threatened by the introduction of plants like the banana pōka (Passiflora tarminiana), a passionflower vine, that displace the native plants. Feral pigs and feral goats also destroy native growth. The lack of native host plants leads to the decline of the insects on which the akekeʻe feeds. Avian malaria (Plasmodium relictum) and fowlpox transmitted by accidentally introduced mosquitoes continues to affect the akekeʻe, limiting its populations to habitat above 1,100 meters ASL, where mosquitoes do not occur. Forest clearing in different parts of the island of Kauaʻi has caused the loss of habitat for this and many other bird species.

The conservation status for this species was updated to critically endangered in 2008 due to a rapid decrease in population over the preceding decade. The 2012 population was estimated under 5,000 individuals, in 2016 fewer than 1,000, and in 2021 fewer than 638. Of all the highly threatened Hawaiian birds, the akekeʻe has the largest rate of decline, with the population size declining by 21% every year. It is predicted at the current rate, the species will go extinct by 2028. Only 7 captive individuals are known, although due to its complex social interactions, the species does not take well to captivity. The most effective conservation strategy would be landscape-scale control of mosquitoes using Wolbachia.
