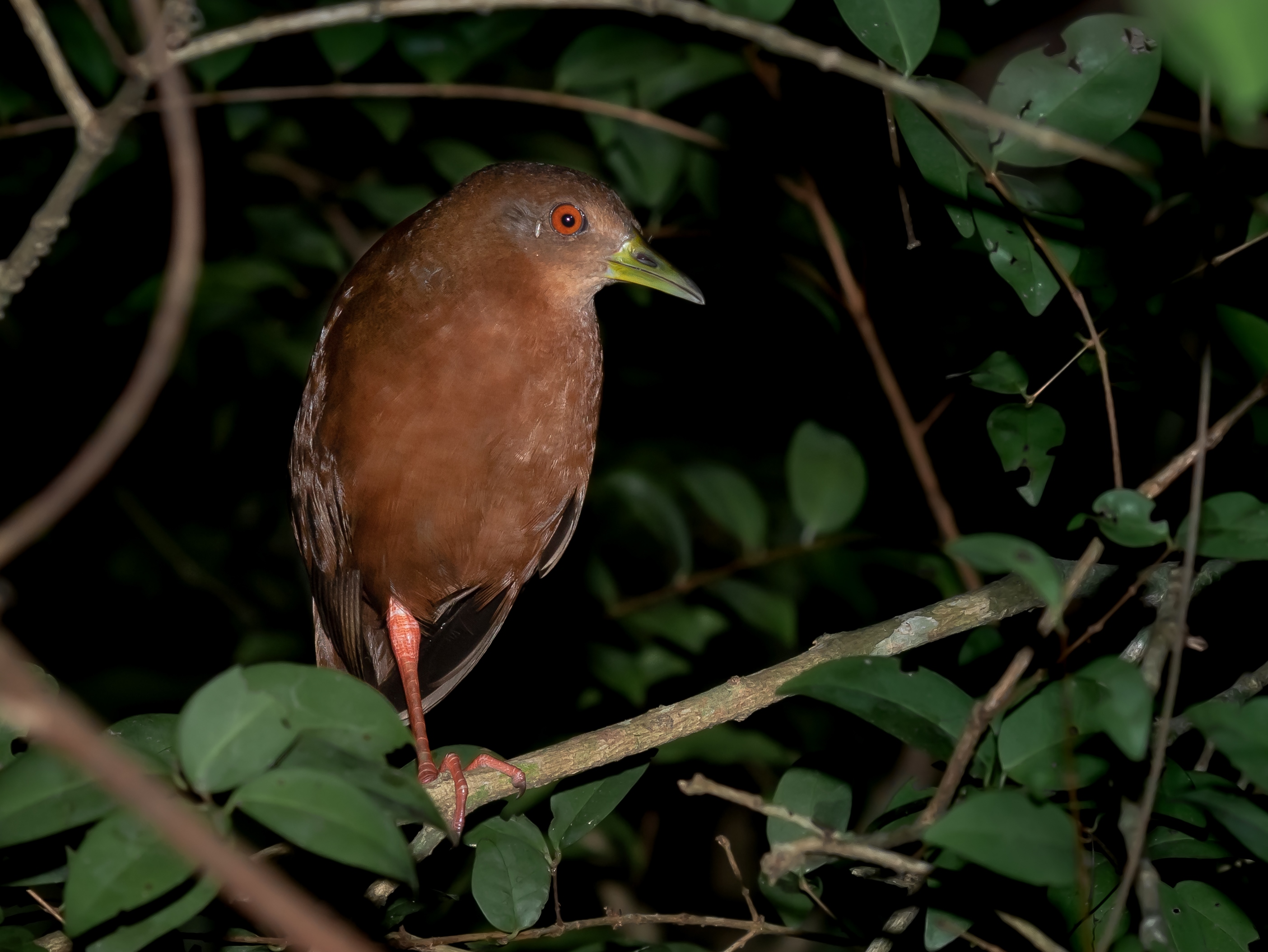
- Amaurolimnas concolor

Conservation status
- Least Concern (IUCN 3.1)

Scientific classification
- Kingdom: Animalia
- Phylum: Chordata
- Class: Aves
- Order: Gruiformes
- Family: Rallidae
- Genus: Amaurolimnas; Sharpe, 1893
- Species: A. concolor

Binomial name
- Amaurolimnas concolor (Gosse, 1847)

Synonyms
- Rallus concolor (Gosse, 1847); Aramides concolor; Laterallus concolor

= Uniform crake =

Species of bird

The uniform crake (Amaurolimnas concolor) is a species of bird in the subfamily Rallinae of the rail, crake, and coot family Rallidae. It is found in Mexico, most of Central America, and in nine South American countries.

== Taxonomy and systematics ==
The uniform crake was first described in genus Rallus and at various times since then placed in genera Aramides and Laterallus before its present Amaurolimnas. It is the only member of that genus and has two extant subspecies, A. c. guatemalensis and A. c. castaneus. The nominate subspecies, the Jamaican wood rail (A. c. concolor), which was endemic to Jamaica, is extinct.

== Description ==
The uniform crake is 20 to 23 cm (7.9 to 9.1 in) long and weighs about 95 to 130 g (3.4 to 4.6 oz). The sexes are alike. They have a medium length yellowish green bill, a red eye, and pinkish red legs and feet. A. c. guatemalensis is the larger of the two living subspecies; it has olivaceous brown upperparts and brown underparts. A. c. castaneus is also olivaceous brown above, but has rufous brown underparts.

== Distribution and habitat ==
The uniform crake has a highly disjunct distribution. Subspecies A. c. guatemalensis is found from Veracruz and Oaxaca in southern Mexico through Central America (except El Salvador) and western Colombia into northwestern Ecuador. A. c. castaneus is found in northern Venezuela, the Guianas, several separate areas of Brazil both inland and coastal, eastern Ecuador and Peru, and locally in Bolivia. It inhabits a variety of wet to almost dry landscapes including wooded swamps, flooded forest, heavily vegetated ravines and streams, and dense vegetation on the edges of secondary forest and cultivated areas. In elevation it ranges from sea level to about 1,000 m (3,300 ft).

== Behavior ==
=== Movement ===
The movements of the uniform crake, if any, are not known.

=== Feeding ===
The uniform crake mostly forages in cover, where it searches leaf litter and other detritus and digs in mud with its bill. Its diet includes earthworms, insects and spiders, small amphibians and lizards, seeds, and berries.

=== Breeding ===
The uniform crake's breeding season is essentially unknown; in Costa Rica it does include July. It is thought to be territorial in the breeding season. One nest in Costa Rica was in a swamp forest near a stream. It was a cup made of leaves in the top of a vine-covered stump and contained four eggs.

=== Vocalization ===
The uniform crake's song is a "series of 6–20 upslurred 'tooee' whistles". Pairs maintain contact with "clear, but not loud, whistled 'tooo' notes". The species' alarm call is "a sharp, nasal 'kek'".

== Status ==
The IUCN has assessed the uniform crake as being of Least Concern. It has a very large range and an unknown population size that is believed to be decreasing. No immediate threats have been identified. Its distribution is spotty even within larger areas of its range. "Because of its secretive habits [the] species is undoubtedly overlooked, and is possibly more widely distributed than currently known, but [is] certainly adversely affected by destruction of its forest habitats."
