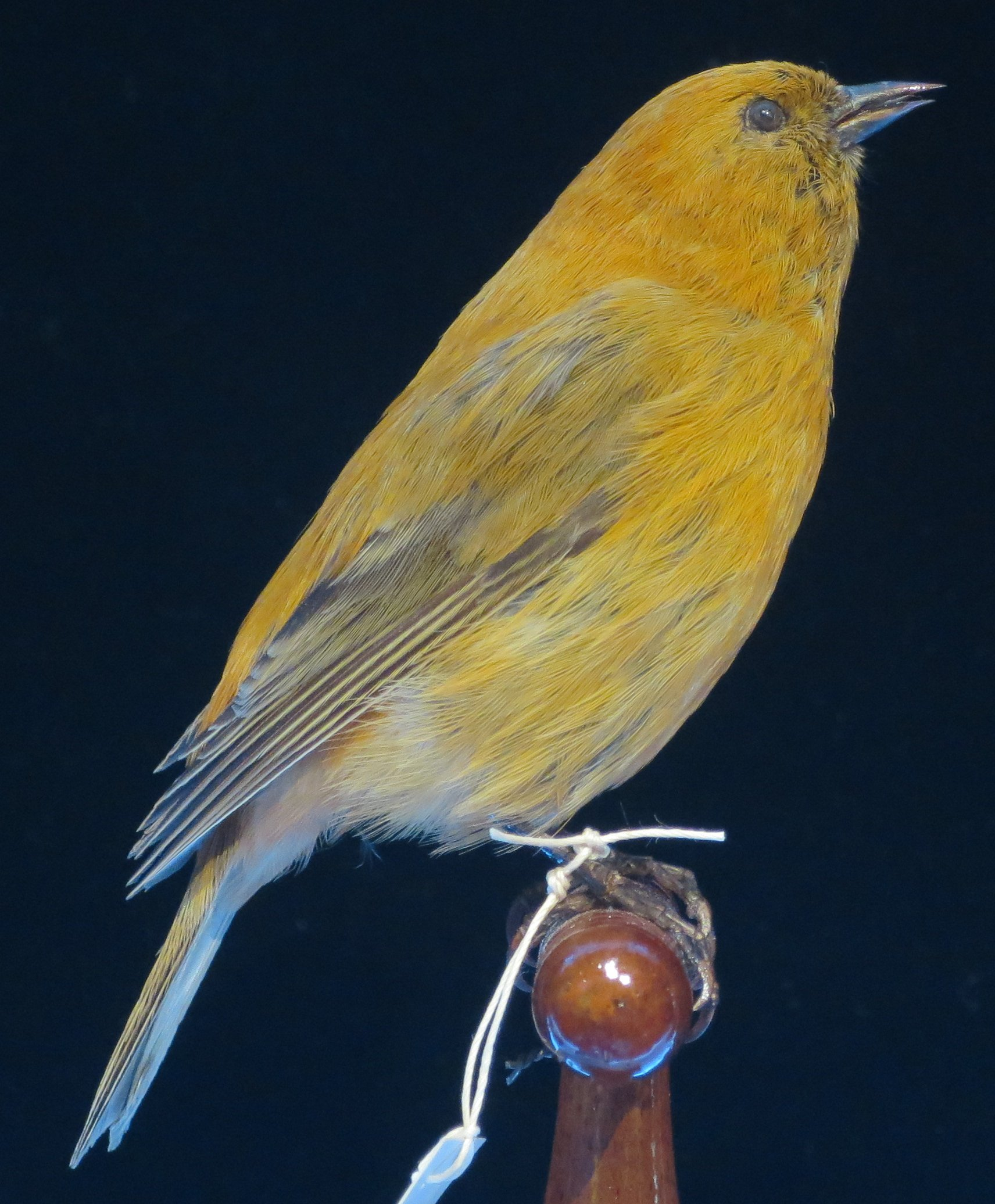
- Specimen at the Bishop Museum

Conservation status
- Extinct (1988) (IUCN 3.1)

Scientific classification
- Kingdom: Animalia
- Phylum: Chordata
- Class: Aves
- Order: Passeriformes
- Family: Fringillidae
- Subfamily: Carduelinae
- Genus: Loxops
- Species: †L. ochraceus

Binomial name
- †Loxops ochraceus Rothschild, 1893
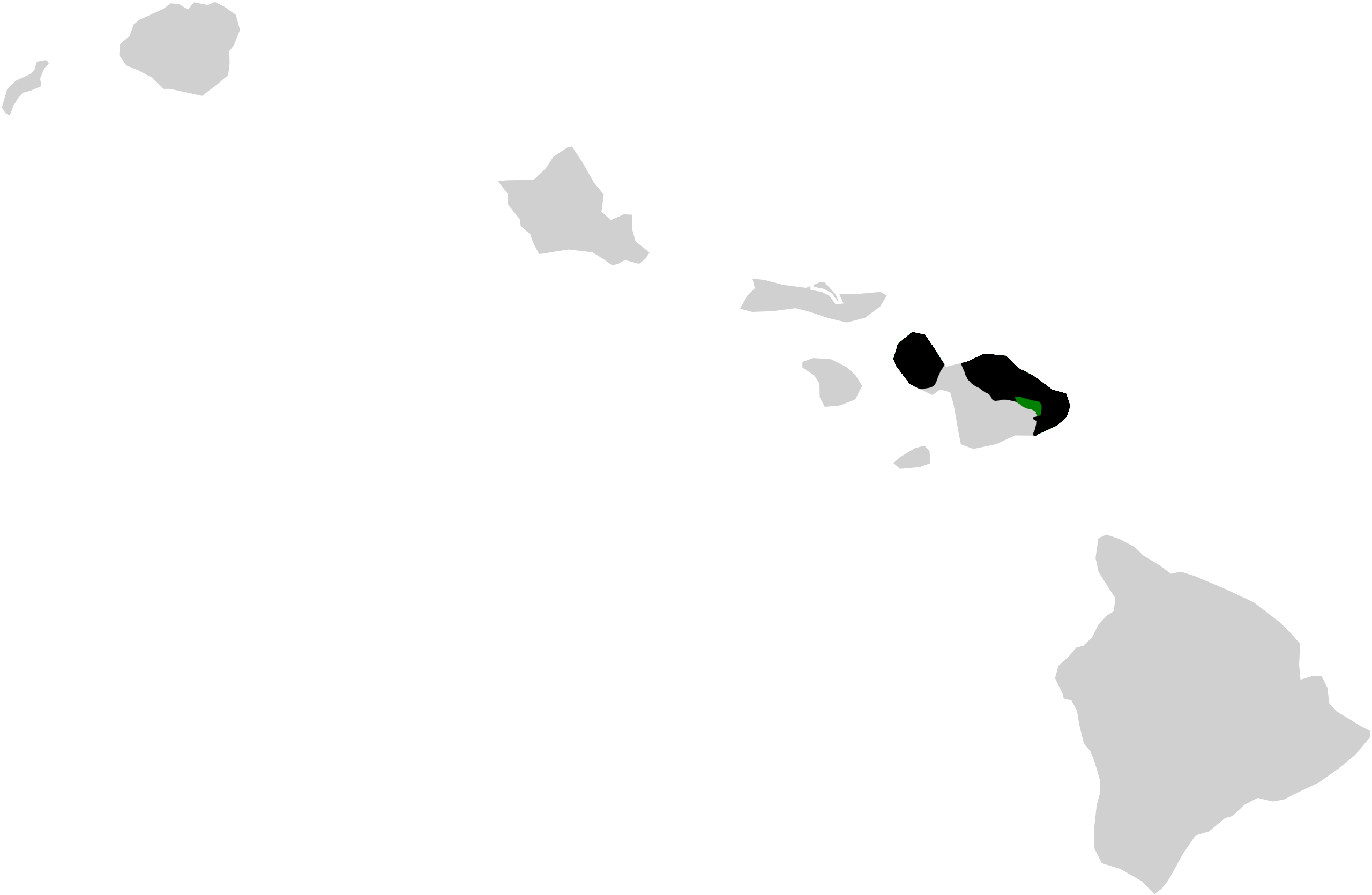
- Black: Extinct; Green: Possible extant range

Synonyms
- Loxops coccineus ochraceus

= Maui ʻākepa =

Species of bird

The Maui ʻākepa (Loxops ochraceus) is an extinct species of ʻākepa that was endemic to Maui in the Hawaiian Islands. It was once common throughout the island, but introduced mosquitoes and other animals to Maui contributed to the declining population, and the bird has been listed as extinct by the IUCN Red List of Threatened Species since 2024. The latest confirmed sighting of this bird was in 1988, and in 2021 the United States Fish and Wildlife Service proposed declaring it extinct. The species was delisted from the Endangered Species Act on October 16, 2023 citing extinction.

== Description ==
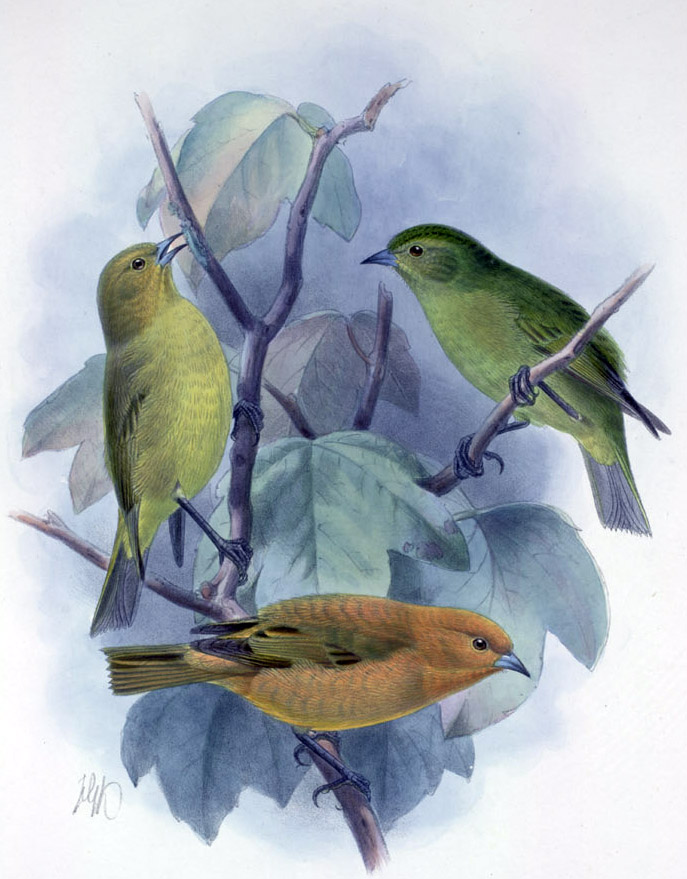
Illustration

It was a four-inch (10 cm) long bird of a dusty green color. It had a small cross bill just like the other Loxops species. Its call was a slight quivering whistle ending with a long trill. It appeared as a small fast moving ball of fluff of green, as it flew from tree to tree.

== Feeding ==
It ate spiders and other invertebrates and drank the nectar of several flowers including the nectar of the ʻōhiʻa, the naio and the lobelia.

== Decline ==
Like many birds in the area, its condition as a species began to deteriorate as new plants replaced those that it was familiar with. Many of these plants included raspberries which literally choked out the native growth and made itself an invincible plant. Those plants had also carried frogs and insects that began to eat the native insects, causing the Maui ʻākepa to lose much of its food supply, the introduced carriers had also brought more problems with them, for example more pests. The Maui ʻākepa was also a frail bird when it came to resistance to diseases like avian flu which was spreading at a rapid pace as the mosquito spread across the island's low elevation forests.

The decline started in the early 20th century when the Maui ʻākepa was still a common bird on much of Maui. However mosquitoes and other animals and plants arrived on ships and colonized the island. The bird became constricted as more of its low elevation forest became colonized by mosquitoes. The upper elevations began to be filled with unusual plants and animals which destroyed the habitat. With much of Maui changed, the birds had a difficult time trying to find places in which they could live.

The idea of captive breeding had not expanded to these songbirds until 1995, but by then the Maui ʻākepa was already gone. In 1988, only one was sighted when a party went on a research trip to study birds that are found in Maui's Hanawi Reserve. Before that there were several other ventures that showed small populations scattered on the reserve. The largest population found in the 1970s contained ten Maui ʻākepa. Today the Maui ʻākepa can only be seen as a specimen in museums. During the 1970s this species was still surviving in small numbers in the East Maui Watershed, and in the reserves that are found in or near the watershed. In 1994, an unconfirmed audio recording of a Maui ʻākepa was taken in the Hanawi Natural Area Reserve during a Rare Bird Search survey. Another unconfirmed audio recording was taken in 1995 in Kipahulu Valley.

On September 29, 2021 the U.S. Fish and Wildlife Service proposed to declare the Maui ʻākepa extinct. The species was delisted from the Endangered Species Act on October 16, 2023 citing extinction.
