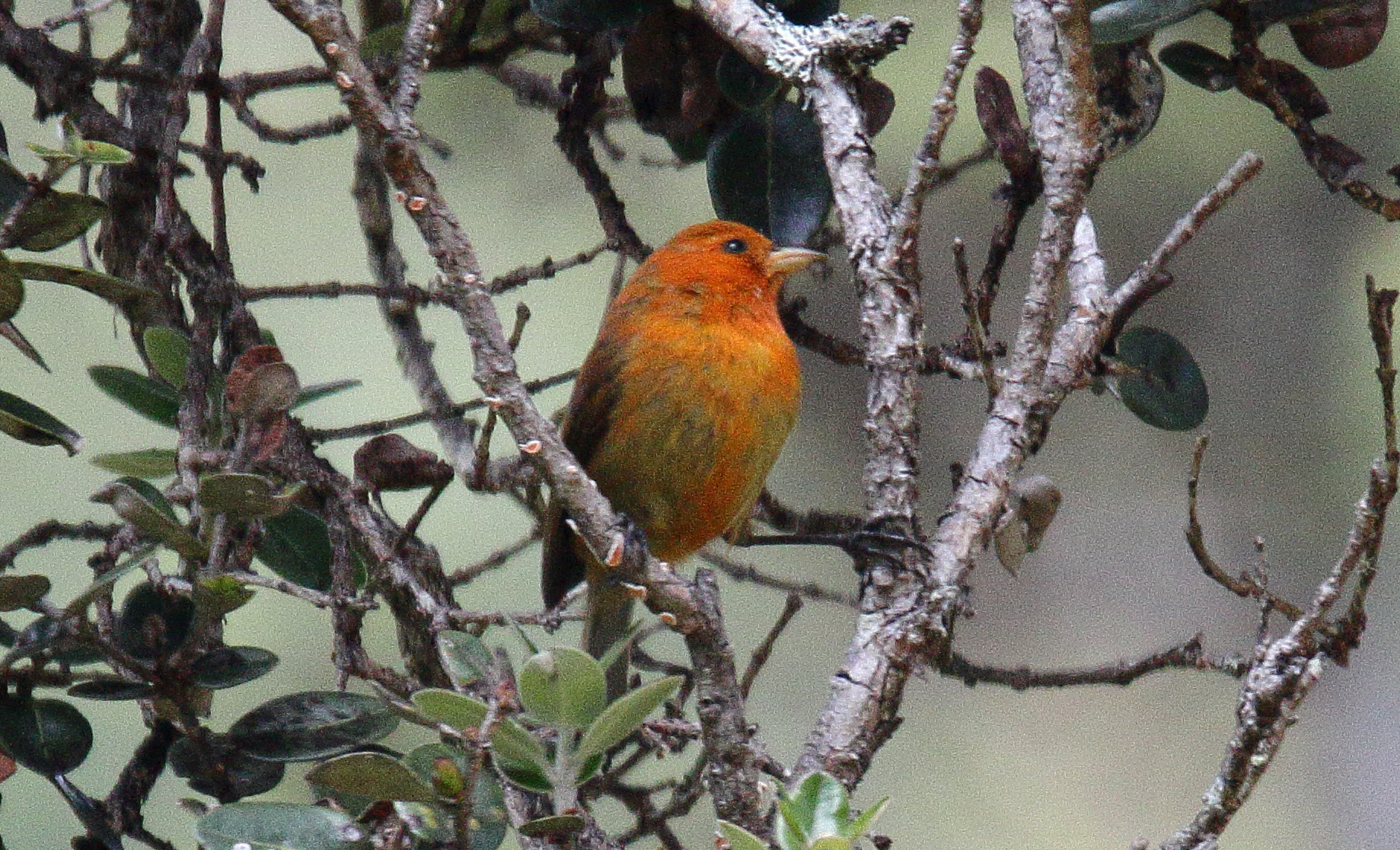

Conservation status
- Endangered (IUCN 3.1)

Scientific classification
- Kingdom: Animalia
- Phylum: Chordata
- Class: Aves
- Order: Passeriformes
- Family: Fringillidae
- Subfamily: Carduelinae
- Genus: Loxops
- Species: L. coccineus

Binomial name
- Loxops coccineus (Gmelin, 1789)
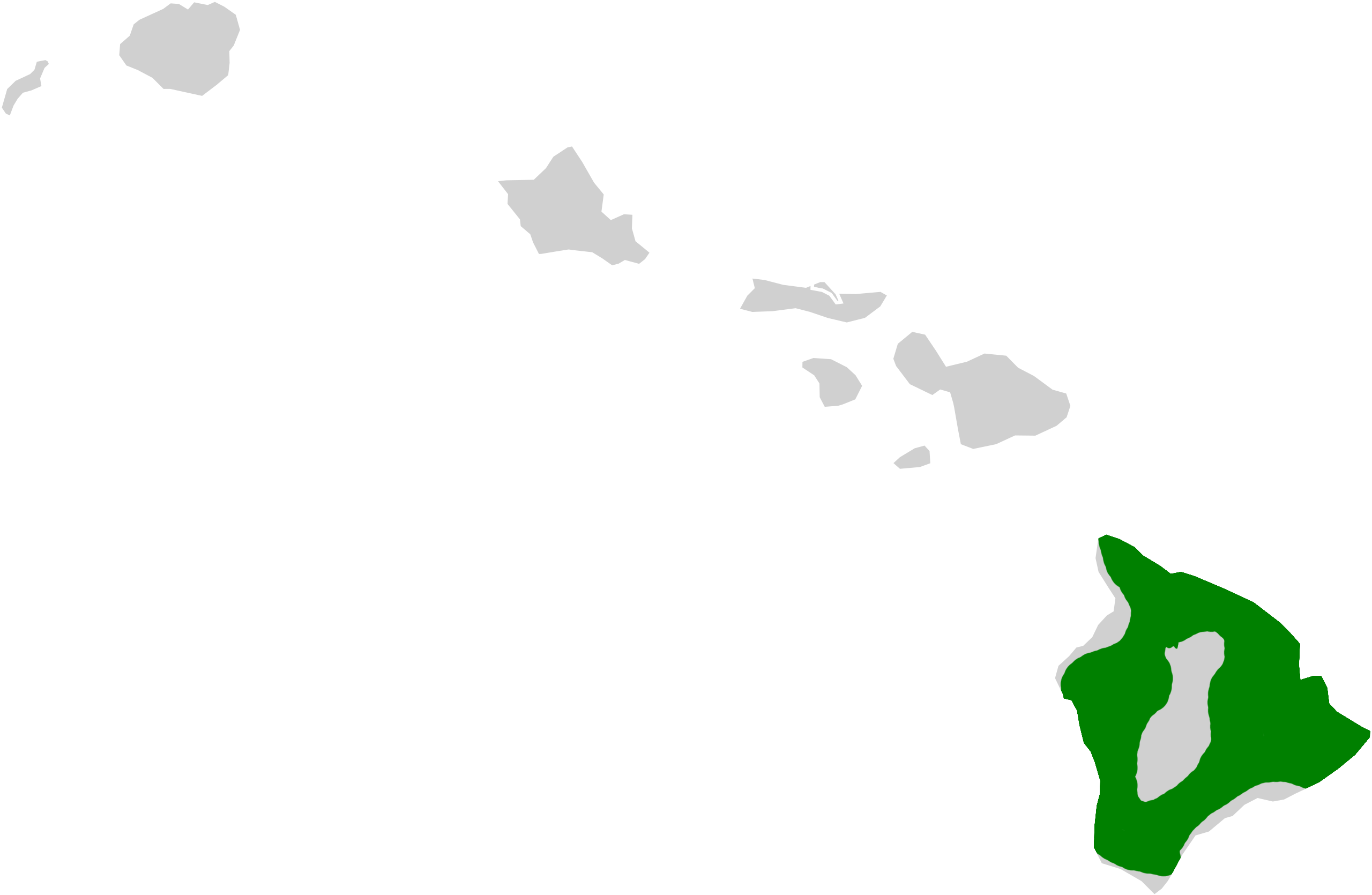
- Range of Loxops coccineus

Synonyms
- Loxops coccineus coccineus

= Hawaiʻi ʻākepa =

Species of bird

The Hawaiʻi ʻākepa (Loxops coccineus coccineus) is an endangered ʻākepa native to Hawaiʻi in the Hawaiian Islands. The three ʻākepa species were considered monotypic before being split by the NACC of the AOU in 2015. The Hawaiʻi ʻākepa was first collected by western science during Captain James Cook's third voyage around the world. Several specimens were collected, as well as feather leis (necklaces resembling strings of flowers) constructed by Hawaiian artisans. The specimens were classified when brought back to England several years later. The Latin name of the bird, Loxops coccineus, means "crossed" (Loxops) and "red" (coccineus).

== Description ==
It is a four-inch (10 cm) long bird of a dusty green color. Males are bright orange when adults at there years of age, but more dull and brown when juveniles. Females are gray green with varying amounts of a breast band of yellow. It has a small cross bill just like the other Loxops species. Its call is a slight quivering whistle ending with a long trill. Audio of the call can be heard at this citation.

== Distribution and habitat ==
The Hawaiʻi ʻākepa survives only in two or three locations, all on the island of Hawaii: one population in Hakalau Forest National Wildlife Refuge (on the Hamakua Coast of Mauna Kea), one in the upper forest areas of Kaʻū (in the southern part of the island), and one on the northern slope of Hualālai (perhaps extirpated). As of 2000, about 14,000 Hawaiʻi ʻākepa remained. They were listed as an endangered species in 1975.

== Feeding ==
It eats spiders and other invertebrates and drinks the nectar of several flowers including the nectar of the ʻōhiʻa, the naio and the lobelia.

== Breeding ==
These birds have a breeding season in spring. The Hawaii ʻākepa is the only obligate cavity-nester in Hawaii. There are no cavity-making birds in Hawaii (another honeycreeper, the ʻakiapōlāʻau, drills small holes and excavates bark, but does not make holes large enough for ʻākepa nests). Thus, the ʻākepa must find naturally occurring cavities in the trunks and branches. Such cavities are generally found only in very large, old trees, making the ʻākepa an old-growth obligate. Large courtship groups have been observed during the breeding season, which is curious because this species makes permanent bonds. Another anomaly is the fact that for such a small bird, it does not lay many eggs—usually one or two, instead of the three to five of other similarly sized species.

=== Disease ===
Surviving ʻākepa live only in old growth forest above 1,200 metres (3,937 ft) elevation. This is a sign that avian malaria and avian pox have played a role in killing off populations of ʻākepa at lower elevations. These introduced diseases are implicated in more than 20 bird extinctions in Hawaii since 1826, when the first mosquito species (southern house mosquito, Culex quinquefasciatus) was introduced to the islands. Disease continues to be a threat and could result in extinction of the ʻākepa if Hawaiian climate continues to warm (or if new bird diseases or mosquito species are allowed to invade the islands).

=== Old growth deterioration ===
Due to their need for tree cavities, ʻākepa rely on old-growth ʻōhiʻa and koa forests for nesting. Although the largest populations of ʻākepa live within protected lands, large trees appear to be falling faster than they are replaced. It is unclear how management can deal with this in the medium-term, except by use of artificial nest boxes. Past experiments with nest boxes (Freed et al., 1987) have shown that birds will occasionally use them, with high nesting success. There is no ongoing research or use of nest boxes for ʻākepa as of 2010.
