= Big Island National Wildlife Refuge Complex =

Coordinates: 19.698561°N 155.095427°W

The Big Island National Wildlife Refuge Complex is a protected wildlife refuge administered by the U.S. Fish and Wildlife Service located on Hawaiʻi Island (commonly known as the Big Island) in the state of Hawaii. It consists of Hakalau Forest on the windward side of Mauna Kea and Kona Forest on the western side of Mauna Loa.

== Units ==
- Hakalau Forest National Wildlife Refuge
