= Cyprus dipper =

Conservation status
- Extinct (1950)

Scientific classification
- Kingdom: Animalia
- Phylum: Chordata
- Class: Aves
- Order: Passeriformes
- Family: Cinclidae
- Genus: Cinclus
- Species: C. cinclus
- Subspecies: †C. c. olympicus

Trinomial name
- †Cinclus cinclus olympicus (Madarász, 1903)

Extinct subspecies of bird

The Cyprus dipper (Cinclus cinclus olympicus) is an extinct subspecies of white-throated dipper endemic to Cyprus. It was a stream wader in the montane forests of the island. This insectivorous bird was last observed c. 1950 on Cyprus.

C. c. olympicus is recognized as a subspecies of C. cinclus by several taxonomic authorities, including the Clements, Handbook of the Birds of the World, and International Ornithological Congress taxonomies. There was some dispute among earlier taxonomists whether this subspecies was sufficiently different enough from C. c. orientalis to warrant its own subspecies, although these concerns came after the examination of small samples (e.g., 3 individuals by Vaurie).

White the exact cause of the Cyprus dipper's extinction is unknown, it may have been adversely affected by the antimalarial pesticide DDT, which can be directly toxic to birds and cause thinner, more fragile eggshells. The extant members of its species are threatened by pollution and water impoundment for dams and irrigation systems.

== See also ==
- List of extinct bird species since 1500
- List of extinct species
- List of European animals extinct in the Holocene
