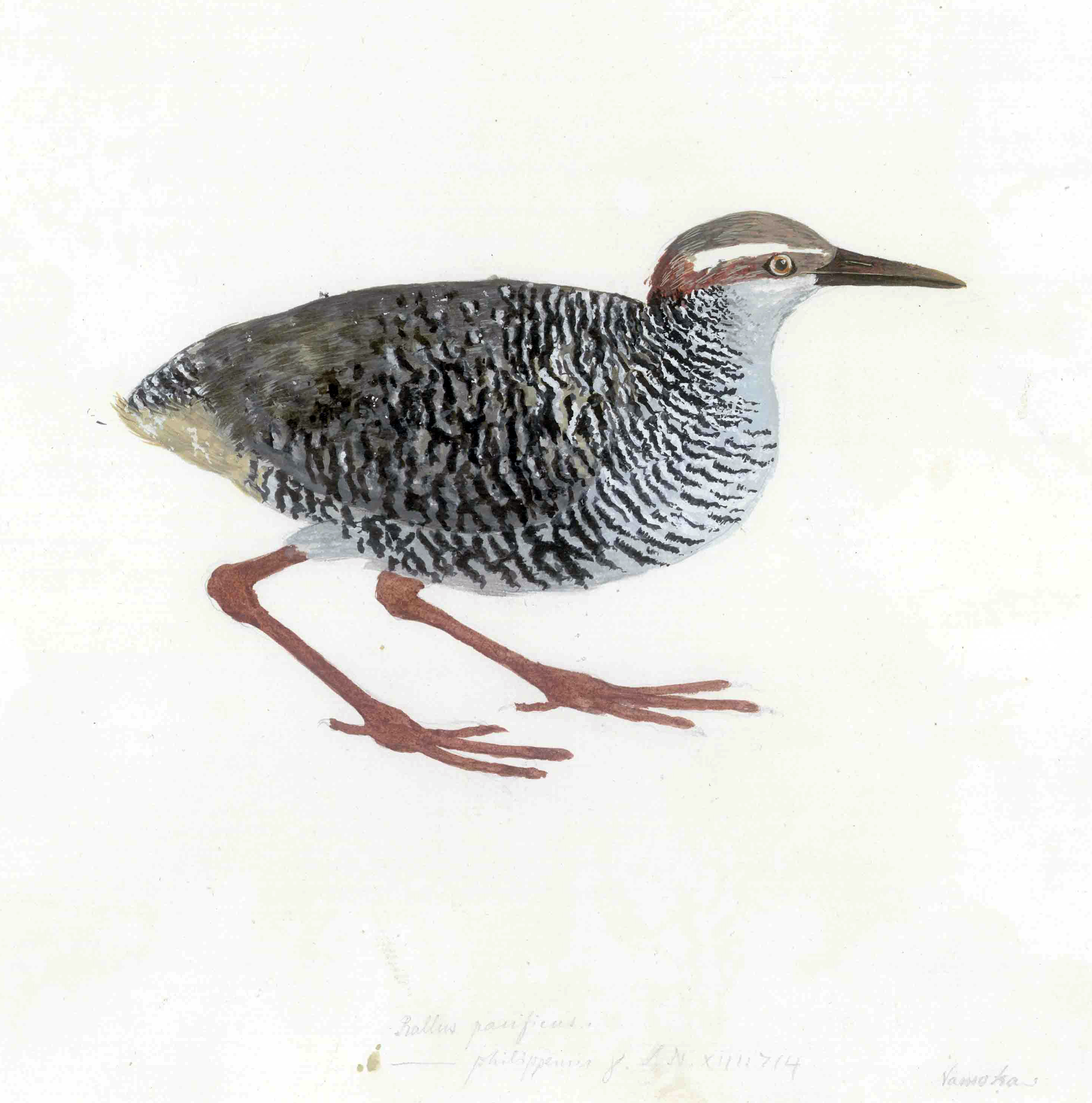
- Watercolour painting by Georg Forster

Conservation status
- Extinct (IUCN 3.1)

Scientific classification
- Kingdom: Animalia
- Phylum: Chordata
- Class: Aves
- Order: Gruiformes
- Family: Rallidae
- Genus: Gallirallus
- Species: †G. hypoleucus

Binomial name
- †Gallirallus hypoleucus (Finsch & Hartlaub, 1867)

Synonyms
- Rallus hypoleucus

= Tongatapu rail =

Tongatapu rail Temporal range: Late Holocene

Extinct species of bird

The Tongatapu rail (Gallirallus hypoleucus) is an extinct species of bird in the family Rallidae. It was apparently native to the island of Tongatapu in the Kingdom of Tonga, in Polynesia in the south-west Pacific Ocean. It is known only from brief descriptions of a specimen, now lost, collected from Tongatapu in 1777 in the course of James Cook's third voyage to the Pacific, and from a contemporary illustration by Georg Forster.
