= Jamaican wood rail =

Conservation status
- Extinct (1881) (IUCN 3.1)

Scientific classification
- Kingdom: Animalia
- Phylum: Chordata
- Class: Aves
- Order: Gruiformes
- Family: Rallidae
- Genus: Amaurolimnas
- Species: A. concolor
- Subspecies: †A. c. concolor

Trinomial name
- †Amaurolimnas concolor concolor (P. H. Gosse, 1847)

Subspecies of bird

The Jamaican wood rail (Amaurolimnas concolor concolor), also called the Jamaican uniform rail, is an extinct subspecies of the uniform crake found on Jamaica. Extinct since 1881, it is the nominate subspecies of the bird.

== Appearance ==
The Jamaican wood rail was a reddish-brown bird some 10 inches in length.

== Ecology ==
Although capable of flight, the wood rail was primarily a terrestrial bird, preferring to run to escape predators. It was originally widespread on the island, inhabiting swamps, jungle undergrowth and streambeds, to fairly high altitudes.

== Extinction ==
Already rare and threatened by rats and cats, the Jamaican wood rail was ultimately driven to extinction shortly after the introduction of small Indian mongooses to Jamaica in 1872. The last specimens of the bird were collected in 1881.
