= Mangarevan whistler =

Conservation status
- Extinct (Late 19th century?) (IUCN 3.1)

Scientific classification
- Kingdom: Animalia
- Phylum: Chordata
- Class: Aves
- Order: Passeriformes
- Family: Pachycephalidae
- Genus: Pachycephala
- Species: †P. gambierana

Binomial name
- †Pachycephala gambierana Gray, 1843 (?)

Synonyms
- Acrocephalus gambieranus Cibois et al., 2011; Eopsaltria gambieranus (Lesson, 1844); Lanius gambieranus Lesson, 1844

Extinct species of whistler bird

The mangarevan whistler (?Pachycephala gambierana) is a dubious species of extinct bird in the family Pachycephalidae that was once found in Mangareva in French Polynesia.

== Discovery and extinction ==
It is a mysterious bird with no known specimens existing today. A single specimen was collected before 1840 by Pierre Adolphe Lesson during French expeditions to the island of Mangareva, French Polynesia.

The holotype was in the collection of Abeillé de Bordeaux, and a painting of the specimen was prepared by Charles Thélot de Rochefort, with both the painting and the specimen being lost today. René Lesson was the only person to study the specimen before it was lost, having done so in 1844.

=== Extinction ===
The Mangarevan whistler was native to the island of Mangareva and it is believed to have gone extinct during the late 19th century, almost certainly after 1840. A 1922 expedition to Mangareva was unable to locate the species.

== Classification ==
The mangarevan whistler is tentatively classified as a species of Pachycephala. It was initially described as a shrike known as Lanius gambieranus by Lesson (1844), then it was classified as an Eopsaltria "robin", and ?P. gambierana may actually instead be an Acrocephalus warbler, potentially being synonymous with Acrocephalus astrolabii.
