= Pierre Adolphe Lesson =

French botanist

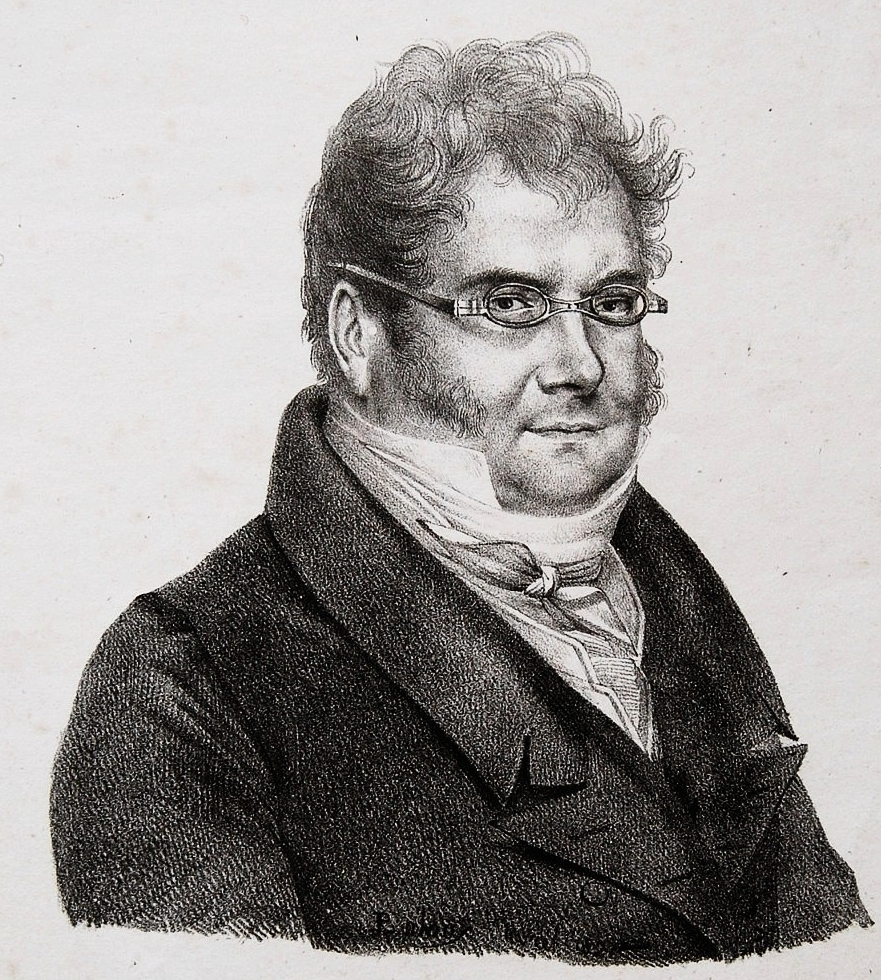
- Adolphe Pierre Lesson
- Born: 24 May 1805; Rochefort, France
- Died: 16 May 1888 (aged 82); Rochefort, France
- Other name: Pierre-Adolphe Lesson
- Relatives: René Lesson (brother)
- Scientific career
- Fields: botanist
- Author abbrev. (botany): A.Lesson

Pierre Adolphe Lesson (1805–1888), also as Pierre-Adolphe Lesson, was a French botanist. The standard author abbreviation A.Lesson is used to indicate this person as the author when citing a botanical name.

== Select publications by Lesson ==
- Lesson, A.; Richard, A. (1832). Tastu, J. (ed.). Voyage de découvertes de l'Astrolabe, exécuté par ordre du Roi pendant les années 1826-1827-1828-1829 sous le commandement de M. J. Dumont d'Urville. Botanique [Voyage of Discovery of the Astrolabe, executed by order of the King during the years 1826-1827-1828-1829 under the command of Mr. J. Dumont of Urville. Botany] (in French). Paris.
- Lesson, A. (1844). Mercier; Devois (eds.). Voyage aux îles de Mangareva [Travel to the Mangareva Islands] (in French). Rochefort.
- Lesson, A. (1876). Triaud; Guy (eds.). Notes sur l'identité de la calenture et du delirium tremens [Notes on the identity of the caldera and delirium tremens] (in French). Rochefort.
- Lesson, A. (1876). "Vanikoro et ses habitants" [Vanikoro and its inhabitants]. Revue d'Anthropologie (in French). 5: 252–272.
- Lesson, A. (1883). Leroux, Ernest (ed.). Les Polynésiens, leur origine, leurs migrations, leur langage [The Polynesians, their origin, their migrations, their language] (in French). Paris.
- Lesson, A. (1883). "Légendes géographiques des îles Marquises" [Geographical legends of the Marquesas Islands]. Bulletin de la Société de Géographie de Rochefort (in French). 5: 3–29.
- Lesson, A. (1884). Clouzot (ed.). Légendes des îles Hawaii tirées de Fornander et commentées avec une réponse à M. de Quatrefages [Legends of the Hawaiian Islands taken from Fornander and commented with a response to M. de Quatrefages] (PDF) (in French). Niort.
