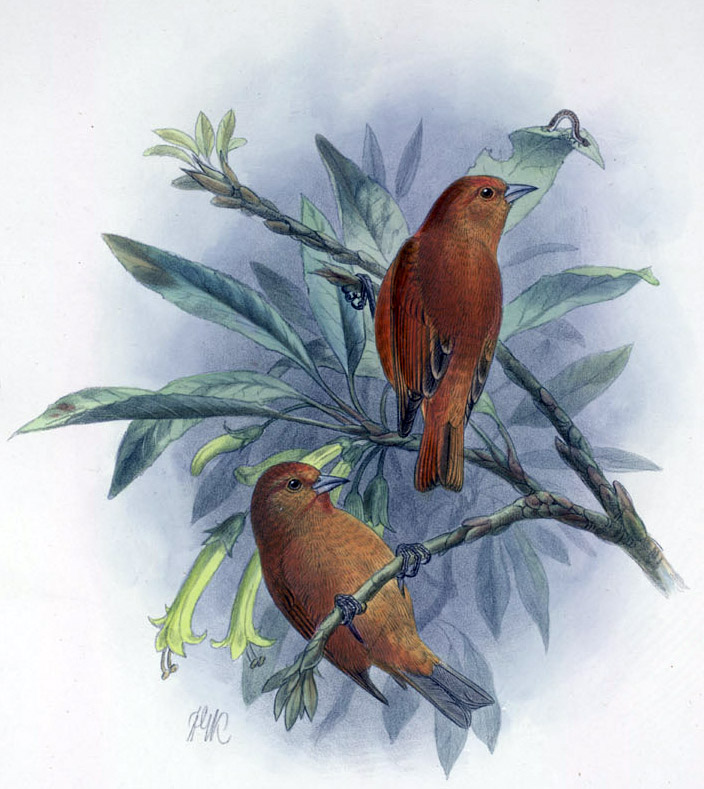

Conservation status
- Extinct (1900s) (IUCN 3.1)

Scientific classification
- Kingdom: Animalia
- Phylum: Chordata
- Class: Aves
- Order: Passeriformes
- Family: Fringillidae
- Subfamily: Carduelinae
- Genus: Loxops
- Species: †L. wolstenholmei

Binomial name
- †Loxops wolstenholmei Rothschild, 1893

Synonyms
- Fringilla rufa Bloxam, 1827 (preoccupied); Loxops coccineus wolstenholmei Rothschild, 1895

= Oʻahu ʻākepa =

Extinct species of bird

The Oʻahu ʻākepa (Loxops wolstenholmei) is an extinct species of ʻākepa that was endemic to the island of Oahu. It was commonly sighted throughout the 19th century. This brick red Hawaiian honeycreeper was found in the mountain peaks in densely forested areas. The females were mostly gray with a tinge of green. The birds had a slight crossbill just like the other Loxops species. It used its crossbill to open up buds in search for nectar and insects for it to eat. Its most common haunts were the ʻōhiʻa and koa forests that were filled with the many flowers and insects that this species liked to eat. The Oʻahu ʻākepa is one of three different species of ʻākepa that were spread by possible weather and migration. The movement of the species stopped causing the species to break into four branches. The first branch was the Hawaiian ʻākepa, a scarlet- red bird that lives only on the Big Island and may be the ancestor of the genus Loxops. Next is the Maui ʻākepa, which was found as fossils on all the islands of Maui Nui, but was historically seen on Maui. It is a grayish-orange bird that was the first of the ʻākepa species to disappear. Then came the Oʻahu ʻākepa, which is a brick-red color and was seen till around the 1900s when it became extinct. The last branch was the akeke‘e, a green bird that is only found on the island of Kauaʻi.
