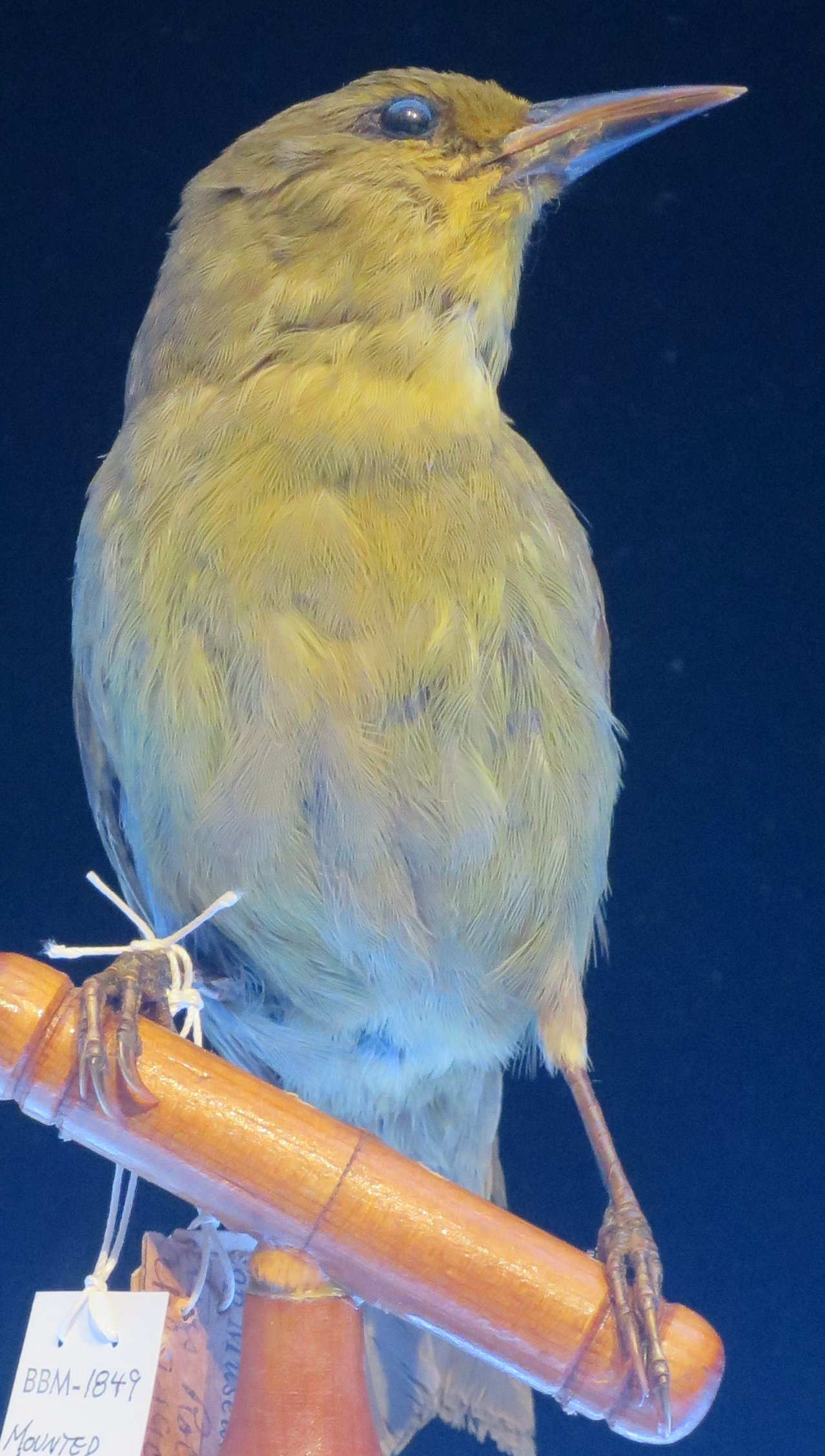
- Specimen at the Bishop Museum

Conservation status
- Extinct (1901) (IUCN 3.1)

Scientific classification
- Kingdom: Animalia
- Phylum: Chordata
- Class: Aves
- Order: Passeriformes
- Family: Fringillidae
- Subfamily: Carduelinae
- Genus: †Viridonia; Rothschild, 1892
- Species: †V. sagittirostris

Binomial name
- †Viridonia sagittirostris Rothschild, 1892

Synonyms
- Hemignathus sagittirostris (Rothschild, 1892)

= Greater ʻamakihi =

Extinct species of bird

The greater ʻamakihi (Viridonia sagittirostris) is an extinct species of Hawaiian honeycreeper in the subfamily Carduelinae of the family Fringillidae.

It was endemic to the Island of Hawaii. The species was last recorded in 1901.

== Description ==
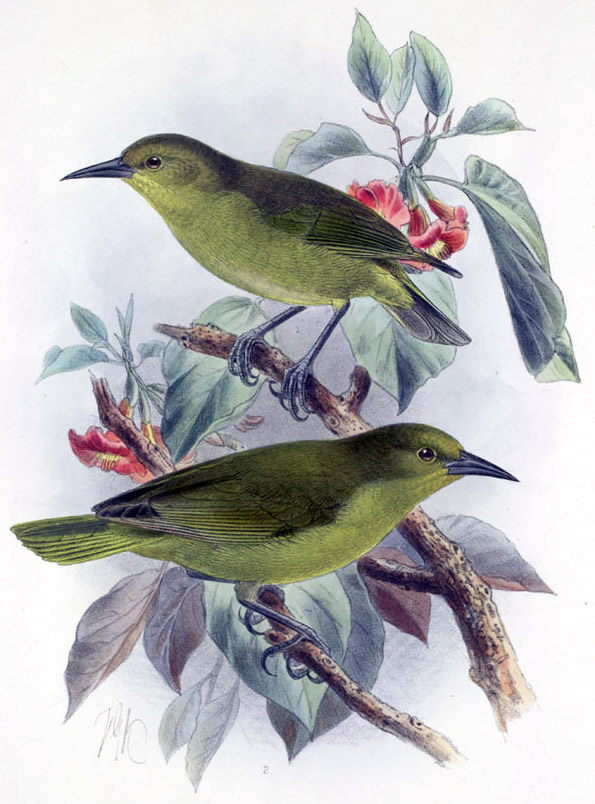
Illustration by John Gerrard Keulemans.

The greater ʻamakihi, also known as the green solitaire while it was extant, was the largest recent ʻamakihi. It was a brownish winged bird with a yellow body ending with a notched tail, and a whitish pointed beak. It was six inches long and it had blackish brown legs. (At least one naturalist of the era, however, noted, "The beautiful blue of the legs is retained in the skin for only a few days and then fades almost to black.")

The major difference between it and its relative was that its bill was white and the fact that the bird was six inches in comparison to the four-inch Hawaiʻi ʻamakihi.

=== Ecology ===
It lived in a small tract of forest where it crept through the vines and trees for insects as part of its diet. It was not discovered until the last quarter of the 19th century by Henry Palmer, who collected in the islands between 1890 and 1893, and it was apparently unknown to natives. It was thought to have been seen sipping nectar from o'hia trees. It was thought to have gone extinct when the only population was killed when the land they lived on was turned into a sugarcane plantation. After the land around Hilo was cleared in 1901, the bird was never spotted again.

Somewhat ironically, large-scale plantations like the one established on the greater ʻamakihi's territory were eventually abandoned. The species appears not to have been widespread, and was rarely found.

== See also ==
- Hawaiian honeycreepers
- Extinct birds of Hawaii
