= ʻAmakihi =

ʻamakihi may refer to the following species of bird:

- Hawaiʻi ʻamakihi or common ʻamakihi (Chlorodrepanis virens)
- Oʻahu ʻamakihi (Chlorodrepanis flavus)
- Kauaʻi ʻamakihi (Chlorodrepanis kauaiensis)
- Greater ʻamakihi (Viridonia sagittirostris)
