= Hakalau Forest National Wildlife Refuge =

Protected area on the Big Island of Hawaiʻi, US

- IUCN category IV (habitat/species management area)
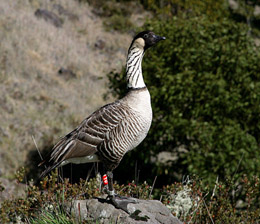
- Nene - Hakalau Forest NWR.

- Location within Hawaii
- Location: Island of Hawaiʻi
- Nearest city: Hilo, Hawaiʻi
- Coordinates: 19°51′56″N 155°20′10″W
- Area: 38,047 acres (15,397 ha)
- Established: 1985
- Governing body: United States Fish & Wildlife Service
- Website: Hakalau Forest National Wildlife Refuge

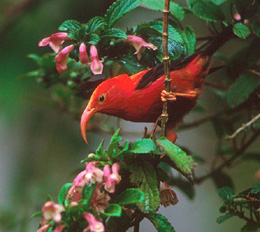
'I'iwi on native mint - Hakalau Forest NWR.

Hakalau Forest National Wildlife Refuge is a protected area on the Big Island of Hawaiʻi. It is one of two units, along with the Kona Forest National Wildlife Refuge that is managed as part of the Big Island National Wildlife Refuge Complex. Access to the Kona Forest is restricted since it contains several endangered species.

== Description ==
Hakalau Forest NWR contains some of the finest remaining stands of native montane wet forest in Hawaiʻi. The slopes below 4,000 ft (1,200 m) feet receive very high rainfall - 250 in (6,400 mm) annually. Bogs, fern patches, and scrubby forest dominate this area, which is dissected by numerous deep gulches. Rainfall decreases to about 150 in (3,800 mm) at elevations above 4,500 ft (1,400 m), where majestic koa (Acacia koa) and red-blossomed ʻōhiʻa lehua (Metrosideros polymorpha) trees form a closed-canopy forest. Further upslope, above 6,000 ft (1,800 m), rainfall decreases to 100 in (2,500 mm) or less and native forest merges into abandoned pastureland where alien grasses and weeds, introduced as forage for cattle, are the dominant vegetation. Since 1989, over 400,000 koa, ʻōhiʻa, and other native plants have been planted in this area as part of the refuge's reforestation program. The Pua Akala Cabin, located within the refuge, was nominated to the National Register of Historic Places in August 2008.

In 1985, 32,733 acres (132.47 km^{2}) on the eastern slope of Mauna Kea were established as the Hakalau Forest Unit. In 1997, the Fish and Wildlife Service purchased an additional 5,300 acres (21 km^{2}) of land to create the Kona Forest Unit of Hakalau Forest NWR. The Kona Forest Unit includes lands within the Hoʻokena and Kalahiki land divisions on the western slopes of Mauna Loa, at elevations of 2,000–6,000 ft (610–1,830 m). One of the primary purposes for the creation of this unit was to protect the habitat of the ʻalalā (Corvus hawaiiensis), which is now extinct in the wild. The Kona Forest Unit is located about 23 mi (37 km) south of Kailua-Kona, coordinates 19°22′58″N 155°51′5″W. The Kona Forest district is somewhat drier than the Hakalau Unit.

== Wildlife and habitat ==
Much of Hawaii's native lowland habitat was first degraded following the Polynesians’ arrival over a thousand years ago. In the late 18th century, cattle, goats, and European pigs were additionally released into the forests, and hundreds of additional alien plants, animals, and insects have subsequently been introduced. Most lowland plants seen today like the orchid, ginger, and plumeria are aliens or nonnative. Introduced animals such as mosquitoes, wasps, small Asian mongooses, cats, and rats have also harmed Hawaiian habitat and native species.

Grazing pressure by cattle and pigs has resulted in the replacement of Hawaiian plants by more competitive alien grasses and shrubs within the upper portions of Hakalau Forest. Below this pasture area, the native tree canopy is still intact, but the native understory has been replaced by alien grasses, blackberry (Rubus spp.), banana poka (Passiflora tarminiana), and English holly (Ilex aquifolium). The replacement process may have been accelerated by efforts to create more pasture land through bulldozing and burning, and by logging mature trees for timber and fence posts.

Eight of the 14 native bird species occurring at Hakalau are endangered. Thirteen migratory bird species and 20 introduced species, including eight game birds, as well as the endangered ʻopeʻapeʻa (Hawaiian hoary bat, Lasiurus cinereus semotus) also frequent the refuge. Twenty-nine rare plant species are known from the refuge and adjacent lands. Twelve are currently listed as endangered. Two endangered lobelias have fewer than five plants known to exist in the wild.

== Climate ==
According to the Köppen Climate Classification system, Hakalau has an oceanic climate, abbreviated "Cfb" on climate maps. The hottest temperature recorded in Hakalau was 81 °F (27.2 °C) on July 17, 2002, while the coldest temperature recorded was 30 °F (−1.1 °C) on February 10, 2021.

Climate data for Hakalau, Hawaii, 2006–2020 normals, extremes 2002–present
Month	Jan	Feb	Mar	Apr	May	Jun	Jul	Aug	Sep	Oct	Nov	Dec	Year
Record high °F (°C)	76 (24)	76 (24)	72 (22)	77 (25)	76 (24)	77 (25)	81 (27)	78 (26)	75 (24)	77 (25)	77 (25)	76 (24)	81 (27)
Mean maximum °F (°C)	71.7 (22.1)	70.1 (21.2)	67.7 (19.8)	68.8 (20.4)	70.3 (21.3)	72.8 (22.7)	73.7 (23.2)	73.7 (23.2)	71.3 (21.8)	72.3 (22.4)	71.1 (21.7)	71.5 (21.9)	75.7 (24.3)
Mean daily maximum °F (°C)	62.9 (17.2)	61.1 (16.2)	60.3 (15.7)	61.7 (16.5)	63.2 (17.3)	65.6 (18.7)	66.6 (19.2)	67.1 (19.5)	65.5 (18.6)	65.6 (18.7)	63.6 (17.6)	62.6 (17.0)	63.8 (17.7)
Daily mean °F (°C)	52.0 (11.1)	50.9 (10.5)	51.1 (10.6)	52.2 (11.2)	53.2 (11.8)	54.9 (12.7)	56.0 (13.3)	56.5 (13.6)	55.5 (13.1)	55.7 (13.2)	53.9 (12.2)	52.8 (11.6)	53.7 (12.1)
Mean daily minimum °F (°C)	41.0 (5.0)	40.6 (4.8)	41.9 (5.5)	42.6 (5.9)	43.3 (6.3)	44.3 (6.8)	45.4 (7.4)	46.0 (7.8)	45.4 (7.4)	45.8 (7.7)	44.2 (6.8)	42.9 (6.1)	43.6 (6.4)
Mean minimum °F (°C)	34.3 (1.3)	33.1 (0.6)	35.1 (1.7)	35.4 (1.9)	37.1 (2.8)	37.9 (3.3)	38.9 (3.8)	39.5 (4.2)	39.3 (4.1)	39.7 (4.3)	36.7 (2.6)	36.1 (2.3)	32.2 (0.1)
Record low °F (°C)	31 (−1)	30 (−1)	30 (−1)	33 (1)	33 (1)	36 (2)	35 (2)	35 (2)	36 (2)	36 (2)	34 (1)	33 (1)	30 (−1)
Source: National Weather Service

== Recreation ==
To prevent spread of Rapid ʻŌhiʻa Death, the refuge is closed to self-guided visits. Guided visits on a commercial tour can be arranged for hiking and birdwatching.
