= Bird extinction =

Typically human-caused eradication of entire avian species

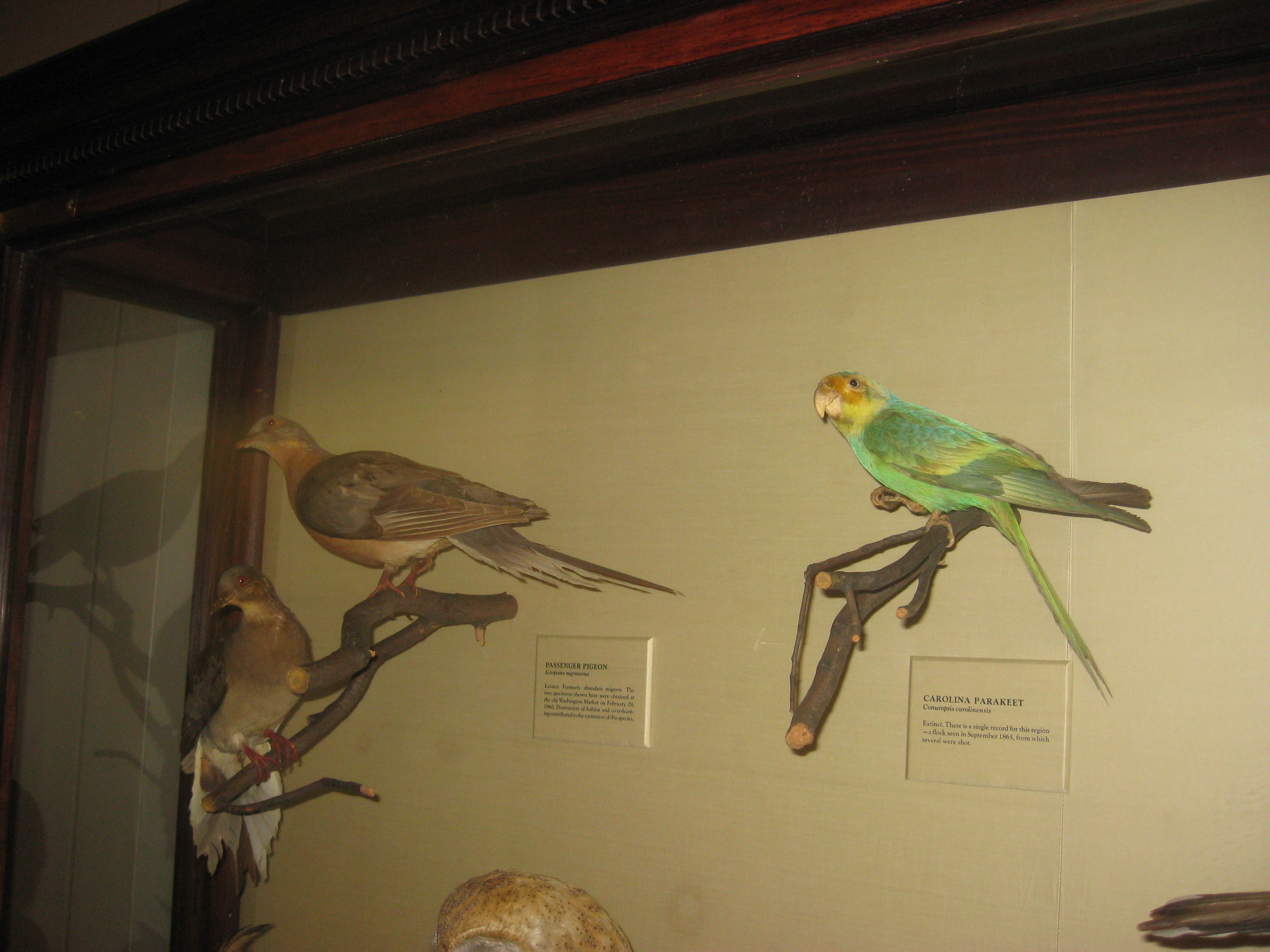
Taxidermied extinct birds, two passenger pigeons (left) & a Carolina parakeet (right), on display at the National Museum of Natural History

Bird extinction is the complete elimination of all species members within the taxonomic class Aves. Out of all known bird species (approximately 11,154), 159 (1.4%) have become extinct, with 226 (2%) being critically endangered. There is a general consensus among ornithologists that if anthropogenic activities continue as current trends suggest, one-third of all bird species, and an even greater proportion of bird populations, will be rendered extinct by the end of the 21st century.

Critically endangered species, scientists estimate, will face extinction within a few decades without proper conservation efforts; of some of these species, the current presence of extant populations is uncertain.

== Causes ==
While often impacted by many factors simultaneously, habitat loss, exploitation, and invasive species are the greatest influences on avian extinction. Island species are especially sensitive to these factors, with 95% of bird extinctions since the late 15th century being native to islands. Habitat loss has a sizable impact on birds, with deforestation in particular associated with declines in around 70% of all known avian taxa. Some birds may be more susceptible to anthropogenic activities due to morphology. Smaller avian species tend to be harmed more significantly by the destruction of habitat, and bigger species are often endangered more so by human hunting and invasive species. Larger birds faced with extinction are often island species, and these differences in influence among birds may be in association with traits that differ between many island and mainland birds.

=== Habitat loss ===
Although the complete destruction of habitat can gravely diminish species viability, the fragmentation of habitat is also harmful and associated with extinction. For example, the wood thrush, although extant and not endangered, has seen substantial decline due in part to fragmented habitats. The brown-headed cowbird, a native brood parasite, is much more pervasive in smaller forested areas. This shift in habitat has made the wood thrush and other woodland songbirds further susceptible to parasitism, reducing their populations.

=== Exploitation ===
Exploitative behavior, such as egg collection and hunting (e.g., for feathers, meat, taxidermy, etc.), is also linked to extinction and species decline. While not inherently activities in opposition to wildlife preservation, excessive harvest can significantly harm populations, potentially resulting in extirpation and/or complete extinction. While often associated with antiquity, bird exploitation is still an issue prevalent in the 21st century, even with the establishment of conservational statutes. The ortolan bunting, a songbird considered to be a traditional delicacy, is hunted illegally in France, where it faces complete extirpation. The pet trade also has strong ties to bird extinction, particularly affecting parrots. This poaching was the primary cause of the Spix's macaw's extinction in the wild.

=== Invasive species ===
Invasive species can also pose a significant threat to bird survival, with birds of limited distribution (e.g., island species) at greater risk. Invasive species that are dangerous to birds (pigs, rodents, etc.) typically damage bird species via ground-level predation, which, especially for many island-endemic species, have no experience with or defense against. In the case of the kākāpō, a critically endangered New Zealand parrot, the sole means of defense against predators is crypsis, involving minimal movement. This behavior is effective against native predators (i.e., raptors), but does little to dissuade the invasive mammals of New Zealand (e.g., rats, cats, and stoats).

Many bird extinction events tied to disease also correlate with introduced species. Hawaiian honeycreepers, a family of finches native to Hawaii, are a prime example of this. Hawaiian honeycreeper populations are harmed by avian malaria, and its spread to these birds correlates with the arrival of the invasive southern house mosquito, a known avian malaria vector.

== Notable examples ==
=== Dodo ===
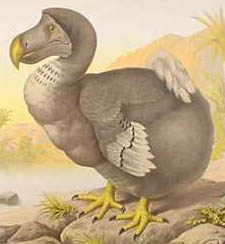
Dodo illustration

The dodo is perhaps one of the most widely recognized extinct bird species. A plump, flightless bird closely related to doves, the dodo lived solely on the island of Mauritius in the Indian Ocean. As is seen with regularity in species with abundant food and no predators on an isolated island, their descendants evolved per their environment. Dodos were flightless and, especially compared to other doves, were large and stout. Mauritius was claimed by the Dutch near the turn of the 15th century, and many Dutch explorers observed and wrote of the dodo. Their relative ease of capture and ample meat made them an appealing food source for mariners, who killed and ate many of them. Although hunting may have impacted their decline, introduced species are suspected to have had a strong hand in their extinction. The introduced pigs had great success on Mauritius and became abundant, likely killing dodo young and outcompeting adults. In the face of habitat loss and invasive species, the dodo is suspected to have gone extinct in the late 1600s, likely before it was fully described by taxonomists. Its sudden extinction highlights the susceptibility of endemic island species, and the dodo serves as an early poster species for anthropogenic extinction.

=== Great auk ===
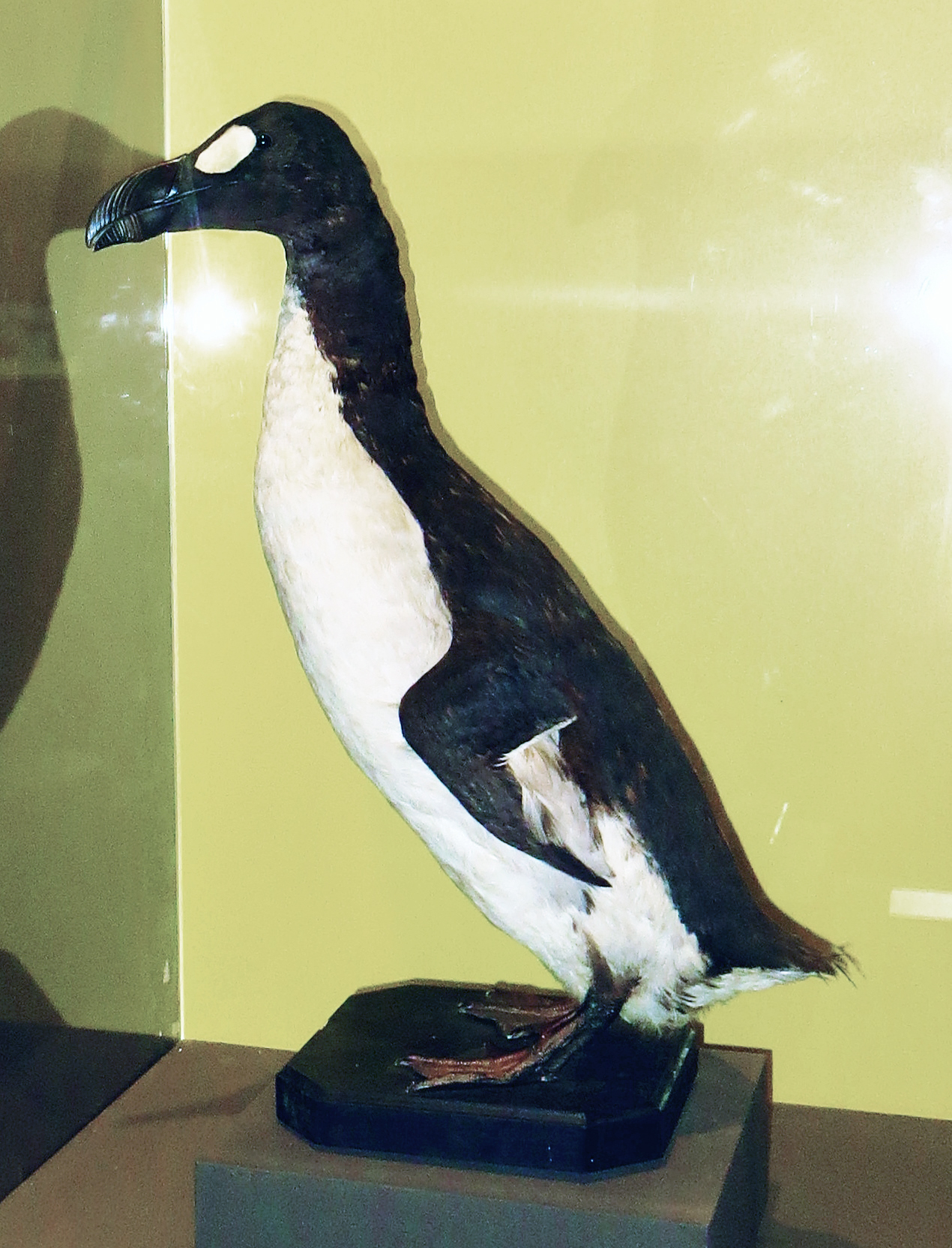
A taxidermized Great Auk

The great auk (or, as it has been nicknamed, the "Penguin of the North") was a flightless marine bird that inhabited the North Atlantic Ocean and its nearby islands. Its range once extended to the continental United States and Europe. However, by the 1800s, its range had shrunk, breeding only on a few North Atlantic rocky islands. Targeted for their coveted skins, eggs, and down, hunters took advantage of the great auk's breeding season, when pairs nested in large colonies on rocky islands. It was much more difficult to hunt when not breeding, as birds were less concentrated and spent most of their time in frigid waters, where they were swift and adept swimmers. The last known sighting of the species alive was in 1844 when a breeding pair was found and strangled by fishermen, hoping to sell the birds' valuable skins. The great auk is believed to have gone extinct around this time.

=== Passenger pigeon ===
The passenger pigeon was a flocking species that was once a species widespread in North America. Before the arrival of colonial Europeans to North America, the passenger pigeon was thought to account for up to 40% of all individual birds on the continent. The main drivers of the species' extinction were habitat destruction and overhunting. On top of anthropogenic activities, the deforestation that put passenger pigeons at risk was also catalyzed by the invasive chestnut blight, which greatly reduced the number of American chestnut trees in North America. Their abundance and congregative behavior made them an appealing choice for hunting, and the size of their populations led people to believe they were in no need of protection. The birds were killed in great numbers, and a widespread pigeon meat industry developed. Some environmental legislation was put into place to protect the declining passenger pigeon, but it did little to improve their populations. Due to their congregational breeding habits, captive breeding was almost impossible, and populations further diminished. It was declared extinct in 1914, upon the death of the last known survivor of the species, Martha, at the Cincinnati Zoo, 20 years after the species became extinct in the wild. The passenger pigeon is one of the few recently extinct bird species that has been proposed for "de-extinction". The entire genome of the species has been sequenced from surviving tissue, with the hope of being able to revive the species using genome engineering and in vitro fertilization.

=== Carolina parakeet ===
Also known as the Carolina parrot or Carolina conure, the Carolina parakeet was native to and abundant in much of the eastern half of the United States. The granivorous birds ate many agricultural crops in high numbers, much to the ire of local farmers. This, on top of interest in their colorful feathers, fueled massive killing efforts. Large death tolls and loss of habitat decimated their populations. The Carolina parakeet was deemed extinct in the early 1920s, with the last member of its species, a male named Incas, dying in the Cincinnati Zoo in 1918.

=== Tasmanian Emu ===
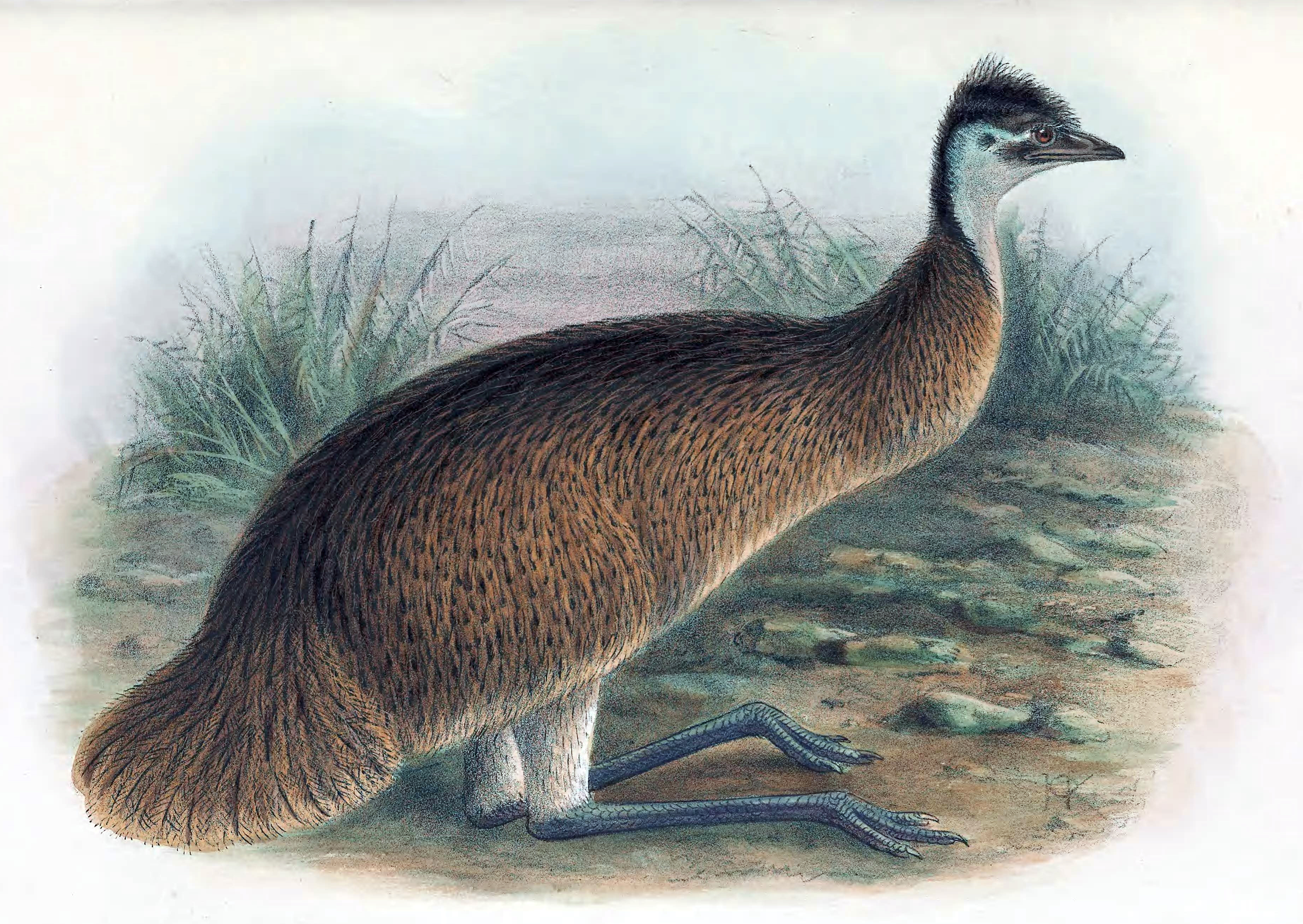
Tasmanian Emu

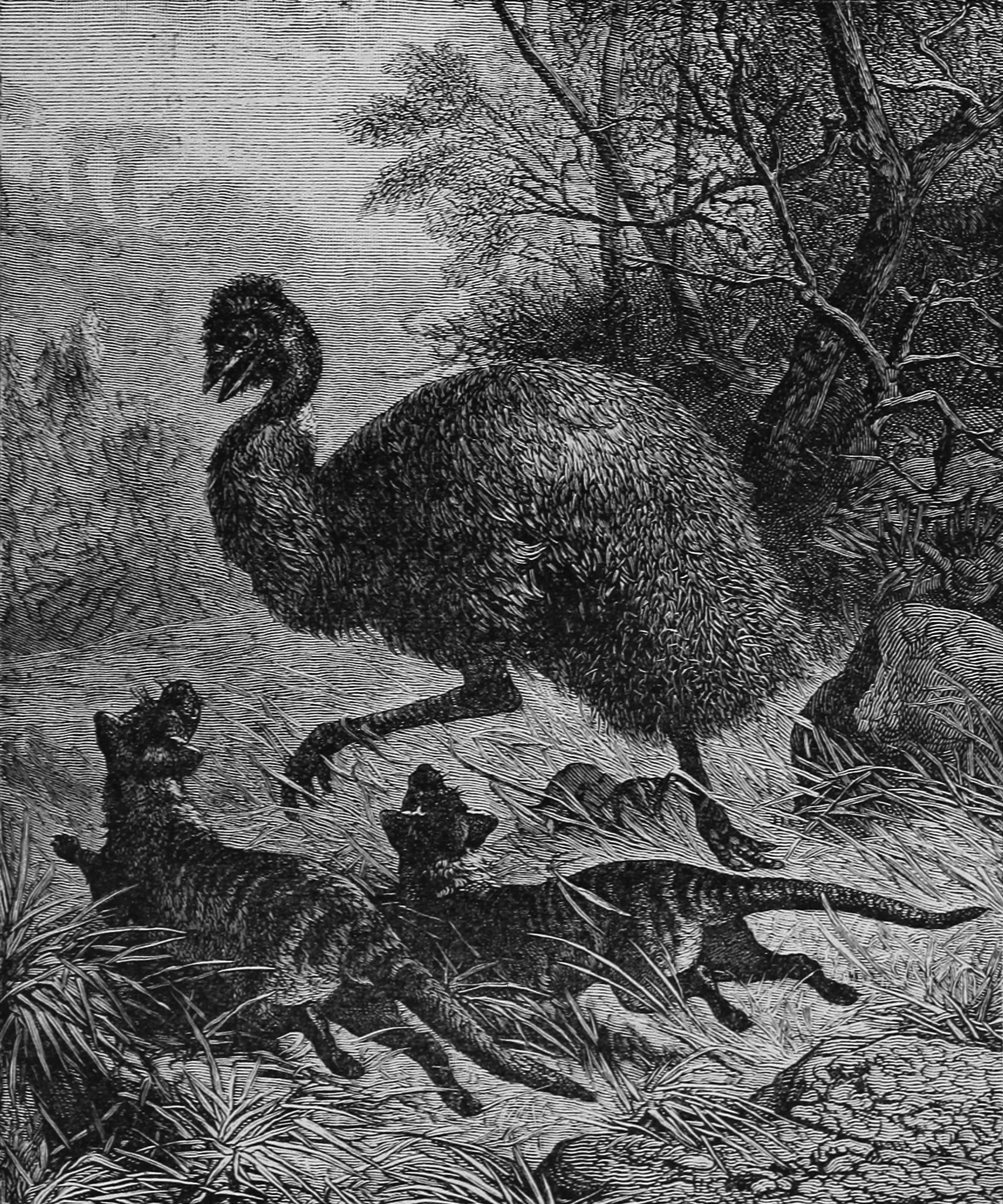
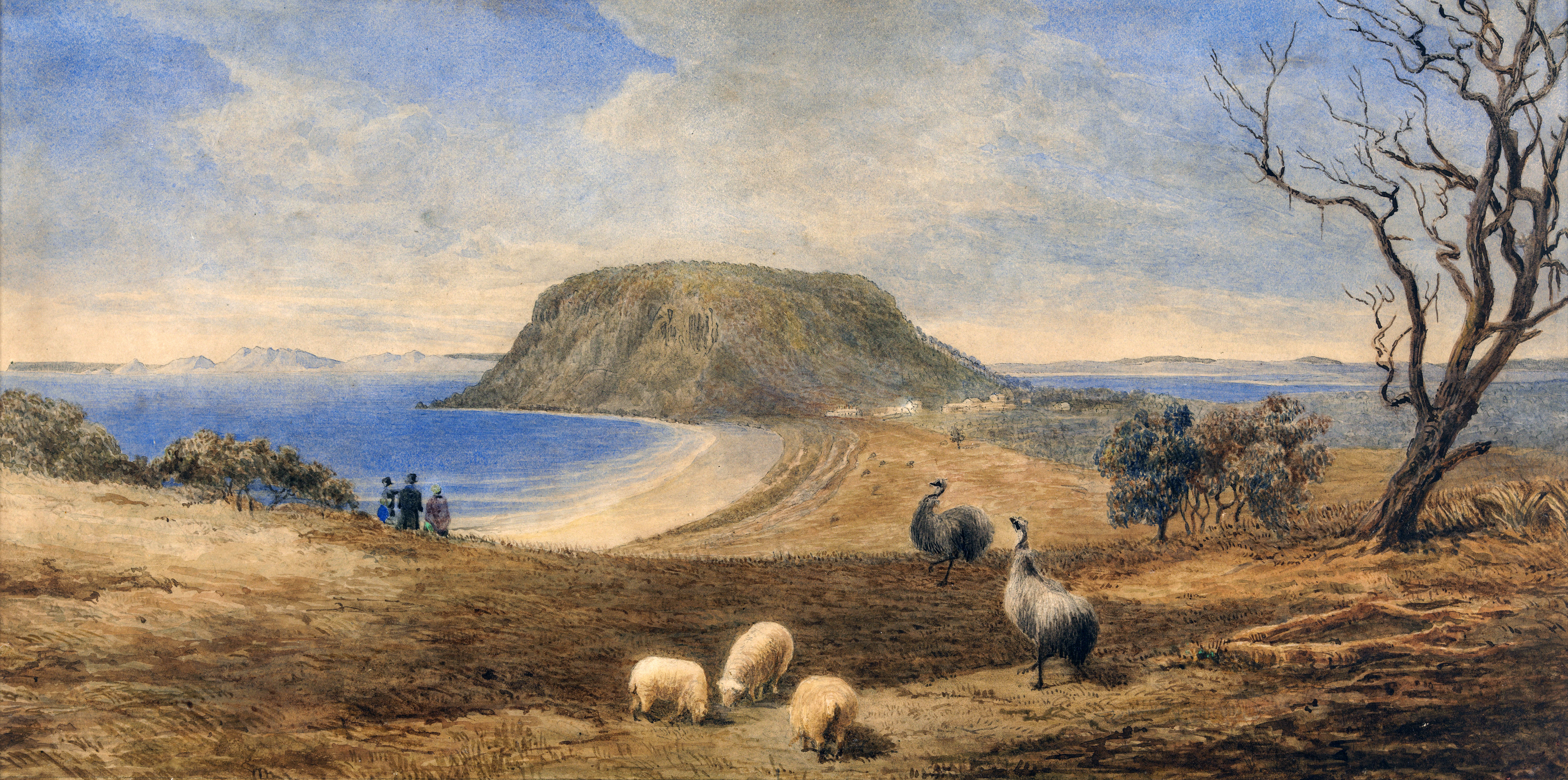

The Tasmanian emu was a subspecies of emu endemic to the island of Tasmania, Australia. In comparison to its mainland relatives, the Tasmanian emus were believed to be smaller in size and appeared to have a darker plumage, lacking the distinctive black feather found in other emu subspecies. Historical records indicate that within just 20 years, from the 1830s to the 1850s, the Tasmanian emu became locally extinct. This occurred due to various factors that led to the disappearance of this subspecies.

== By region ==
=== Australia ===
In June 2020, the Royal Society of South Australia published a list of 95 Australian bird fossils. The list includes three species of huge flamingos from the Kati Thanda-Lake Eyre and Lake Frome areas of South Australia, which were estimated to inhabit the area for 25 million years before becoming extinct about 140,000 years ago, most likely from drought. There were also penguins measuring about 2 metres (6 ft 7 in) tall, which lived between about 60 million and 30 million years ago, dying out in the Oligocene. Researcher Trevor Worthy said that little was known about the evolution of birds in Australia, which stands at about 1,000 species.

== See also ==
- List of recently extinct bird species
- List of bird extinctions by year
