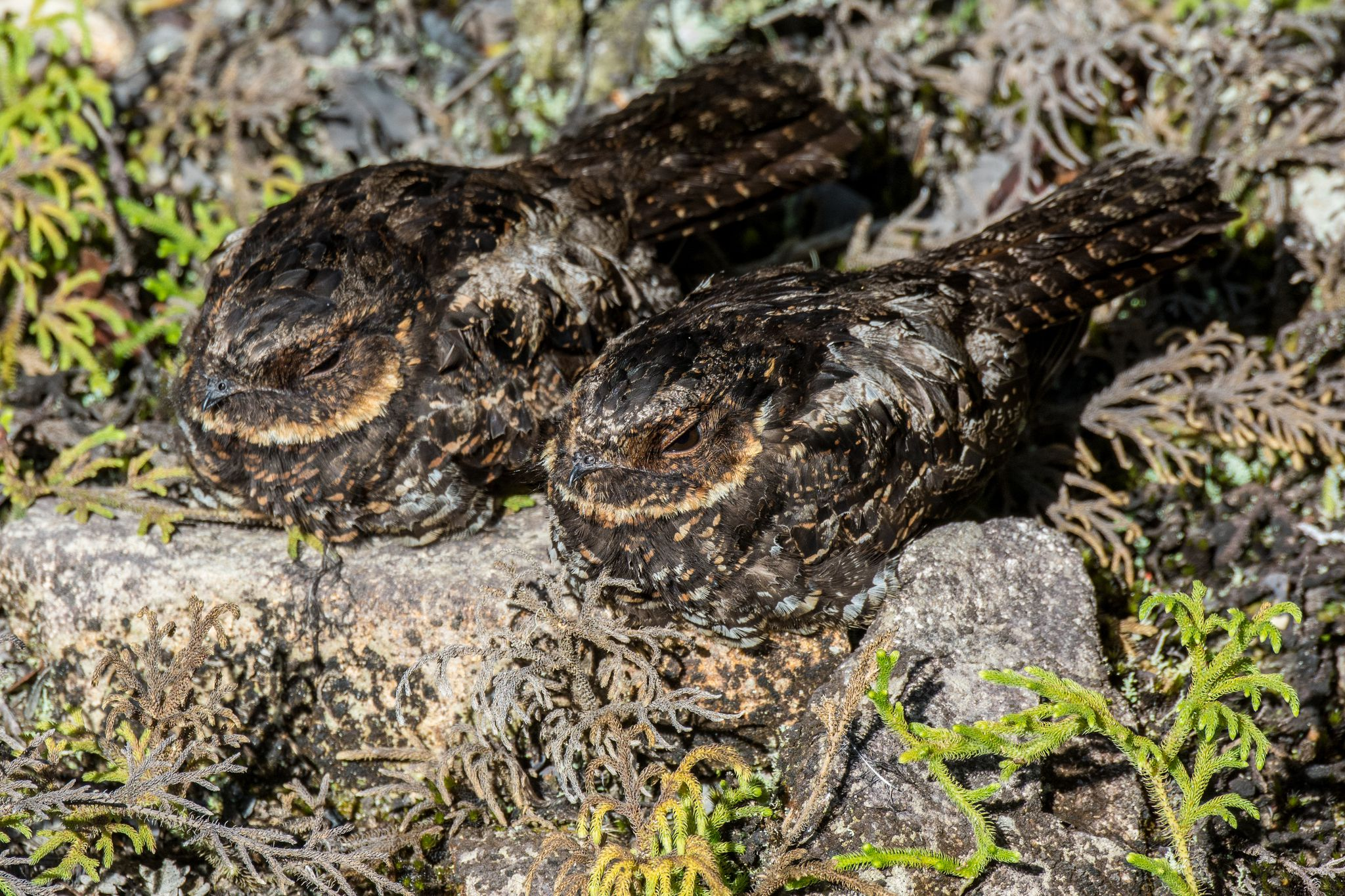

Conservation status
- Least Concern (IUCN 3.1)

Scientific classification
- Kingdom: Animalia
- Phylum: Chordata
- Class: Aves
- Order: Caprimulgiformes
- Family: Caprimulgidae
- Genus: Eurostopodus
- Species: E. diabolicus

Binomial name
- Eurostopodus diabolicus Stresemann, 1931

= Satanic nightjar =

Species of bird

The Satanic nightjar (Eurostopodus diabolicus), also Heinrich's nightjar, satanic eared-nightjar, Sulawesi eared-nightjar, Satanic goatsucker or diabolical nightjar is a mid-sized, spotted, dark brown nightjar endemic to the Indonesian island of Sulawesi. The species was discovered in 1931 by Gerd Heinrich, a German natural historian who collected a single female holotype from Mount Klabat on the Minahasa peninsula of Northern Sulawesi.

In the following decades, there were a few unconfirmed reports of sightings and calls of the bird, but it did not officially resurface until 1996 when David Bishop and Jared Diamond positively identified it in Lore Lindu National Park by its sound. This made the visible rediscovery available for multiple people in the tour group including poet and writer Jan Zwaaneveld. This increased the bird's estimated range by 750 km (470 mi). It has since been observed and described in literature multiple times.

== Description ==
The Satanic nightjar measures about 27 cm (11 in) long. It has a white to buff-colored collar at its throat, blackish head, greyish-brown back, barred brown belly, and white spots on its 3rd and 4th outer primaries. It can be distinguished from other nightjars in the area by its dark color and the absence of ear tufts, white tail, and wing patches.

== Etymology ==
The Satanic nightjar's common and Latin name originate from interpretations of its vocalizations. Some authors report that in flight, the bird makes a "plip-plop" call like dripping water, which locals have also likened to the sound of the bird pulling out a person's eye. However, this description may be wrongly attributed to this species as it does not agree with more recent accounts of the bird's call. It is also sometimes called Heinrich's nightjar, the diabolical nightjar, the devilish nightjar, the Sulawesi nightjar and other names. These last three names have largely fallen out of use. Its common names sometimes also include the word "eared" despite its lack of ear tufts. Some of this bird's advocates prefer the name "Satanic", believing it will draw more attention and conservation interest to the little-known nightjar.

== Taxonomy ==
The Satanic nightjar belongs to the order Caprimulgiformes, and the nightjar family Caprimulgidae, falling within the genus Eurostopodus along with six other birds. Though it is sometimes confused with other nightjars found within its range such as great eared nightjar (Eurostopodus macrotis), savanna nightjar (Caprimulgus affinis), and the Sulawesi nightjar (Caprimulgus celebensis) it is believed to share a closer evolutionary origin with New Guinea nightjars including Archbold's nightjar (Eurostopodus archboldi) and the Papuan nightjar (Eurostopodus papuensis), which it most resembles in appearance and habitat preference. Though Satanic nightjars have always been treated as a single species, recent comparisons of photographed and observed individuals have revealed differences which could indicate there are in fact two separate types. Individuals from central Sulawesi have grey on their tails and scapulars, along with white-tipped, oval-shaped breast feathers. Conversely, individuals from the north of the island lack grey markings and have less pronounced breast feathers. Regional differences in the birds' song may also exist. However, more evidence must be gathered before any conclusions can be drawn.

== Distribution and habitat ==
The Satanic nightjar is restricted to Sulawesi, Indonesia. It inhabits lowland and mountain rainforests of the region from 250 to 2,300 metres (820 to 7,550 ft) above sea level. It seems to favour edge habitats with low canopies and groves of palms and rattans. It can be found in forest clearings, as well as open spaces created by roads and trails in old-growth forests. While it has mostly been sighted in the north and central parts of the island, its range could extend over all of Sulawesi.

== Behavior ==
=== Vocalizations ===
The Satanic nightjar makes a range of different vocalizations. While flying, the bird produces a burst of loud, ascending, "fWIP! fWIP" notes set at 1 second intervals. These notes can also occur more sporadically, sometimes sung suddenly and close-together in pairs of "fWIP-WIK!, fWIP-WIK!" where the last note is shorter and sharper than the first. When at rest, the bird might trill a string of quick, constant notes "TWIk-TWIk- TWIk" which sound similar to its paired calls. Each note begins loudly but ends softly and the song generally decreases in volume and pitch, lasting about 2–6 seconds. In one recorded trill call, the song was preceded by a small number of weak, low qu/wick! sounds. When disturbed, the nightjar may also make growling noises, which accompany a threat display. Nonetheless, the bird vocalizes rarely, which may partly explain its elusiveness.

=== Diet ===
Like other nightjars, this bird preys on insects while flying. It hunts along the forest edge, active near dusk and dawn. However, little is known about its diet. It is thought to feed primarily on nocturnal insects such as moths.

=== Reproduction ===
The Satanic nightjar has a generation time of 5.4 years. It breeds from March to October, though this range might actually encompass two distinct breeding seasons. It roosts and nests on the ground, its cryptic plumage helping it blend in with the surrounding leaf litter during the day. The bird builds nests in open areas with a bit of cover from surrounding logs and vegetation such as ferns and moss. Its nest consists of a shallow scrape and a few leaves, with one nest measured to be 1 cm (0.39 in) deep and 14 cm (5.5 in) wide. In this, the bird will lay a cream-colored egg with brown spots. Observed nests have typically contained only a single egg or chick which the parents raise for a month or more. When its offspring are threatened, the Satanic nightjar has been observed to spread its wings and tail, and gape widely, sometimes calling or agitating its body.

== Threats and conservation ==
The IUCN red list ranks the Satanic nightjar as Least Concern. Its population is small, sparse, and confined within a limited range. There no empirical data upon which to make a good population estimate, though the population is believed to be gradually declining. Its only known threat is habitat loss due to agriculture. Most of the lowland forest of the region has largely vanished or become fragmented. Between 1990 and 2000 alone, 20% of forest cover was lost in the region. Regenerated secondary growth forests do provide habitat, but seem to harbour a smaller diversity of endemic Sulawesi birds than old-growth forests. Despite its small distribution, the bird can adapt to disturbed areas better than previously assumed as it uses the edge habitat along deforested areas. It has been sighted in two protected areas and ranges farther south than once thought. No current programs are underway to monitor, manage, or raise awareness about the bird, and further surveys are needed to ascertain its distribution and population.
