= Archbold's nightjar =

Conservation status
- Least Concern (IUCN 3.1)

Scientific classification
- Kingdom: Animalia
- Phylum: Chordata
- Class: Aves
- Order: Caprimulgiformes
- Family: Caprimulgidae
- Genus: Eurostopodus
- Species: E. archboldi

Binomial name
- Eurostopodus archboldi (Mayr & Rand, 1935)
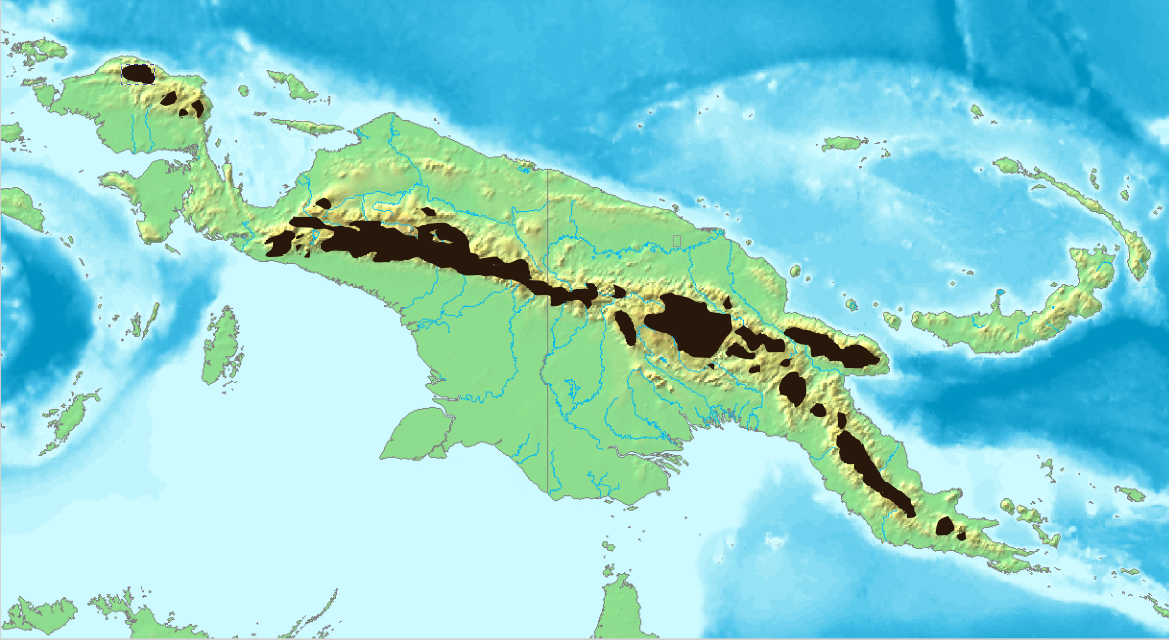
- Geographic range of Archbold's nightjar

Species of bird

Archbold's nightjar (Eurostopodus archboldi), also known as the mountain eared nightjar or cloud-forest nightjar, is a dark and densely spotted species of nightjar in the family Caprimulgidae. It is endemic to New Guinea and is the only nightjar species inhabiting the high-elevation subtropical and tropical montane forests of New Guinea. This bird is named after the American explorer Richard Archbold, whose expedition in New Guinea in 1933-1934 led to the discovery of the species.

Archbold's nightjar is a nocturnal species, roosting on the ground during the day and emerging to forage at night. It is a proficient hunter, specialising in catching large insects while in flight.

Due to its restricted geographic range and secretive nature, it is not commonly encountered, and very little is understood about this species. Additionally, due to the great diversity of other avian species in New Guinea, there has been a lack of targeted studies on nightjar species, and particularly not of E. archboldi.

== Taxonomy ==
Archbold's nightjar is classified in the order Caprimulgiformes, and the nightjar family Caprimulgidae under the genus Eurostopodus alongside six other bird species. Prior to its reclassification in the genus Eurostopodus, Archbold's nightjar was formally placed under the genus Lyncornis. Its type locality is recorded as the West slope of Mount Tafa at an altitude of 2,400 metres (7,900 ft), in New Guinea. Although no formal publication documents this reclassification, the earliest known reference that cites Archbold's nightjar as Eurostopodus archboldi appears in Results of the Archbold Expeditions. No. 43. (1942). As such, all subsequent literature published after 1942 refers to the species as Eurostopodus archboldi. Archbold's nightjar is monotypic, with no subspecies being accepted.

Its closest relative, the Papuan nightjar (Eurostopodus papuensis), also inhabits the forests of New Guinea and looks morphologically similar to Archbold's nightjar, but it is smaller and darker with less spots, and occurs at lower altitudes.

=== Etymology ===
The genus name Eurostopodus is derived from the Ancient Greek words eurōstos, meaning "strong" or "stout" and pous (genitive podos) meaning "foot", while the species name archboldi honours the American explorer, Richard Archbold, who conducted a series of expeditions in New Guinea which led to the discovery of the great biodiversity of this region. During his first expedition in southeast New Guinea, known as the First Archbold Expedition (1933-1934), Archbold collected a total of 3,200 bird specimens, including E. archboldi.

== Description ==
The body length of adults is around 26–30 centimetres (10–12 in). The adult wingspan is 19.6–21.9 centimetres (7.7–8.6 in), and the tail length 13.4–15.7 centimetres (5.3–6.2 in); the bill length is 1.35–1.61 centimetres (0.53–0.63 in). Archbold's nightjar's small, hooked beak is black, its irises are dark brown, and its legs and feet are dark grey or brown with black claws.

=== Plumage ===
The top of the head is dark brown and streaked buff-rufous along the edges of the feathers. Sides of the crown are grey-brown with thin black streaks. The lore and ear coverts are black-dark brown and lightly spotted buff. The throat is dark brown, vividly covered in buff-rufous coloured spots, with a distinct white patch on both sides of the lower throat. The mantle and back are black-dark brown with vivid buff-rufous coloured spots and grey streaks. This blackish-brown colour transitions into a slightly paler, greyish colour on the rump and the uppertail coverts. The breast is dark brown with bold, short buff-rufous streaks, and feathers become increasingly spotted buff-white as we reach the belly down to the undertail coverts. At rest, the dark brown tail is held into a rigid "tent" shape. The innermost tail feathers are faintly barred grey-white, whereas the outer tail feathers have a distinct pale grey-white bar and a broad buff-tawny bar on the edges of the feathers. The wing coverts are black-dark brown and spotted rufous, buff and tawny, with greater spotting on lesser coverts. The primaries and secondaries are black-dark brown, but secondaries are spotted rufous-tawny on the edges of the feathers. The tertials are also dark-brown, but mottled greyish-brown in addition to the buff spots.

Male and female individuals closely resemble each other, with some field guides describing females featuring more cinnamon-tawny spots on their dorsal and breast feathers, and thin brownish-yellow tips on the tail feathers instead of the grey-white tips found in males. Juvenile plumage differs from the adult plumage. Juveniles are entirely ashy grey-white, and possess a dark eye-patch. Their upperparts are lightly spotted black and their underparts are barred dark grey, interspersed with a few rufous feathers.

== Distribution and habitat ==
Archbold's nightjar is a species endemic to New Guinea, dwelling in the highlands of the Central Cordillera mountain ranges. It has a patchy distribution, restricted to montane forests situated near clearings and open heathy regions. In fact, Archbold's nightjar is the sole high-mountain nightjar species of New Guinea, found in elevations of 1,800 metres (5,900 ft) up to 3,260 metres (10,700 ft). Records indicate that this species is sedentary , exhibiting limited seasonal movement.

== Behaviour ==
This secretive bird is nocturnal and crepuscular, emerging at night and exhibiting peak activity at dusk when it forages. During the day, individuals typically roost on the ground, on logs, or on branches. These roosting sites are generally found in small forest clearings. E. archboldi may occur solitarily, in pairs, or even in small groups. In fact, in some instances, 2-3 individuals may roost together, resting alongside one another across adjacent branches.

=== Flight ===
Archbold's nightjar has an undulating, fluttery flight pattern consisting of rapid wing strokes interspersed with long sweeping glides. In flight, the wings appear elongated with blunt-ended, "fingered" wing tips, an adaptation consistent with their skillful gliding maneuverability. Like other nightjar species, Archbold's nightjar holds its wings upward in a "V" shape as it glides.

=== Diet ===
Like other members of the Caprimulgidae family, Archbold's nightjar is exclusively an insectivore. At dusk, individuals have been reported to feed by sallying, catching insects in flight before promptly returning to perch on a nearby branch or log. Stomach content analysis of captured specimens has documented that E. archboldi prefers feeding on larger insect species. Commonly consumed insects include beetles, moths, and cicadas. E. archboldi are agile predators, flying swiftly and hunting over grassy terrains or in and around forest clearings, flying low at ~30 feet (9.1 m) above the ground, but some have also been observed to sally amongst the treetops.

=== Reproduction ===
Across its range, the breeding season occurs between October to early December with an estimated generation time of 4.56 years. Archbold's nightjars do not build nests. A clutch consists of a single egg, which is laid directly on the ground on top of leaf-litter. Nest sites are typically located amongst stones and shrubs, and may be concealed from the surrounding vegetation, allowing individuals to blend in with their environment because of their cryptic coloration. Likes roost sites, nest sites are usually situated in forest clearings or forest edges. The eggs are white, and unlike other nightjar species, lack blotches.

=== Vocalisations ===
Not much is known of its calls, as it is a relatively quiet bird. Its song is mainly heard at dusk, and consists of a soft guttural call of 2-3 short trilled tchrrrt notes.

If a threat is detected and an adult is startled from its nest, it may produce a very loud alarm call before retreating to a nearby branch. While perched, it will remain motionless until the intruder leaves and might produce a liquid trill consisting of soft whur-whur-whur notes. Alternatively, the individual might engage in displays of aggression consisting fluttering movements as a means of distracting the intruder. If the threat does not leave the nest site, adults may fly back and attempt to deter the intruder by hovering over them and emitting a harsh hissing alarm call.

== Conservation ==
The IUCN red list currently ranks Archbold's nightjar as "Least Concern". Although the species is known to occupy a geographic range which encompasses large tracts of undisturbed forest, including conservation sites over a portion of its range, its overall population trend is thought to be decreasing. Despite the population size not being formally assessed, its restricted geographic range exhibits its strong reliance on montane forest habitat. As such, given the reduction in tree cover driven by deforestation within its range over the past decade, it is speculated that this rate of habitat loss has likely led to an estimated population decline of 5% during this period.

Despite indications of population decline and threats to Archbold's nightjar, there are no clear conservation decisions implemented as of yet because knowledge of this elusive species remains limited. Moreover, the lack of targeted research and monitoring programs for this species further limits understanding of its ecology, population dynamics, and potential conservation needs.
