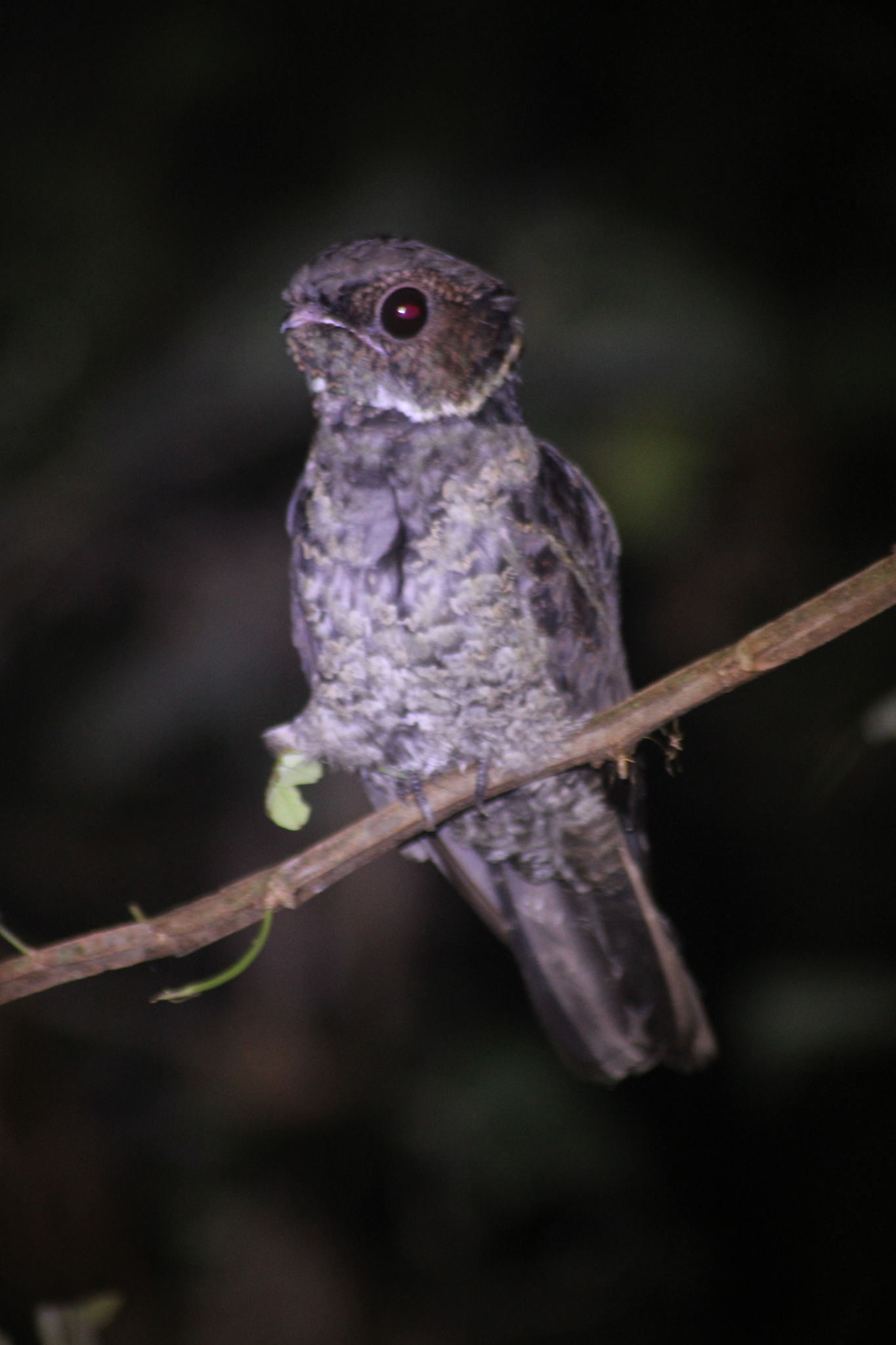

Conservation status
- Least Concern (IUCN 3.1)

Scientific classification
- Kingdom: Animalia
- Phylum: Chordata
- Class: Aves
- Order: Caprimulgiformes
- Family: Caprimulgidae
- Genus: Lyncornis
- Species: L. temminckii

Binomial name
- Lyncornis temminckii Gould, 1838
- L. temminckii distribution

Synonyms
- Eurostopodus temminckii

= Malayan eared nightjar =

Species of bird

The Malayan eared nightjar, Malaysian eared nightjar or Malay eared nightjar (Lyncornis temminckii) is a species of nightjar in the family Caprimulgidae. It was formerly placed in the genus Eurostopodus. It is known as Taptibau Kecil in Bahasa melayu or Tukang Tabtibau amongst Malaysian indigenous communities. It is dispersed throughout Southeast Asia, primarily occurring in Malaysia, Sumatra, Borneo, Thailand, Indonesia and Singapore. It is a nocturnal insectivorous bird characterised by cryptic colouration of brown and white patterns, to aid it in camouflaging into its environment. Due to the nocturnal nature and feeding habits, it prefers subtropical, tropical and moist lowland forests, and have been recorded from sea-level to 1065 meters. It is easily distinguished by its ear-tufts, giving it an "eared" appearance which led to its name.

== Taxonomy and systematics ==
The Malayan eared nightjar belongs to the order Caprimulgiformes, Caprimulgidae family and the Lyncornis genus. The nightjars include seven extant species split into two genera, Eurostopodus and Lyncornis. The Malayan eared nightjar is monotypic and its sister species, the great eared nightjar (Lyncornis macrotis) are the only two species within the Lyncornis genus, although the Malayan eared nightjar was previously classified in the Eurostopodus genus. Their reclassification came about through a combination of molecular, morphological and acoustic data. The Eurostopodus genus was previously thought to be monophyletic, but with increased taxon sampling and the observation that the Malayan eared and great eared nightjars possess significantly distinct morphological features from their generic counterparts, the warrant for them to be placed into a separate genus (of which the name Lyncornis Gould, 1838 was available) was proposed. Further molecular analyses revealed that species within Lyncornis and Eurostopodus did not share the same common ancestor and the Malayan eared nightjar differed from all other taxa by a mean divergence of 11.1%, the greatest divergence amongst the taxon and thus further justifying their generic split.

Furthermore, this divergence is evident via morphological differences such as the Malayan eared nightjar and great eared nightjar possessing characteristic ear-tufts at the rear of their crown, which are absent in Eurostopodus nightjars, who have a smooth head without the raised tufts. The Malayan eared and great eared nightjars also have distinguishable white coloration along their wings and throat, countering their blackish-brown body. The Eurostopodus nightjars in contrast, are primarily blackish-brown with brown speckles and do not have any white coloration. Furthermore, based on 17 character states (mutually exclusive features among taxa), the Malayan eared nightjar was found to be diagnosable from all other taxa by three to six character states, which further supports their taxonomic revision. Multivariate analyses of their vocalisations also shows that the two eared nightjars are postulated to share similar vocal features which stand out against Eurostopodus nightjars. For instance, the Malayan eared nightjar has a lower frequency range, with deep and shrill calls. Their calls are also longer, more continuous and involve a variety of whistles, hoots and churring noises in comparison to the Eurostopodus species, whom calls are shorter, more abrupt and typically compose of repetitive calls. These vocal differences could be explained by their biogeographical and ecological distinctions. Lyncornis species are typically distributed within tropical forests of Southeast Asia while Eurostopodus species are found more so in Australasian habitats with open environments. This biogeographical difference also suggests that the groups adapted to different environments and conditions over time, thus further supporting the generic split and that they did not evolve from the same common ancestor.

Within the Lyncornis genus, a reconstructed phylogenetic tree would show the monophyly Malayan eared nightjar being a sister to the monophyletic great eared nightjar, which is polytypic with three major clades. This is because the great eared nightjar of Indochina, Philippines and Bangladesh differ slightly from one another and exhibit some genetic divergence, whereas the Malayan eared nightjars of Sumatra, Borneo and Malaysia do not genetically nor morphologically vary, thus rendering them monotypic.

== Description and identification ==
Malayan eared nightjars are medium-sized within the Lyncornis genus, ranging between 25-28 cm in length. They are smaller than their sister species, the great eared nightjar but larger than most Caprimulgidae birds. Their plumage is cryptically coloured, with deep patterns of browns, black and greys to aid them with camouflaging into the night when they are most actively foraging, whilst also making them difficult to spot while they are resting during the day. Their bodies are buff, tawny (orange-red) and blackish-brown with white speckles along their wings and a white throat patch or white spot on their lower throat, countering their dark body. They have ear-tufts, which are distinctive hair patches at the rear-end of their crown. These ear-tufts stand up when the bird is erect, allowing them to be easily identified, but lie flat when the bird is laying down or crouching into itself, thus allowing them to evade predators. They also have a reflective layer of tissue in their eye known as tapetum lucidum, which gives them night vision by reflecting visible light to the back of their eyes via the retina. With a long wingspan of 197-218 mm and a long tail of 121-218 mm, Malayan eared nightjars are also powerful and spry fliers.

=== Adult male ===
The forehead, crown and nape of an adult male Malayan eared nightjar is greyish-brown and cinnamon-brown. Their crown feathers behind their eyes are often upright and vertical, sometimes mistaken for their ear-tufts. They have a thin blackish-brown border around their hind-neck resembling a collar. Other feathers, such as their primaries and secondaries are brown, spotted and thinly barred pale. Their mantle and rump are dark brown, allowing them to be covert. They possess more whitish dotting and coloration around their belly, flanks and undertail, giving them a distinct "buffish" appearance.

=== Adult female ===
The adult females are similar to the males, however have more red coloration speckled around their bodies whereas males usually do not exhibit any rufescence. Some female birds also have red spotting around their rump, and it is postulated that females appear more rufescent during breeding season compared to non-breeding season, to better attract mates.

=== Immature and juvenile ===
The immature and juvenile Malayan eared nightjars are similar to their adult counterparts, but their upper body exhibit more cinnamon and orange-brown coloration. They are also less heavily speckled and have less buff on their underbelly. Upon hatching, chicks are covered in yellowish down feathers which is darker on their crown and nape. They have pale bills and their legs and feet are dark brown as chicks.

== Habitat and distribution ==
Distribution map of Lyncornis temminckii where populations have been recorded.

Due to their insectivorous diet, Malayan eared nightjars prefer lowland forests, forest edges and dense subtropical and tropical forests. Their distribution spans Southeast Asia, with notable populations in Malaysia where they are found both in the Peninsula and Malaysian Borneo, recorded to inhabit forests characterised by tall hardwood trees, alluvial forests, grassland, swamplands and dense rainforests. The Malayan eared nightjars are also largely found in Sumatra, where they occur in both primary and secondary forests. The species is also present across Indonesia, Singapore, Thailand and a small population exists in Southern Myanmar. The varied habitats in which the Malayan eared nightjars are distributed throughout suggests their superior ability to niche partition and adapt to their environments, whether pristine or human-altered.

== Behaviour and life history ==
=== Diurnal and nocturnal behaviour ===
The Malayan eared nightjar are nocturnal species who are inconspicuous and difficult to identify during the day due to their secretive and sedentary nature. They usually roost on the ground, camouflaging into the leaf-litter and woods. Although they occur in lowlands, during dusk, they tend to fly high in the air at elevations above 1000 meters, and hold their wings vertically in a V formation. This is done to intimidate their prey and signify to conspecifics they are commencing foraging. Subsequently, they descend and move swiftly to hunt for food, calling to each other in groups and landing on trees, posts or dead branches to snatch and hunt insects.

=== Diet and foraging ===
The species feed primarily on flying insects like beetles and moths, but also on ground-dwelling, aquatic and arboreal insects. Although most nocturnal birds forage at sites further away from waterbodies, Malayan eared nightjars also hunt for insects over bodies of water, such as streams near forests. This suggests they can exploit flying insects commonly found near water in climates of higher humidity. They are also found to utilise forest clearings (areas in a forest with no trees or bushes) as hunting grounds, showcasing they are not dependent on aquatic resources like riparian habitats or fish for foraging like most nocturnal birds are.

=== Reproduction ===
The breeding seasons of the Malayan eared nightjar are not fully documented, but they are estimated to occur during the months of January to July within the Malay Peninsula but later months of October to November in Sumatra. This may be attributed to their reproductive cycles being influenced by climate and rainfall patterns. Within the Malay Peninsula, the breeding season aligns with the non-monsoon dry season, giving rise to stable food availability and shelter. However in Sumatra, where monsoons are extremely harsh between October to November, the birds may choose to breed during this time as monsoons tend to generate a flush of insect populations, thus increasing the food availability for feeding their young. It is uncommon for birds to breed during monsoon seasons, hence the Malayan eared nightjars exhibit their ability to exploit resources and outcompete other tropical birds by doing so.

Parental care is not well-documented within the Malayan eared nightjars. They do not construct nests and instead lay their eggs on leaf-litter directly onto the ground, typically underneath trees or bushes. Their clutch sizes are relatively small, usually only one egg is laid as with most nightjars, but there have been recordings of two eggs being laid - but the reason for this remains uncertain. Their eggs are elliptical, white but speckled with grey and brown spots, and between 34.4-34.5 x 25.5-27.8 mm. Most nightjars incubate their eggs where both the male and female parent partake in incubation. Their chicks are born altricial but can walk soon upon hatching.

=== Vocalizations ===
In the eared nightjars, vocalisations and songs are thought to attain information regarding the identity of the bird, purposing as sexual and territorial display. These territorial songs are often delivered at dusk and dawn but can persist through the night, and they typically produce these songs during flight. An acoustic analysis revealed a statistical difference between the territorial song of Malayan eared nightjars and their sister species, the great eared nightjar, with non-overlapping ranges and nine to eleven acoustic character differences. However, they have also been reported to produce calls similar to that of their sister species (the great eared nightjars), hence may have the ability to perform mimicry, although this is unconfirmed. The acoustic study also revealed that their vocalizations fall into a lower frequency range, which benefits their communication in dense forest environments where these deeper calls can travel further distances and penetrate trees more easily.

Although they can produce a range of calls, their more common call is a whistled "tut-wee-ow" which is usually delivered in flight. They can undergo complex communication via whistles, hoots and churring sounds.

=== Predators ===
Predators of the Malayan eared nightjar are relatively undocumented due to how difficult it is to observe their diurnal activity. However, it is predicted that the Buffy Fish Owl (Ketupa ketupu), also known as the Malay fish owl, may prey on the nightjars, as they occur in the same range as them, are nocturnal owls and this species is known to eat other smaller birds.

== Conservation status ==
As of 2016, the Malayan eared nightjar is listed as Least Concern as per the IUCN Red List and has remained this status hitherto with a stable population throughout Malaysia, Indonesia, Sumatra and Borneo. However, its population is declining in Thailand, where the bird used to be dispersed throughout, but is now uncommon to southern regions of the country, due to habitat fragmentation and deforestation. No persistent efforts to repopulate them have been recorded in Thailand. Despite this declining population, they maintain their overall conservation status considering they have an extremely large range, with the species occupying a huge extent of occurrence up to 2,950,000 km^{2}.

Their population size has not been quantified, but they are not deemed vulnerable as their habitat extent and quality is still largely viable, with a small number of locations under severe fragmentation, considering most of Southeast Asia is still heavily covered by tropical dense lowland rainforests.
