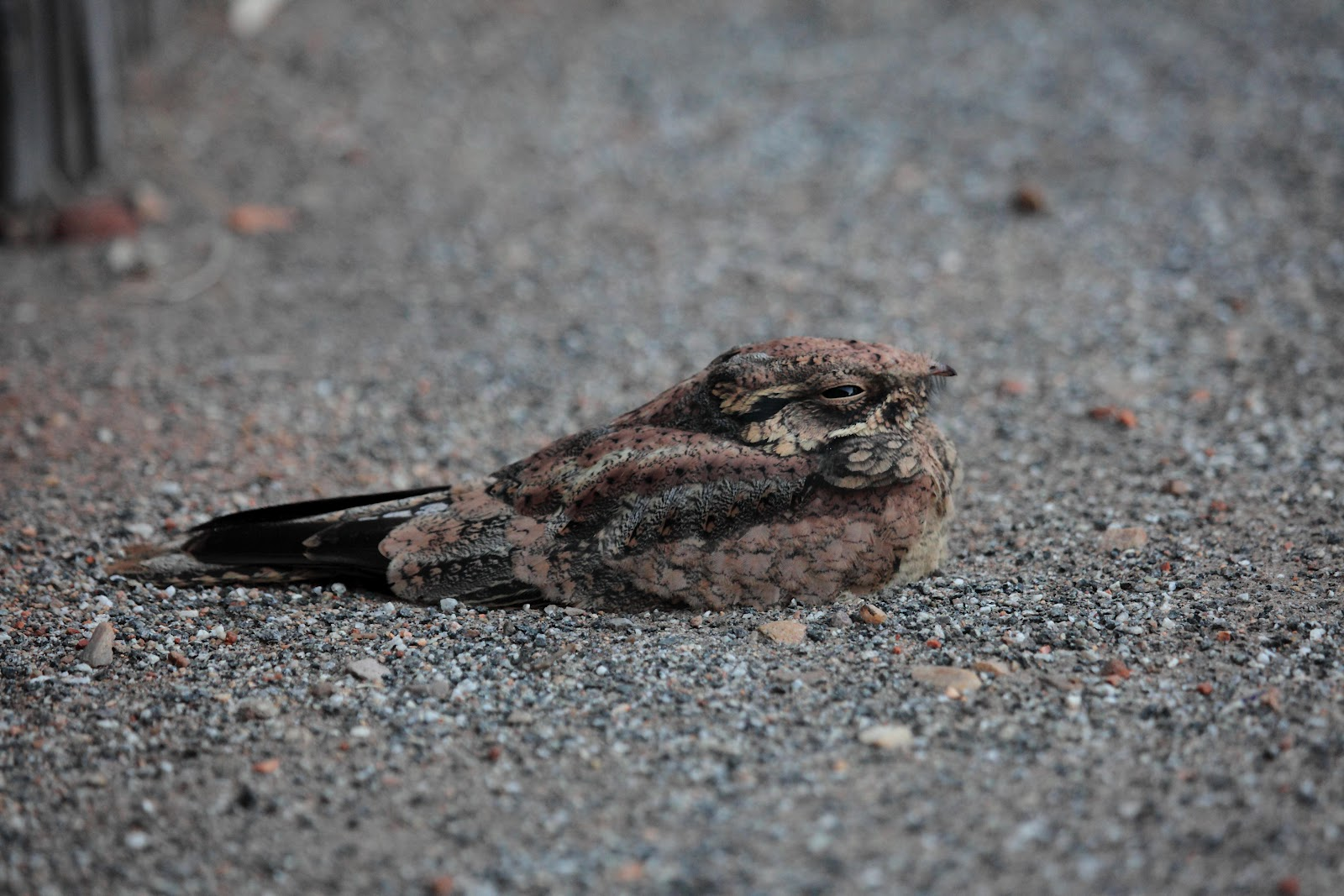

Conservation status
- Least Concern (IUCN 3.1)

Scientific classification
- Kingdom: Animalia
- Phylum: Chordata
- Class: Aves
- Order: Caprimulgiformes
- Family: Caprimulgidae
- Genus: Eurostopodus
- Species: E. argus

Binomial name
- Eurostopodus argus Hartert, 1892

= Spotted nightjar =

Species of bird

The spotted nightjar or spotted eared-nightjar (Eurostopodus argus) is a species of nightjar in the family Caprimulgidae. It inhabits much of mainland Australia and has also been found in several Indonesian islands. Its natural habitats are open forests and woodlands, scrub, spinifex and tussock grassland, savannah woodland and mangroves.

Spotted nightjars are larger and more colorful than other species of nightjar, and are known for their intricately flecked plumage patterns which allow them to camouflage well against the ground. Adult spotted nightjar have large white spots on four outer primary feathers, lacking the white tail markings of the more tropical large-tailed nightjar.

Spotted nightjars are nocturnal and insectivorous, and primarily roost on the ground, rarely perching in trees. They tend to both eat and drink while in flight, skimming along the surface of water holes in order to do so.

== Taxonomy ==
The spotted nightjar was formally described in 1892 by the German ornithologist Ernst Hartert. He amended the John Gould's genus name from Eurostopodus to Eurostopus, an amendment that has not been accepted, and coined the binomial name Eurostopus argus. Hartert specified the habitat as "Australia, Aru Islands and probably New Zealand". The type locality has been restricted to Parramatta in New South Wales. The specific epithet is from Argus Panoptes, a character in Greek mythology. The species is monotypic: no subspecies are recognised.

The Gamilaraay and Yuwaalaraay people of northern New South Wales use onomatopoeic name buugudaguda for this species.

The order Caprimulgiformes includes four families: oilbirds, frogmouths, potoos, and the nightjars.

== Distribution ==
The spotted nightjar occurs across most of mainland Australia, although it is generally absent east and south of the Great Dividing Range along the eastern seaboard from central Queensland to southeast South Australia and does not occur in Tasmania. Individuals may be locally nomadic or sedentary in northern regions, while southern birds are partially sedentary or migratory, wintering in northern Australia from May to September. The species may also winter on Indonesian islands in the Banda Sea, possibly for some individuals as a result of overshooting, with vagrants recorded as far north as Irian Jaya.

== Habitat ==
The spotted nightjar occurs in a variety of habitats from deserts to mangroves, generally preferring warmer, drier country than areas with more humid, cooler climates. Habitat types include savannah woodland; low open sclerophyll forest; mallee; mulga and acacia scrubland as well as spinifex and tussock grasslands. The species has also been recorded in relatively harsh environments including gibber plains, semi deserts and deserts. The species generally avoids dense grasslands and tall, closed forest. Winter habitats on Indonesian islands include savannahs, grasslands and the edges of rainforests.

== Description ==
One of the larger and more colourful of the nightjars, the intricate, heavily spotted and flecked patterns of the spotted nightjar enable it to blend perfectly where red, grew or brown soils are strewn with rocks, leaves, branches and twigs. Similar in appearance to two other Australian nightjar species, the large-tailed nightjar (Caprimulgus macrurus) and white-throated nightjar (Eurostopodus mystacalis), an adult spotted nightjar in flight displays large white spots on four outer primary feathers, lacking the white tail markings of the more tropical large-tailed nightjar. Adult body length is 25–28 cm. Adult males weigh 81-132 g while adult females are slightly smaller (74–123 g). Adult wingspan is 20.5-23.9 cm; tail length is 13.4-16.8 cm and bill length is 1.5-2.5 cm. The spotted nightjar's bill is flesh-brown to blackish, occasionally paler nearer to the gape of the lower mandible. The iris is brown to very dark brown; legs and feet are brown with darker claws.

=== Plumage ===
An adult spotted nightjar's head is speckled grey, with black central crown feathers and rufous to buff edges, while the sides of the head are blackish with tawny spots. The hind-neck is a rufous or buff collar often flecked with black marks. Upper parts are mid-grey with tawny or rufous and black streaks. Wing-coverts are speckled grey to blackish, often with pronounced buff to rufous spots. Four outermost primary wing-covert feathers feature white patches forming a distinctive speculum. The mid-throat has a pair of large oval white patches, while the upper throat is blackish with buff spots. The tawny lower throat and breast feature blackish-brown bars often flecked with grey, while underparts are tawny to ochre. Although the species is generally considered monotypic, adult females may tend to be a slightly lighter and paler tawny colour around the back, under-parts and collar, while also having slightly less prominent white markings on the outer wing-coverts. Juveniles have finely patterned upper parts and are redder overall than adults, with a single narrow black central stripe along the crown. The white outer wing-covert patterns are smaller and less pronounced, usually surrounded with ochre margins. The juvenile's breast is greyer and more finely mottled with dusky bars extending onto the belly. Downy young hatch with a uniform cover of short, reddish-brown down, shortly after which they moult into their juvenile plumage.

== Behaviour ==
A crepuscular/nocturnal species most active after dark and before dawn, spotted nightjars are usually observed roosting, walking or running along the ground and are rarely seen perching in trees. They are often found on roads at night and have been observed hawking insects with highly maneuverable flight around campfires, artificial lighting and flowering bushes. When flushed, individuals may initially fly only a short distance before landing, but when facing more persistent threats may fly further away beyond sight. If threatened while brooding, the spotted nightjar may begin hissing, opening its bill widely and spreading its wings and tail in a defensive posture or distraction display. The species typically roosts in partly shaded sites, often camouflaged amongst leaf litter or on stony ground. They manage to endure high temperatures during the hottest periods by gular-fluttering (evaporative cooling) and by keeping their backs to the sun, while also maintaining relatively low metabolic rates. While the species generally occurs singularly, flocks of up to 15 birds have been observed during migration.

=== Voice ===
A typical breeding call of the spotted nightjar involves about 9-12 notes, ascending in frequency and pitch, then proceeded by a series of gobbling sounds. When on ground, approaching their nesting area, birds may emit frog-like croaking and low cooing noises. Its melodic territorial song has a duration of 4–6 seconds, beginning 2-5 upwardly pitched notes, each becoming more rapid, followed by a quick succession of 8-15 high pitched double notes.

=== Diet ===
Spotted nightjars hawk insects and feed on the wing, often hunting at relatively low levels within 20–30 m of the ground. The species has been observed drinking water on the wing by skimming over water holes. They may also obtain preformed water from their insect prey. Spotted nightjars are thought to be almost exclusively insectivorous. Prey species include bugs; beetles; moths; winged ants; grasshoppers; locusts; lacewings and mantids.

=== Breeding ===
Breeding usually takes place between September and December, with northern populations breeding earlier than those in the south. In central Australia, seasons are less clearly defined, such that breeding tends to occur after significant rain events. Adults do not build a nest, instead a single pale yellow-green egg with purple-brown blotches is laid on the ground among leaf litter, twigs, grass and stones, usually making detection of sitting adults difficult. Both parents are understood to contribute to incubating the egg over a period of around 30 days. Chicks are able to walk within a short period after hatching and are able to flutter over short distances around 20 days, becoming more or less independent after 30 days. In favourable conditions, brooding females may lay a second egg after their chick is around 22 days old. A female has been recorded laying as many as five eggs, successfully rearing two broods during a single season.

== Status and conservation ==
Previously considered moderately abundant across inland and northern areas, the spotted nightjar may be becoming more rare, particularly in southern parts of its range as a result of habitat loss associated with land clearing, reduced productivity and overgrazing of remnant native vegetation. Predation by feral cats and foxes is also likely to be significantly impacting abundance in some areas. The species is now listed among Australia's 26 declining woodland birds.
