= New Caledonian nightjar =

Conservation status
- Critically endangered, possibly extinct (IUCN 3.1)

Scientific classification
- Kingdom: Animalia
- Phylum: Chordata
- Class: Aves
- Order: Caprimulgiformes
- Family: Caprimulgidae
- Genus: Eurostopodus
- Species: E. exul

Binomial name
- Eurostopodus exul Mayr, 1941

Species of bird

The New Caledonian nightjar (Eurostopodus exul) is a poorly known species of nightjar in the family Caprimulgidae. It is endemic to New Caledonia.

== Description ==
The species was first described by Ernst Mayr in 1941, from a specimen collected in New Caledonia on the Whitney South Sea Expedition in 1939. Mayr initially described the species as Eurostopodus mystacalis exul, believing it to be a subspecies of white-throated nightjar.

Based on the type specimen, this nightjar has silvery-grey plumage with dark blotches and streaks, with a black crown and dark, grey-brown underparts. It lacks the nuchal collar seen in some Caprimulgiformes, but does display a white patch on its throat.

== Conservation ==
It is considered possibly extinct, as it is known only from the holotype which was collected in 1939. The specimen was of a bird taken in coastal savanna. The possibility of decline in population was probably caused by predation by introduced cats and rats, alongside habitat destruction.
