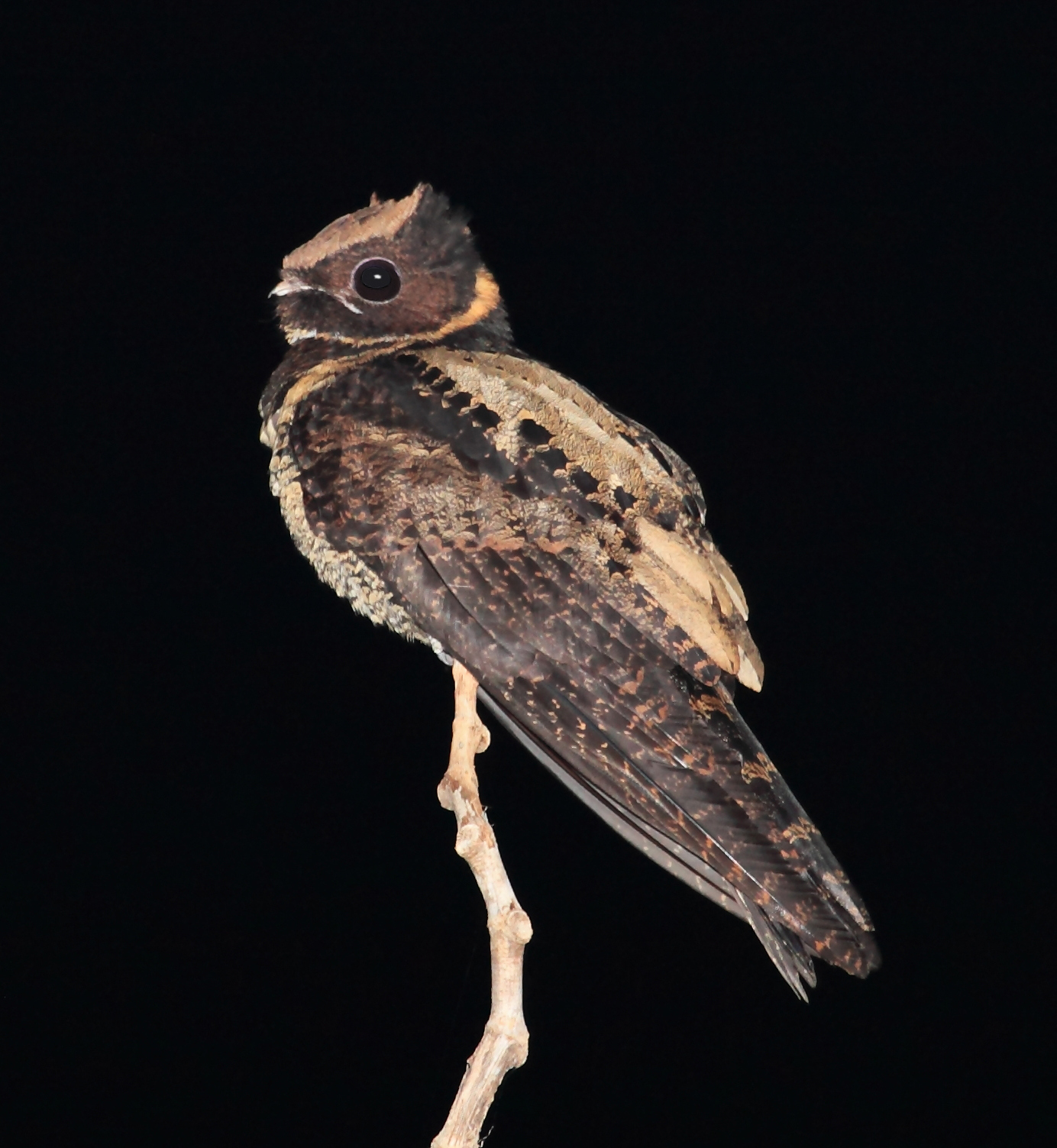
- L. m. macropterus from Sulawesi

Conservation status
- Least Concern (IUCN 3.1)

Scientific classification
- Kingdom: Animalia
- Phylum: Chordata
- Class: Aves
- Order: Caprimulgiformes
- Family: Caprimulgidae
- Genus: Lyncornis
- Species: L. macrotis

Binomial name
- Lyncornis macrotis (Vigors, 1831)

Synonyms
- Eurostopodus mindanensis

Audio
- Call of L. m. bourdilloni recorded in Vazhachal, Kerala, India

= Great eared nightjar =

Species of bird

The great eared nightjar (Lyncornis macrotis) is a species of nightjar in the genus Lyncornis. It is found in southwest India and in parts of Southeast Asia. This very large nightjar has long barred wings, a barred tail and long ear-tufts which are often recumbent. It has a white throat band but has no white on its wings or on its tail.

== Taxonomy ==
The great eared nightjar was formally described in 1831 by the Irish zoologist Nicholas Aylward Vigors based on a sample collected in the neighbourhood of Manila in the Philippines. Vigors coined the binomial name Caprimulgus macrotis. The great eared nightjar was formerly placed in the genus Eurostopodus. It and the closely related Malaysian eared nightjar were moved to the resurrected genus Lyncornis based on the results of a molecular phylogenetic study published in 2010 that found large genetic differences between the great eared nightjar and other species in Eurostopodus. The genus name Lyncornis combines the Ancient Greek λύγξ /lunx/ (meaning "lynx") with ὄρνις /ornis/, meaning "bird". The specific epithet macrotis is from the Ancient Greek μακρὦτης /makrōtēs/, meaning "long-eared" (from μακρός /makros/ meaning "long" and οὖς /ous/ meaning "ear").

Five subspecies are recognised:

- Lyncornis macrotis cerviniceps Gould, 1838 – Bangladesh and northeastern India to southern China, Indochina and northern Malay Peninsula.
- Lyncornis macrotis bourdilloni Hume, 1875 – southwestern India.
- Lyncornis macrotis macrotis (Vigors, 1831) – Philippines (except far west of Visayas; Palawan group, and Sulu Archipelago).
- Lyncornis macrotis jacobsoni Junge, 1936 – Simeulue (west of north Sumatra).
- Lyncornis macrotis macropterus Bonaparte, 1850 – Sulawesi, Sangihe and Talaud Islands (northeast of Sulawesi), Banggai and Sula Island (east of Sulawesi).

== Description ==
The great eared nightjar is the largest species in the family in terms of length, which can range from 31 to 41 cm (12 to 16 in). Males weigh an average of 131 g (4.6 oz) and females weigh an average of 151 g (5.3 oz), making it the second heaviest species in the family after the nacunda nighthawk. The nightjar has grey-brown, mottled, streaked and stripey plumage. They also have pointed wings and long tails as well as short wide beaks that open to around 120°.

== Distribution and habitat ==
It is found in South Asia and Southeast Asia with populations in the Western Ghats and Sri Lanka, Bangladesh, India, Indonesia, Laos, Malaysia, Myanmar, Southwest China, the Philippines, Thailand, and Vietnam. Its natural habitat is subtropical or moist lowland tropical forests.

== Behaviour ==
Like other nightjars they are nocturnal, active at dusk and at night. They have a distinctive call which includes a sharp tsiik followed by a pause and a two-syllable ba-haaww.

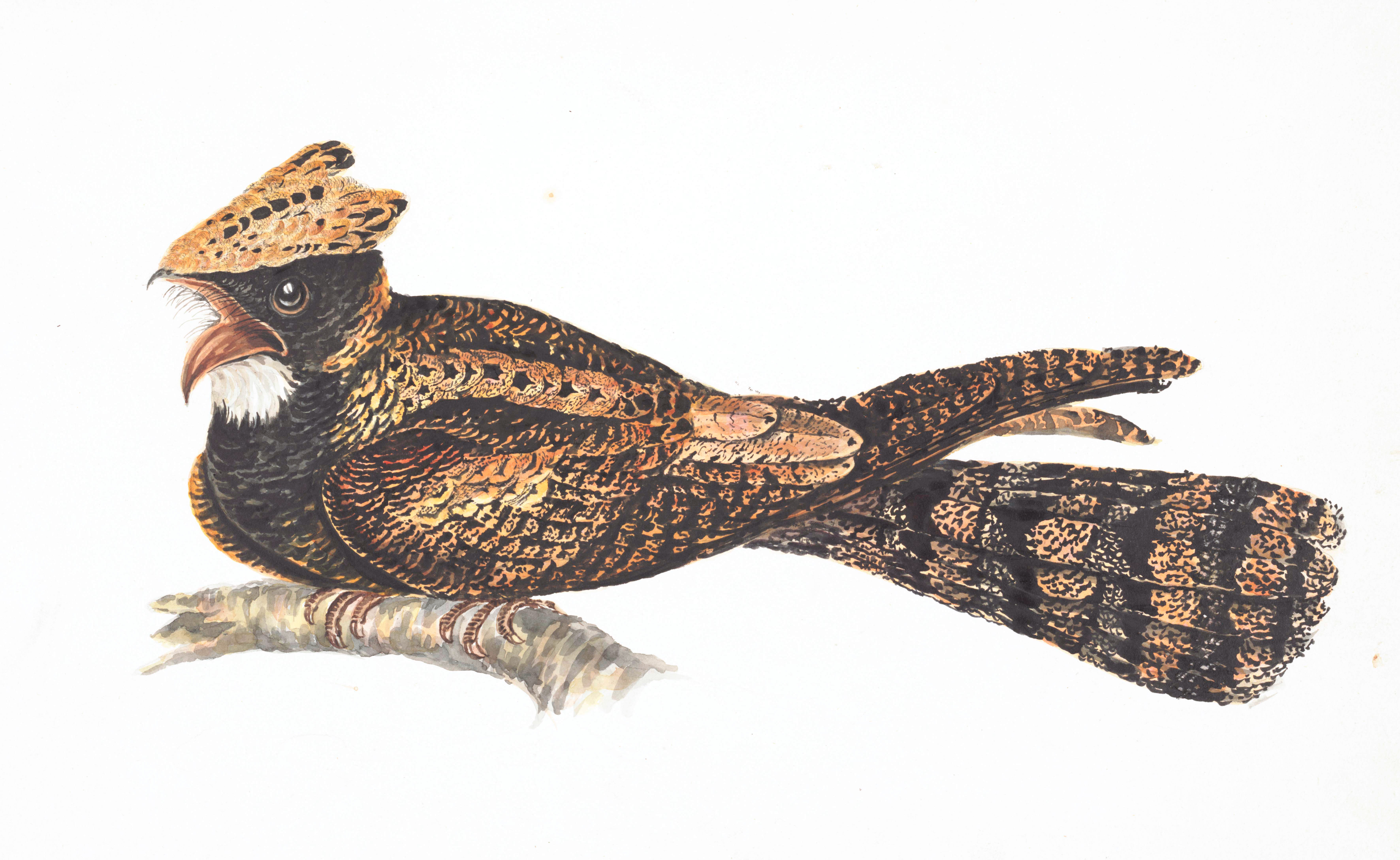
Painting by Elizabeth Gwillim c. 1801

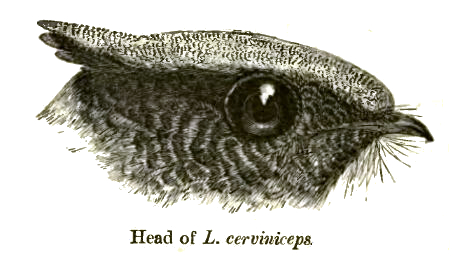
Head of L. m. cerviniceps

=== Breeding ===
The nest is a scrape on the ground and the clutch consists of a single egg. The chick is well camouflaged among leaf litter.
