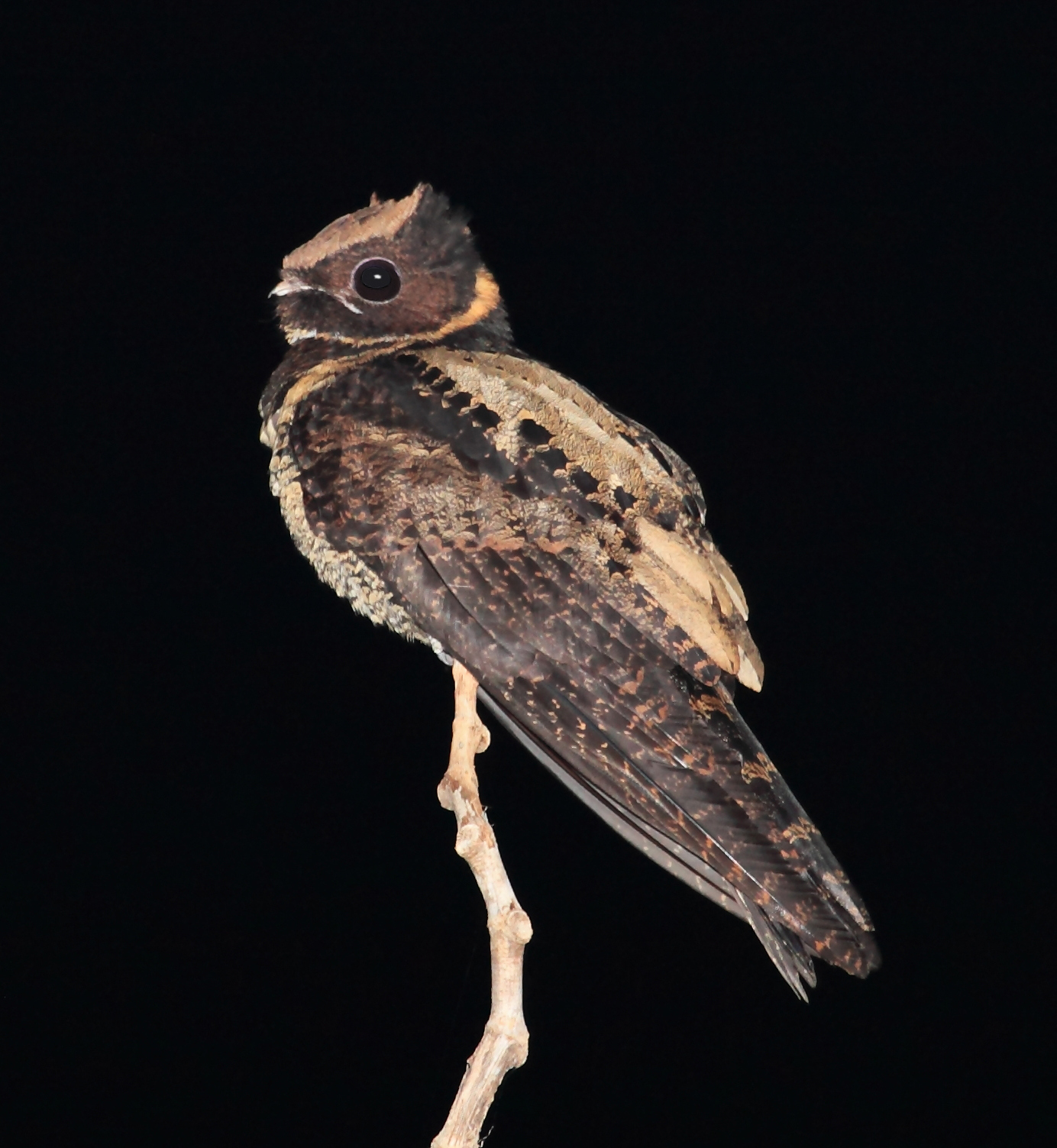
- Great eared nightjar (Lyncornis macrotis)

Scientific classification
- Kingdom: Animalia
- Phylum: Chordata
- Class: Aves
- Order: Caprimulgiformes
- Family: Caprimulgidae
- Genus: Lyncornis; Gould, 1838

Type species
- Lyncornis cerviniceps (great eared nightjar) Gould, 1838

= Lyncornis =

Genus of birds

Lyncornis is a genus of nightjars in the nightjar family Caprimulgidae that are found is South and Southeast Asia. The English name "eared nightjar" refers to the two tufts of feathers on their head.

== Taxonomy ==
The genus Lyncornis was introduced in 1838 by the English ornithologist John Gould with Lyncornis cerviniceps Gould 1838 as the type species. This taxon is now treated as a subspecies of the great eared nightjar. The genus name combines the Ancient Greek lunx, lunkos meaning "lynx" with ornis meaning "bird".

== Species ==
The genus contains two species:

| Image | Scientific name | Common name | Distribution |
|---|---|---|---|
| | Lyncornis temminckii | Malayan eared nightjar | Brunei, Indonesia, Malaysia, Singapore, and Thailand |
| | Lyncornis macrotis | Great eared nightjar | Sri Lanka Bangladesh, India, Indonesia, Laos, Malaysia, Myanmar, the Philippines, Thailand, and Vietnam |

These two species were formerly placed in the genus Eurostopodus. They were moved to the resurrected genus Lyncornis based on the results of a molecular phylogenetic study published in 2010 that found large genetic differences between the great eared nightjar and the other species in Eurostopodus.
