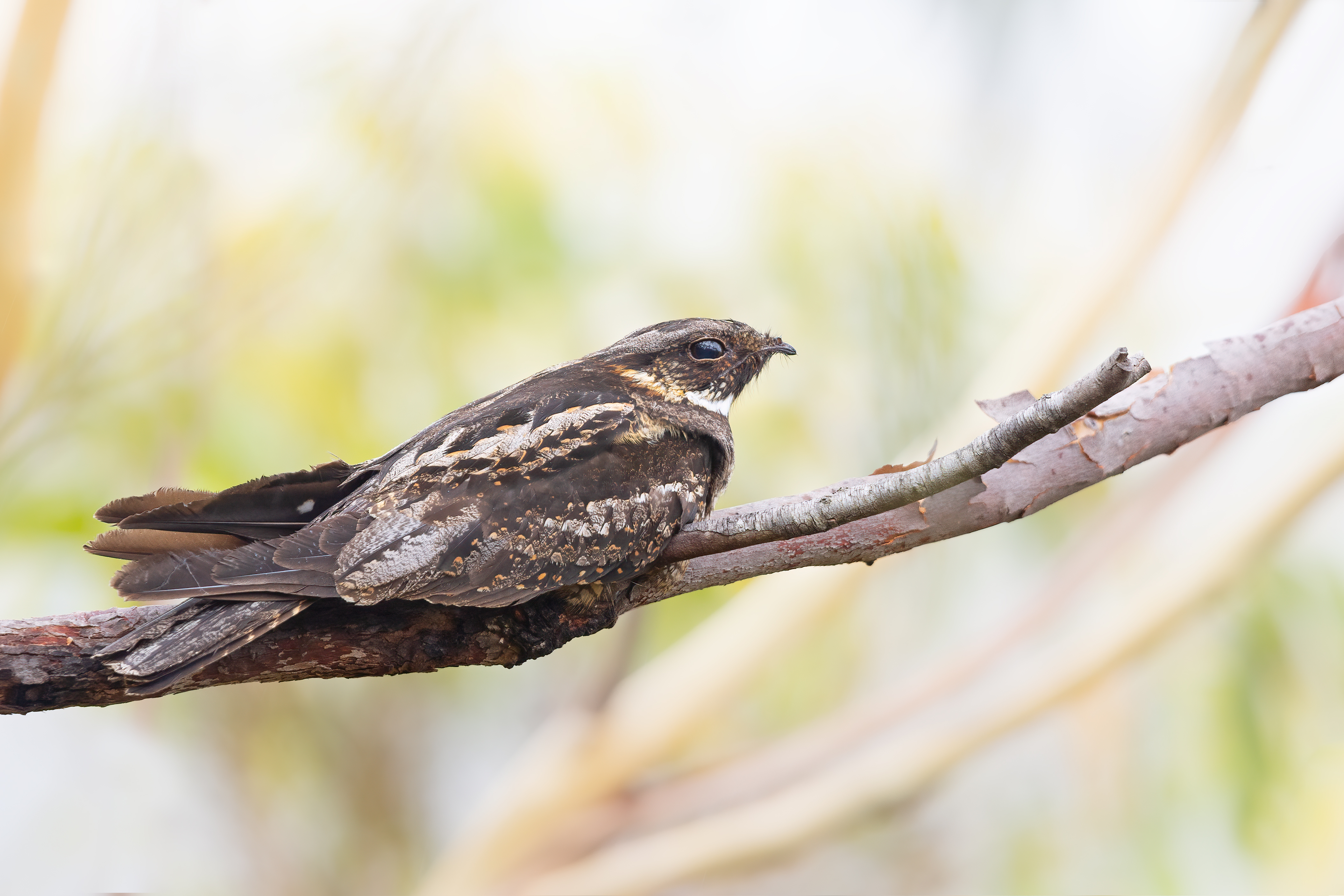

Conservation status
- Least Concern (IUCN 3.1)

Scientific classification
- Kingdom: Animalia
- Phylum: Chordata
- Class: Aves
- Order: Caprimulgiformes
- Family: Caprimulgidae
- Genus: Eurostopodus
- Species: E. mystacalis

Binomial name
- Eurostopodus mystacalis (Temminck, 1826)

Synonyms
- White-throated Goat-sucker, White-throated eared nightjar

= White-throated nightjar =

Species of bird

The white-throated nightjar or white-throated eared nightjar (Eurostopodus mystacalis) is a species of nightjar in the family Caprimulgidae. It is endemic to eastern Australia; it is a non-breeding winter visitor in Papua New Guinea. Its natural habitat is subtropical or tropical dry forests.

== Taxonomy ==
The white-throated nightjar was formerly known as Eurostopodus albogularis but was later reclassified to E. mystacalis. Some texts may still refer to this species as Eurostopodus mystacalis albogularis. Before 2002, this species was regarded as conspecific with New Caledonian nightjar Eurostopodus exul and Solomons nightjar Eurostopodus nigripennis. However, later research separated the three into their own species based on differences in calls and song, and morphology. Since then, E. mystacalis has remained monotypic.

=== Etymology ===
The genus name Eurostopodus is derived from the Greek words eurostos meaning 'strong' and podos or pous meaning 'foot', while the species name mystacalis is derived from Latin and means 'moustache'.

== Description ==
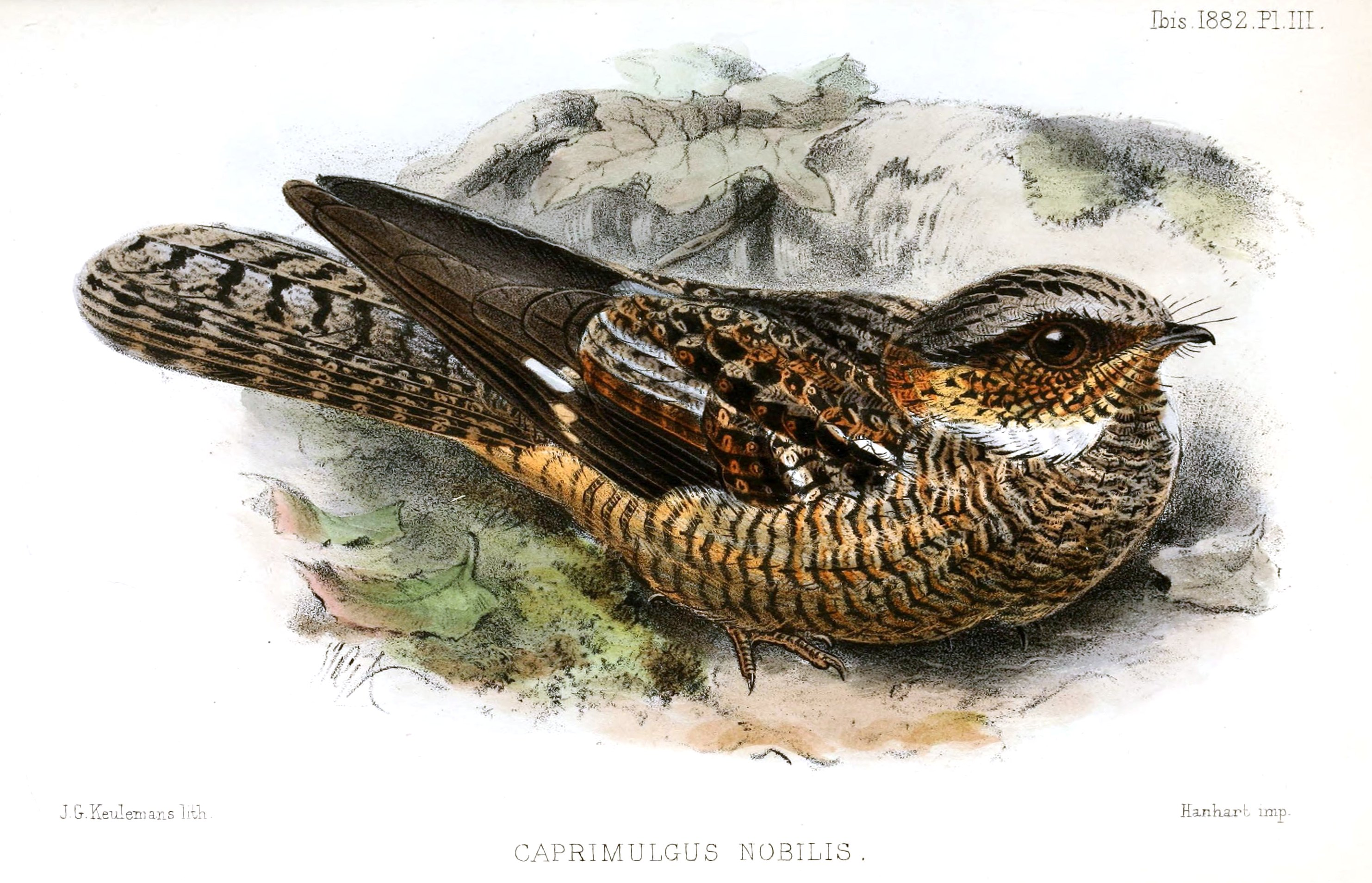
Drawing of white-throated nightjar

E. mystacalis is the largest Australian nightjar species and measures around 30–37 cm. Males and females are very similar in appearance and display a dark variegated body. The upper body and wings are greyish-brown with broad blackish-brown streaks and spots. The underbody is spotted brown or greyish white and barred rufous. The upper part of the wing is greyish-white but speckled brownish-black as well. Its neck is buff-coloured with a large white patch on either side of its throat, making it appear as if it is wearing a collar. The four outermost primaries have a distinct white spot that help to differentiate it from similar looking nightjars. Its tail is brown with black speckles and absent of any white. The beak is greyish black and the legs are dark brown and short making travel on ground difficult for this bird.

When in flight, the wings are long, pointed and held above its head. This species bounces buoyantly while flying and takes frequent glides accompanied by a double wing beat.

== Distribution and habitat ==
The white-throated nightjar is a species endemic to eastern Australia. Birds reside in northeast Australia throughout the year and travel to the south to breed. The breeding range is in Australia east of the Great Dividing Range. Birds are most abundant in New South Wales and Queensland. During the autumn and winter, birds migrate from February until April to Papua New Guinea as non-breeding visitors. Although many overwinter outside of Australia, many also remain in north and central Queensland all year long.

This species is able inhabit a wide variety of habitats but is most commonly found in dry low-elevation forests. They prefer to nest and roost in dry sclerophyll woodlands with sparse and discontinuous understory. Many individuals have been found to specifically live in woodlands that have experienced disturbances such as forest fires. In New South Wales, birds have been found inhabiting the edges of rainforests and mangroves. Those that winter in New Guinea occur in savannas, open grasslands, forest edges, marshlands and gardens. Wintering birds may also be found along the beaches of the Solomon Islands.

== Behaviour ==
=== Vocalisations ===
White-throated nightjars are more often heard than seen. They have a distinct song that help distinguish it from the species it was previously conspecific with. Mostly made by males, their song is composed of a series of rapidly ascending bubbling notes. Their song is described as wow-wow-wow-wow-ho-ho ho-ho-o-o-O containing 9-12 notes and lasting for three to six seconds. It puffs out its throat-patch while singing. Females can occasionally also sing. This song is mostly heard during dawn or dusk, and subsides once the breeding season is over.

Their call is also very distinct described as an ascending whook whook whook for about ten notes which then accelerates into a 'cackle of laughter'.

Adults communicate to their young using low husky notes. In response, chicks make harsh khaah notes but will cheep when asking for food. If chicks or the nest is threatened, parents can make distracting barks, tocks and hisses. During courtship, both females and males make low croaks and bill snaps to each other.

=== Diet ===
It is an aerial hunter that comes out to forage primarily at night. They employ hawking and target a wide variety of flying insects. Large moths make up the bulk of its diet, though also eating mantises, crickets and grasshoppers, beetles, and winged ants. It may form foraging groups of 20 or more individuals especially when on migration. When migrating, birds travel during the day so they can maximize their time hunting at night.

=== Reproduction ===
The breeding season occurs from September to February but differs slightly depending on the region. For birds in southeastern Australia it is mainly from October to December. Courtship involves males chasing females, displays from the males, and vocal exchanges between both sexes. Males will often land on low branches and wave its wings up and down while calling.

White-throated nightjars do not make nests and instead lay their eggs directly onto leaf litter or bare soil. The eggs are pale yellow with purplish-brown splotches and clutch size is one. Their preferred nesting sites are on hilltops or stony ridges and they often reuse the same nesting sites every year. Both sexes are involved in parenting and take turns incubating the egg. During the day, the female will incubate the egg while the male rests nearby. Then at night, the male will take over incubation, allowing the female to hunt for food. If the nest or nestling are threatened, parents put on a variety of distractions that include short flights, vocal hisses and barks, and flicking tail movements while on the ground. Incubation lasts from 29 to 33 days and newly hatched chicks are precocial. Chicks are quite capable and are mobile starting on the first day. After approximately 30 days, the chick fledges. Three weeks after the first egg hatches, females may lay another egg. If an egg is lost females will lay another egg to replace it and can lay up to 5 eggs per breeding season.

== Conservation ==
Although it is currently listed as least concern, the overall trend in their population is decreasing. They often feed along the sides of roads at night, resulting in fatal traffic collisions. Feral cats and dogs prey upon both adults and chicks. Fire ants (Wasmannia auropunctata) introduced in the 1970s have spread into its native range and threaten nestlings. Increasing bushfires have affected large parts of the Melaleuca savanna, destroying habitable sites. The current estimate of individuals is unknown.
