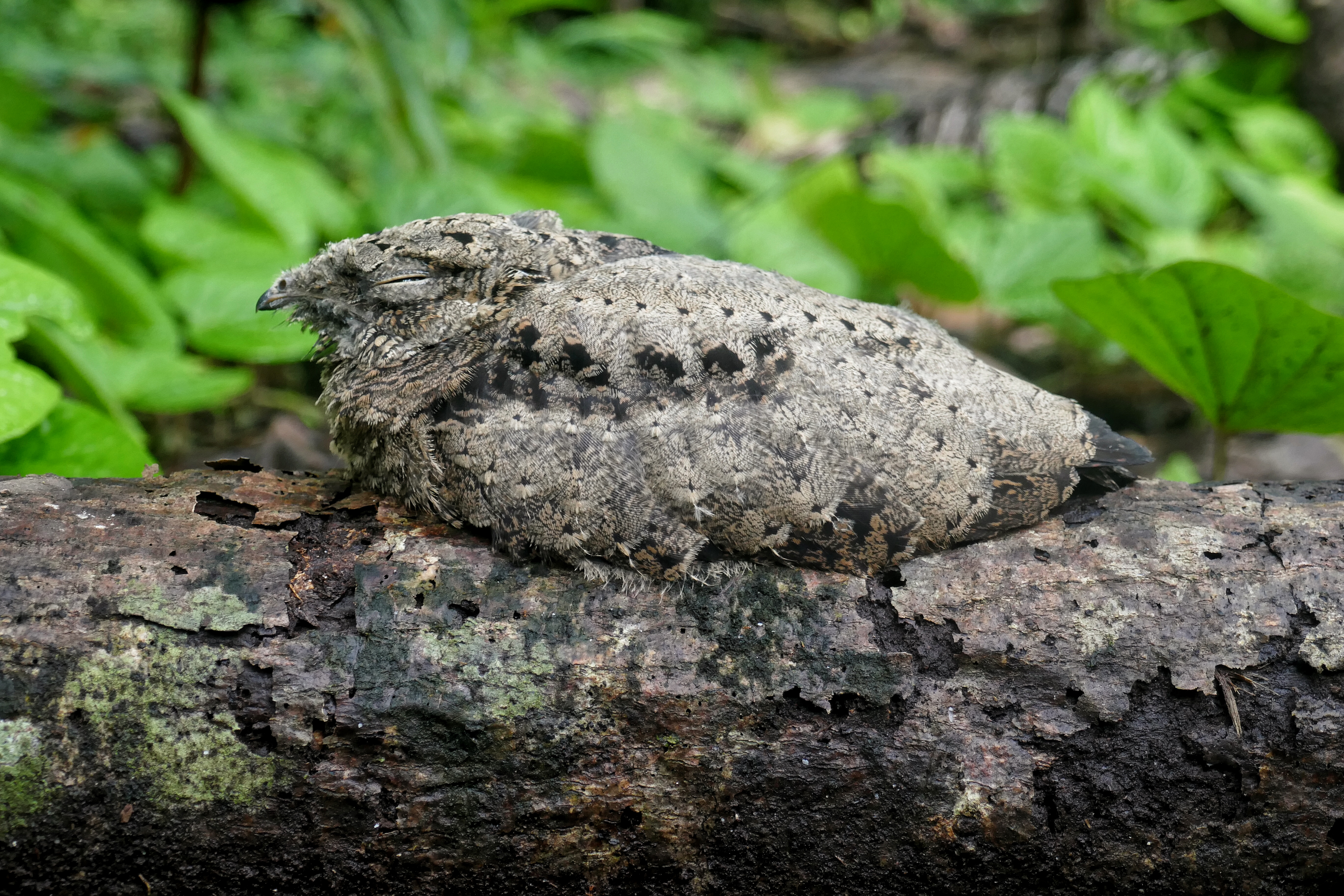

Conservation status
- Vulnerable (IUCN 3.1)

Scientific classification
- Kingdom: Animalia
- Phylum: Chordata
- Class: Aves
- Clade: Strisores
- Order: Caprimulgiformes
- Family: Caprimulgidae
- Genus: Eurostopodus
- Species: E. nigripennis

Binomial name
- Eurostopodus nigripennis Ramsay, 1882

= Solomons nightjar =

Species of bird

The Solomons nightjar (Eurostopodus nigripennis) is a species of nightjar in the family Caprimulgidae. It is found in the Solomon Islands archipelago. Its natural habitat is subtropical or tropical dry forests. It avoids human activity, and (like other nightjars) is nocturnal.

It was recently split from the white-throated nightjar based on differences in vocalizations, morphology, and range.

Juvenile plumage is duller than that of adults.

It feeds on flying insects.

== Breeding and Nesting ==
Solomons nightjars typically nest on flat ground 20-30m from the ocean in a mix of leaf litter, sand, and limestone coral, with clutches of a single egg. Eggs are off-white with large blotched speckling. Nestlings are threatened by fire ants and feral cats.
