= Papuan nightjar =

Conservation status
- Least Concern (IUCN 3.1)

Scientific classification
- Kingdom: Animalia
- Phylum: Chordata
- Class: Aves
- Order: Caprimulgiformes
- Family: Caprimulgidae
- Genus: Eurostopodus
- Species: E. papuensis

Binomial name
- Eurostopodus papuensis (Schlegel, 1866)

Species of bird

The Papuan nightjar or Papuan eared-nightjar (Eurostopodus papuensis) is a species of nightjar in the family of Caprimulgidae. It is found in New Guinea and some surrounding islands. Its natural habitats are subtropical or tropical moist lowland forests and subtropical or tropical mangrove forests. It is widespread, occurring across 1,210,000 km^{2}, however its population is decreasing. Exact numbers are uncertain due to lack of data, but there is believed to be under 10,000 mature individuals (with a 10% decrease expected over the next decade mainly due to loss of tree cover, which it is heavily reliant on). Its diet consists mainly of insects.

== Taxonomy ==
The Papuan nightjar was originally described by Hermann Schlegel in 1886. It is in the order Caprimulgiformes, with contains the single family of Caprimulgidae (or nightjars). It is in the genus Eurostopodus.

== Habitat ==
Papuan Nightjars are widespread across New Guinea as well as a few surrounding islands. They reside and hunt mainly in lowland rainforest in clearings and openings with good ground cover, from sea-level to 400m.

== Description ==
The Papuan nightjar is between 28 and 35 cm long, weighting 0.11 kg (female) and 0.12 kg (male) with a wingspan of 55–65 cm. It has huge eyes, a white V on its throat, and is mottled brown and grey with specks of gold, made to mimic forest leaf litter. It is distinguished from other members of its family by a lack of white tail or wing markings.

== Behaviour ==
=== Breeding ===
Poorly know, but probably breed June—August. A clutch of a single egg is laid, generally in a clearing among undergrowth. The egg is placed directly on the ground or on leaf litter, with no nest. Eggs are elliptical, 32mm x 23·8–25 mm, pinkish brown with heavy hard and light brown blotching, and underlying grey patches. Incubated by the female during the day.

=== Feeding ===
Feeds by foraging while in flight in forest clearings or openings or over canopy, and by making sallies from the ground. Diet consists of moths and other insects.

=== Vocal behaviour ===
(Presumed) song of the male is a rapid coo-coo-coo; other calls include a low guttural chattering.

== Conservation Status ==
While the Papuan nightjar is least concern, this is due rather to its widespread nature and not to numbers, which are unknown. However it does seem scarce, and is presumably threatened by habitat loss and degradation.
