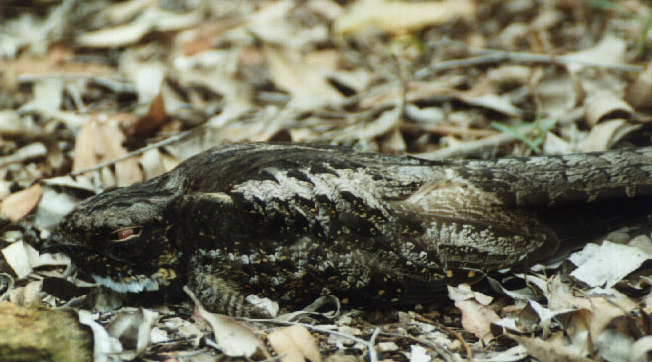
- White-throated nightjar (Eurostopodus mystacalis)

Scientific classification
- Kingdom: Animalia
- Phylum: Chordata
- Class: Aves
- Order: Caprimulgiformes
- Family: Caprimulgidae
- Genus: Eurostopodus; Gould, 1838

Type species
- Caprimulgus guttatus Vigors & Horsfield, 1827=Caprimulgus mystacalis Temminck, 1826

Species
- 7; see text

= Eurostopodus =

Genus of birds

Eurostopodus is a genus of nightjars in the nightjar family Caprimulgidae. This genus is distinctive among the Old World nightjars in lacking long rictal bristles. It also shows some features that are not shared with Caprimulginae and Chordeilinae, like having a larger size or the variable presence of ear-tufts, juveniles showing rufous plumage, long incubation periods and brown-reds and black spotted eggs.

== Taxonomy ==
The genus Eurostopodus was introduced in 1838 by the English ornithologist John Gould in his book A Synopsis of the Birds of Australia, and the Adjacent Islands. Gould listed two species in the genus but did not specify the type. In 1840 George Gray designated the type as Caprimulgus guttatus Vigors & Horsfield, 1827. This is a junior synonym of Caprimulgus mystacalis Temminck, 1826, the white-throated nightjar. The genus name Eurostopodus is derived from the Ancient Greek ευρωστος/eurōstos meaning "strong" or "stout" and πους/pous, ποδος/podos meaning "foot".

The following cladogram is based on a phylogenetic study by Jenna McCullough and collaborators published in 2025.

- Eurostopodus
  - - Archbold's nightjar (Eurostopodus archboldi)
    - Papuan nightjar (Eurostopodus papuensis)
  - - - Satanic nightjar (Eurostopodus diabolicus)
      - New Caledonian nightjar (Eurostopodus exul)
    - - Spotted nightjar (Eurostopodus argus)
      - - White-throated nightjar (Eurostopodus mystacalis)
        - Solomons nightjar (Eurostopodus nigripennis)

== Species ==
The genus contains the following seven species:

Image	Scientific name	Common name	Distribution
	Eurostopodus argus	Spotted nightjar	mainland Australia, Indonesian islands
	Eurostopodus mystacalis	White-throated nightjar	eastern Australia; Papua New Guinea
	Eurostopodus nigripennis	Solomons nightjar	Solomon Islands archipelago
	Eurostopodus exul	New Caledonian nightjar	New Caledonia. Possibly extinct.
	Eurostopodus diabolicus	Satanic nightjar	Sulawesi
	Eurostopodus papuensis	Papuan nightjar	New Guinea
	Eurostopodus archboldi	Archbold's nightjar	New Guinea
