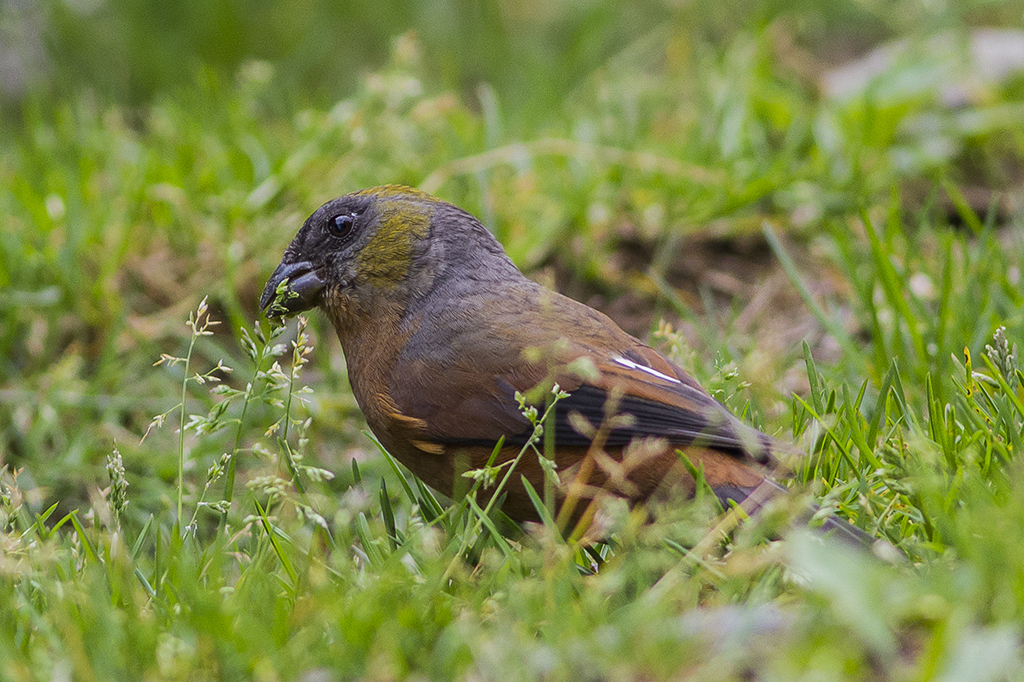
- Female (♀) from East Sikkim, India, Asia
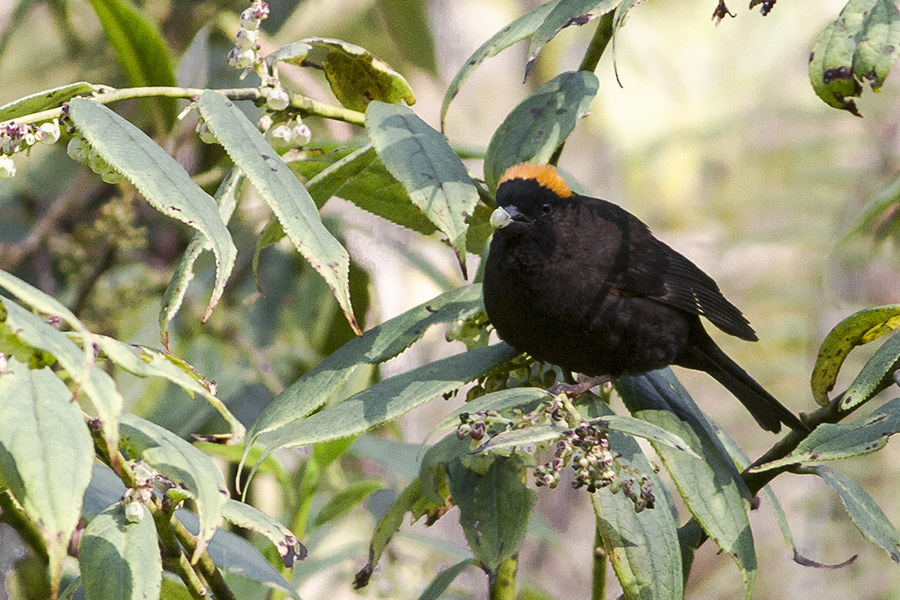
- Male (♂) from East Sikkim, India, Asia

Conservation status
- Least Concern (IUCN 3.1)

Scientific classification
- Kingdom: Animalia
- Phylum: Chordata
- Class: Aves
- Order: Passeriformes
- Family: Fringillidae
- Subfamily: Carduelinae
- Genus: Pyrrhoplectes; Hodgson, 1844
- Species: P. epauletta

Binomial name
- Pyrrhoplectes epauletta (Hodgson, 1836)

= Golden-naped finch =

Species of bird

The golden-naped finch (Pyrrhoplectes epauletta) is a species of finch in the family Fringillidae. It is in the monotypic genus Pyrrhoplectes.

It is found in Bhutan, China, India, Myanmar, and Nepal. Its natural habitat is temperate forest.

== Gallery ==
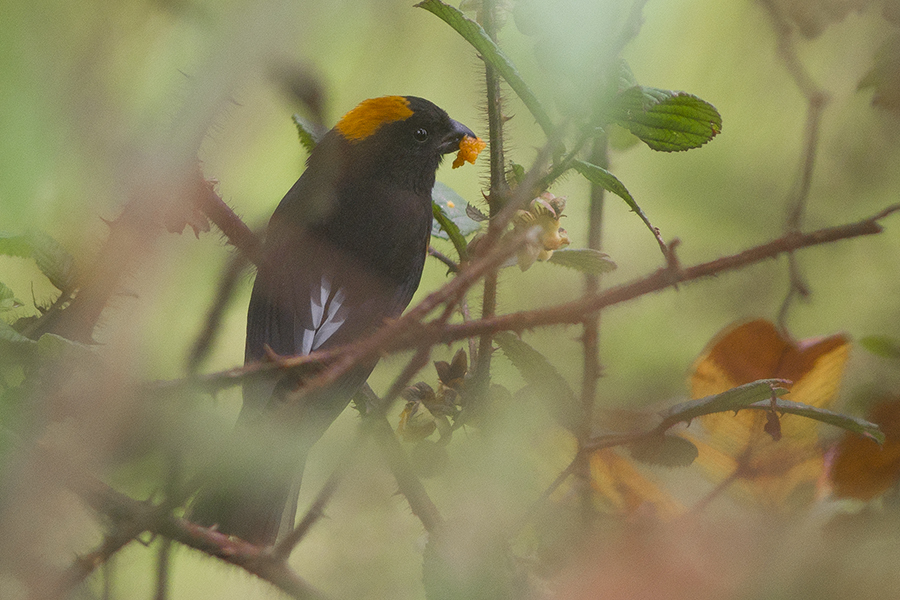
A male (♂) from Pangolakha Wildlife Sanctuary, Sikkim foraging on wild berries.

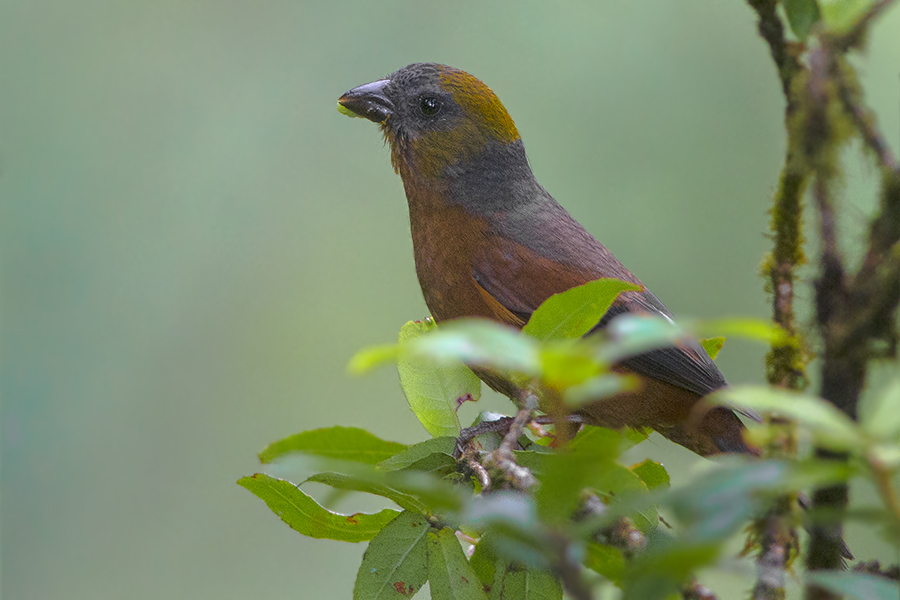
From Pangolakha Wildlife Sanctuary, East Sikkim, India.

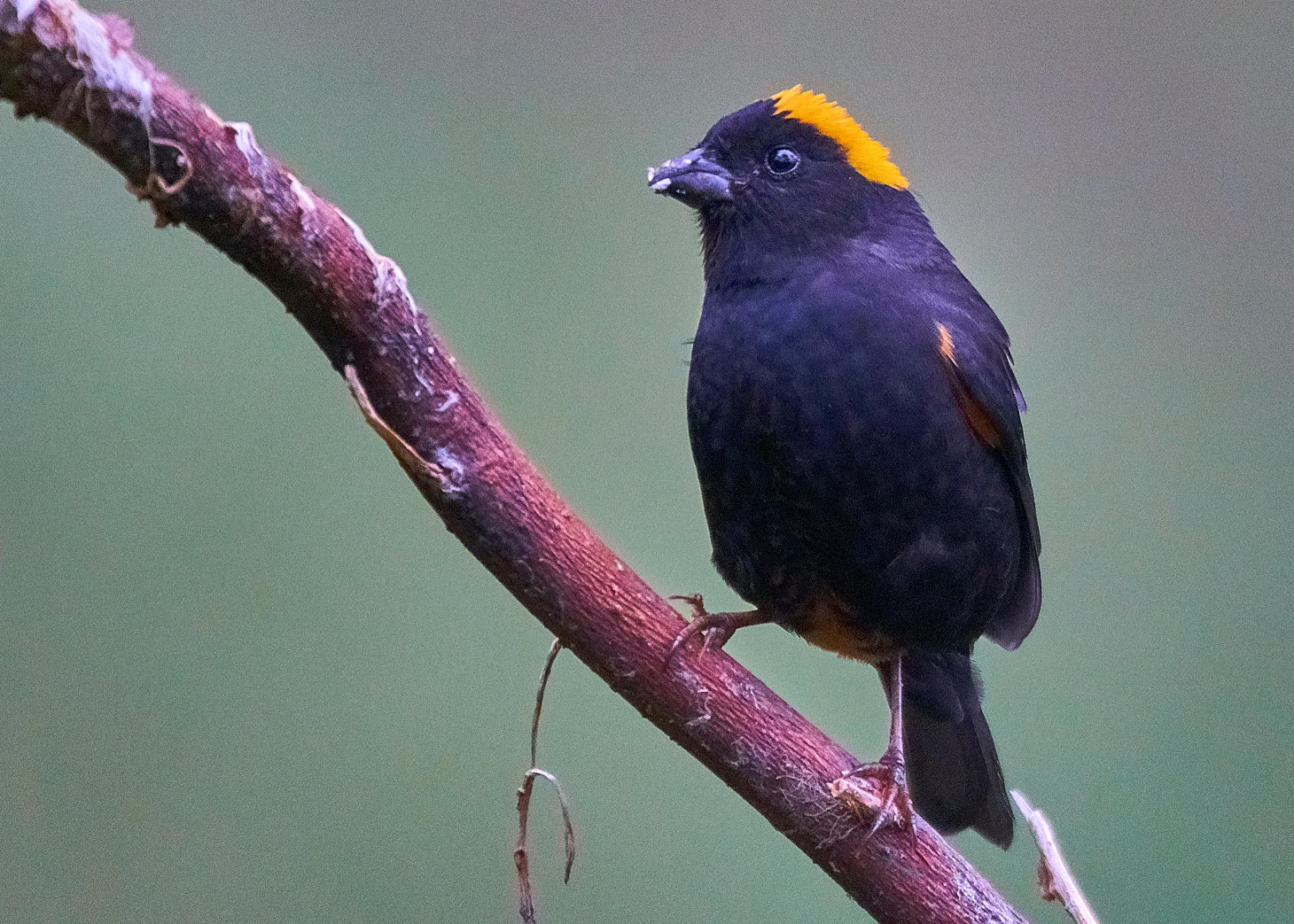
Golden-naped Finch at Lava, West Bengal, India
