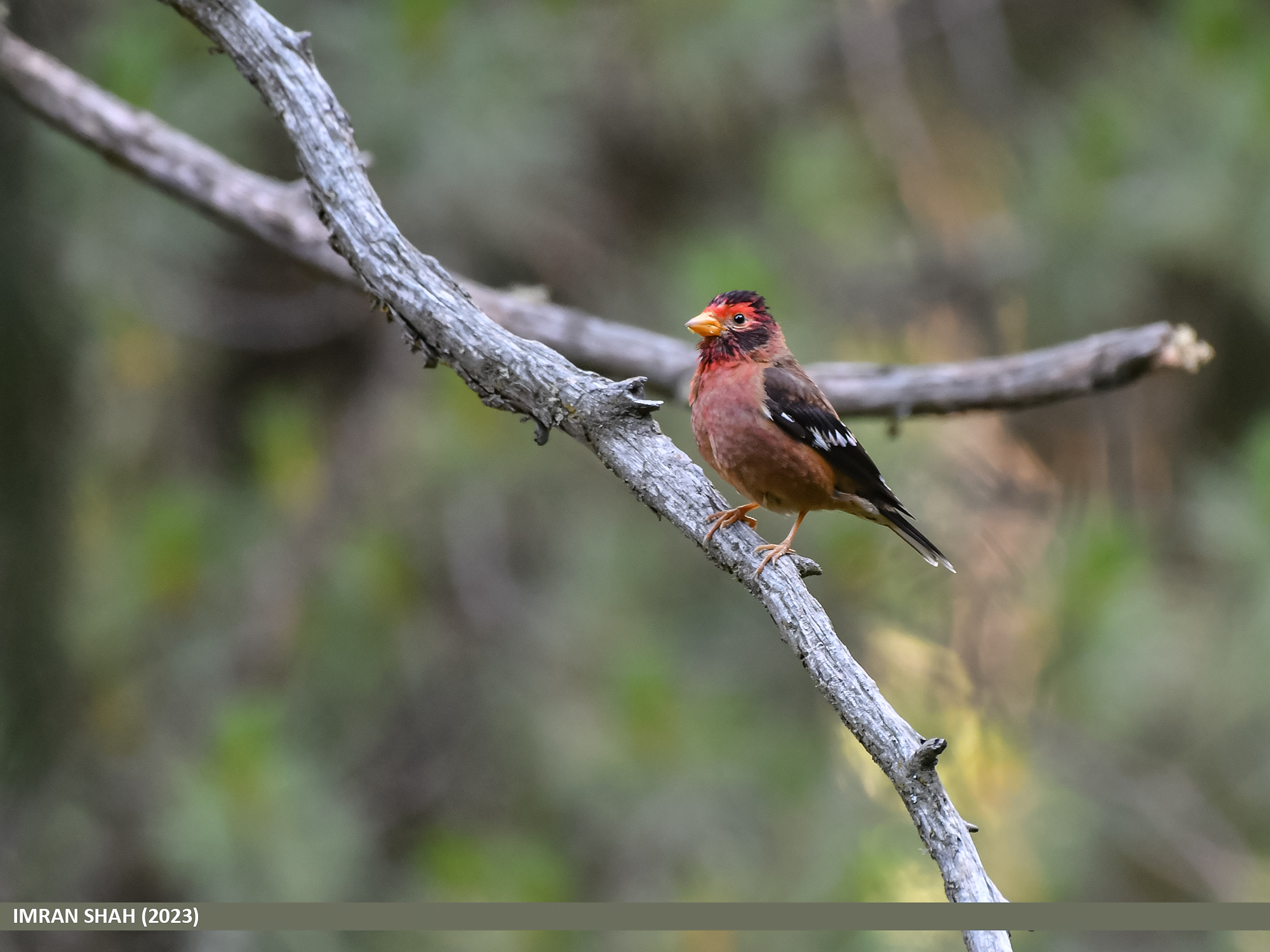

Conservation status
- Least Concern (IUCN 3.1)

Scientific classification
- Kingdom: Animalia
- Phylum: Chordata
- Class: Aves
- Order: Passeriformes
- Family: Fringillidae
- Subfamily: Carduelinae
- Genus: Callacanthis; Reichenbach, 1850
- Species: C. burtoni

Binomial name
- Callacanthis burtoni (Gould, 1838)

= Spectacled finch =

Species of bird

The spectacled finch (Callacanthis burtoni) is a species of finch in the family Fringillidae. It is native to the Safed Koh and southern slope of the Himalayas.

Its natural habitat is temperate forests with a lush landscape.

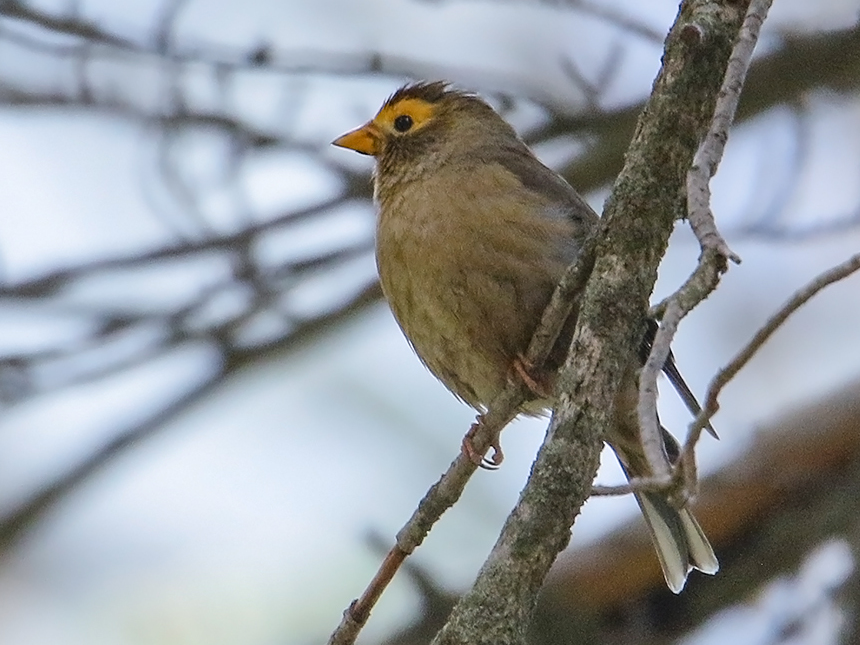
female bird

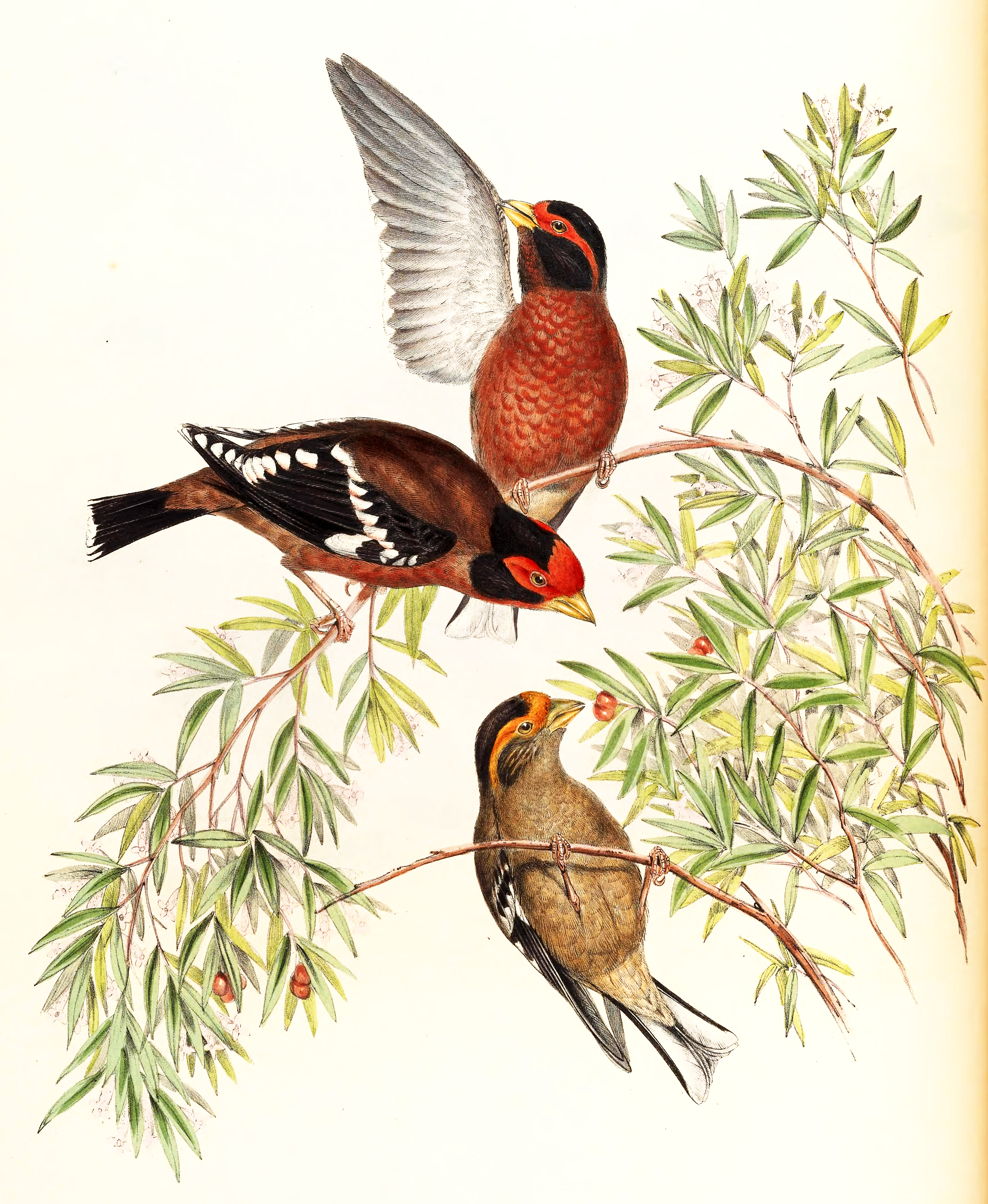
