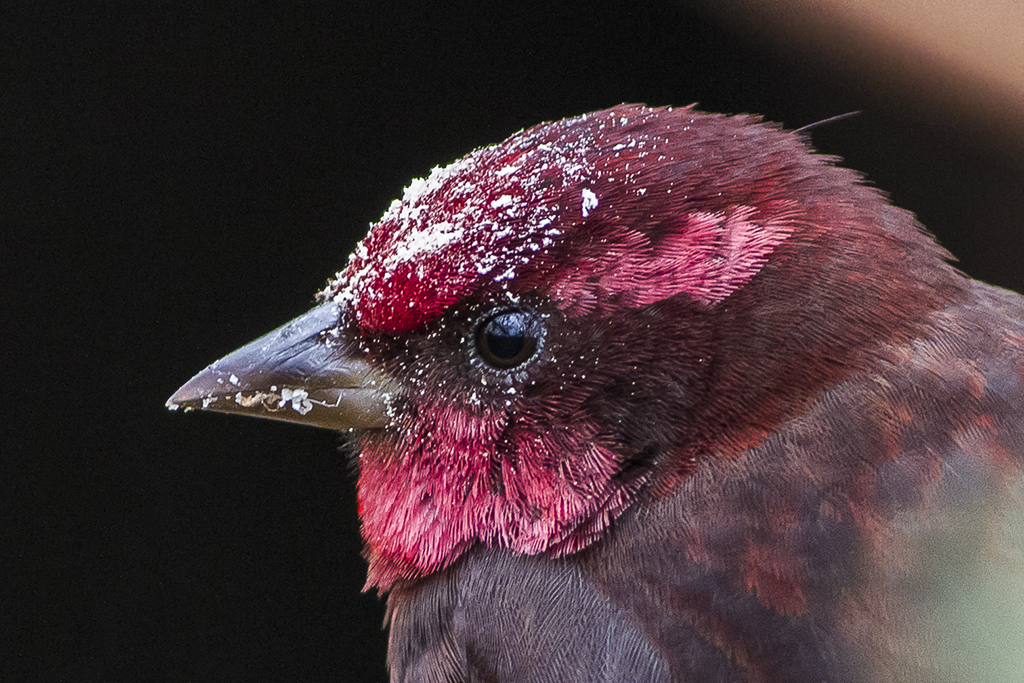
- Male at 9,800 ft in East Sikkim of the state of Sikkim, India
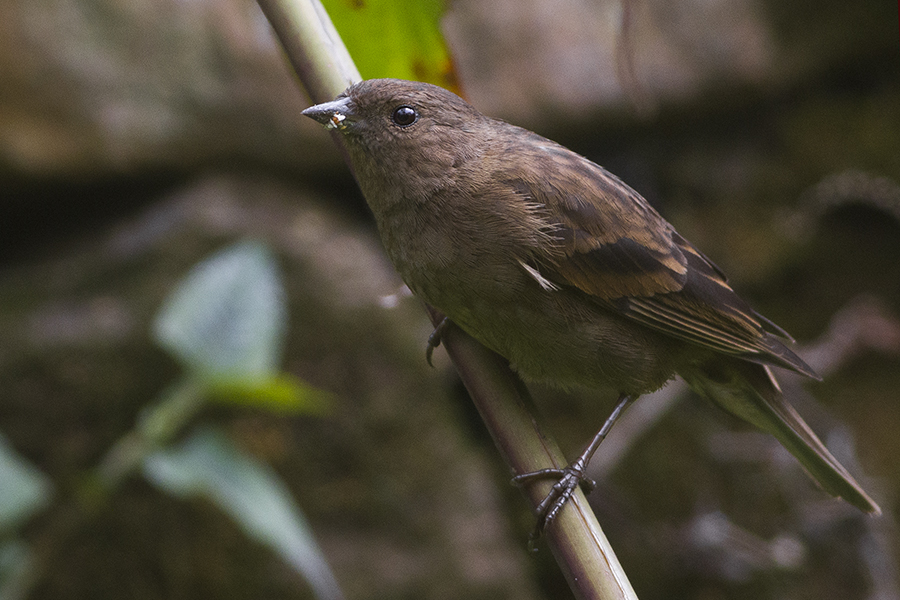
- Female at 6,500 ft in Khangchendzonga National Park, West Sikkim, India

Conservation status
- Least Concern (IUCN 3.1)

Scientific classification
- Kingdom: Animalia
- Phylum: Chordata
- Class: Aves
- Order: Passeriformes
- Family: Fringillidae
- Subfamily: Carduelinae
- Genus: Procarduelis; Blyth, 1843
- Species: P. nipalensis

Binomial name
- Procarduelis nipalensis (Hodgson, 1836)

= Dark-breasted rosefinch =

Species of bird

The dark-breasted rosefinch (Procarduelis nipalensis) is a species of true finch in the monotypic genus Procarduelis. It is found in Bhutan, China, India, Laos, Myanmar, Nepal, Pakistan, Thailand, and Vietnam. Its natural habitats are boreal forests and subtropical or tropical high-altitude shrubland.

== Taxonomy ==
The dark-breasted rosefinch was formerly placed in the genus Carpodacus but was moved Procarduelis based on the results from the phylogenetic analyses of mitochondrial and nuclear DNA sequences.

=== Subspecies ===
Subspecific variation is mostly clinal, with the plumage becoming darker from west to east. There are between two-three recognised subspecies:

- P. n. nipalensis – Hodgson, 1836: The nominate, it is found in the Himalayas, from Kumaon to Nepal, Sikkim, Bhutan, and southeastern Tibet. Populations from southwestern China, south Tibet, and northern Vietnam are sometimes separated as a distinct subspecies, P. n. intensicolor.
- P. n. kangrae – Whistler, 1939: in the western Himalayas, from Kashmir to Garhwal.

== Description ==
The Dark-breasted rosefinch is a medium-sized finch characterized by sexual dimorphism. Males exhibit a vibrant dark pink plumage with a contrasting lighter throat and eyebrow stripe, while females, in contrast, are a subdued dark brown with conspicuous light-colored wingbars. While superficially resembling the Vinaceous Rosefinch, Dark-breasted rosefinch can be distinguished by the male's unique head pattern and the female's lack of streaking on the underparts, coupled with prominent wingbars.

Its vocalizations include a characteristic wheezy sparrow-like "wheer".

== Ecology ==
This finch is a rather shy and reclusive bird that breeds in shrublands above the tree line and mixed forest with elements of rhododendron. In winter it is seen in forest clearings and agricultural areas. It forages on the ground in pairs or small groups, searching for seeds and berries.

== Status ==
The species has a large range and a large population with stable development and is not believed to be under any substantial threat. Based on these criteria, the International Union for Conservation of Nature (IUCN) categorizes the species as "Least Concern". The global population has not been estimated but it is described as common or fairly common.

== Gallery ==
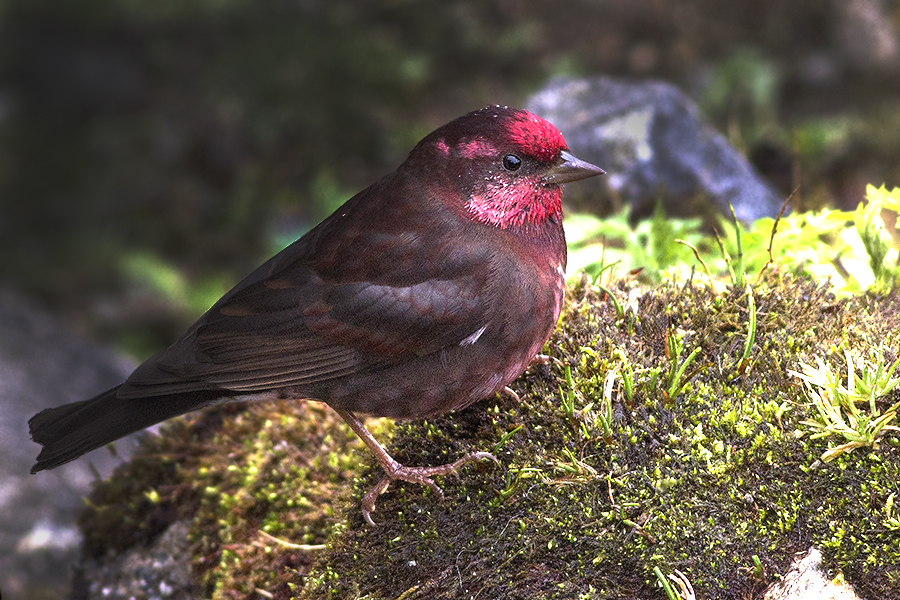
Male at 12,000 ft. from Pangolakha Wildlife Sanctuary, East Sikkim, India

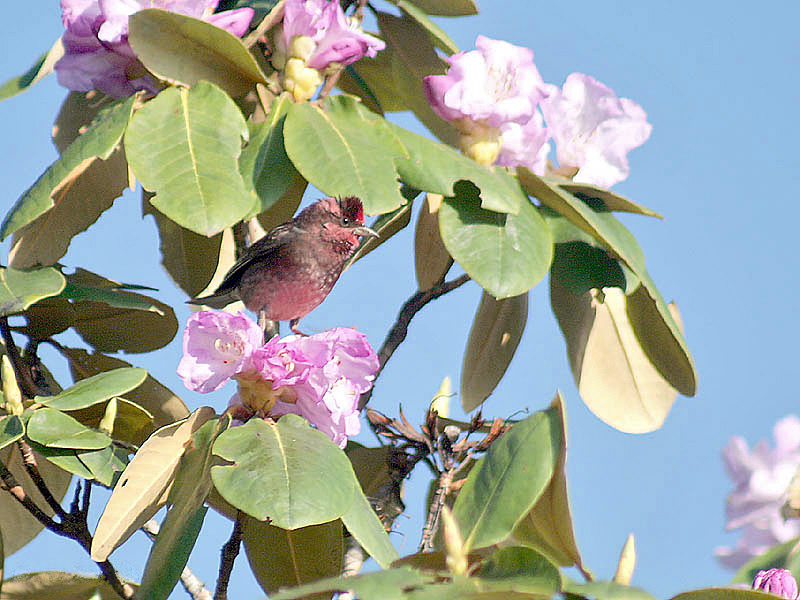
Male at 9,500 ft. in Kullu - Manali District of Himachal Pradesh, India.

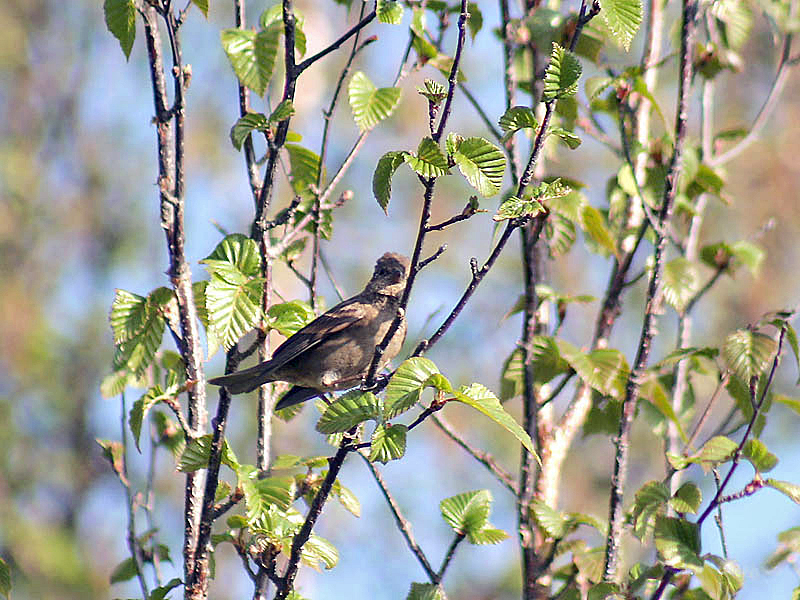
Female at 10,500 ft.in Kullu - Manali District of Himachal Pradesh, India

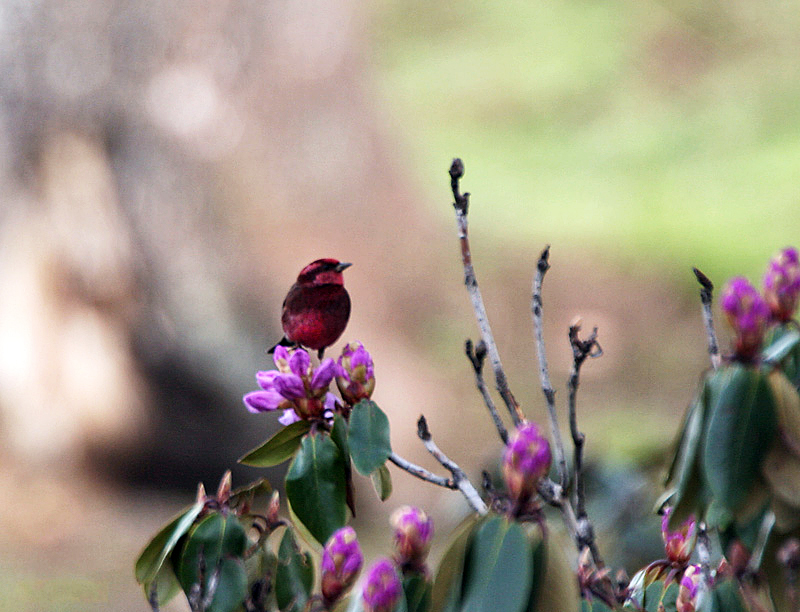
Male at 11,000 ft. in Kullu - Manali District of Himachal Pradesh, India
