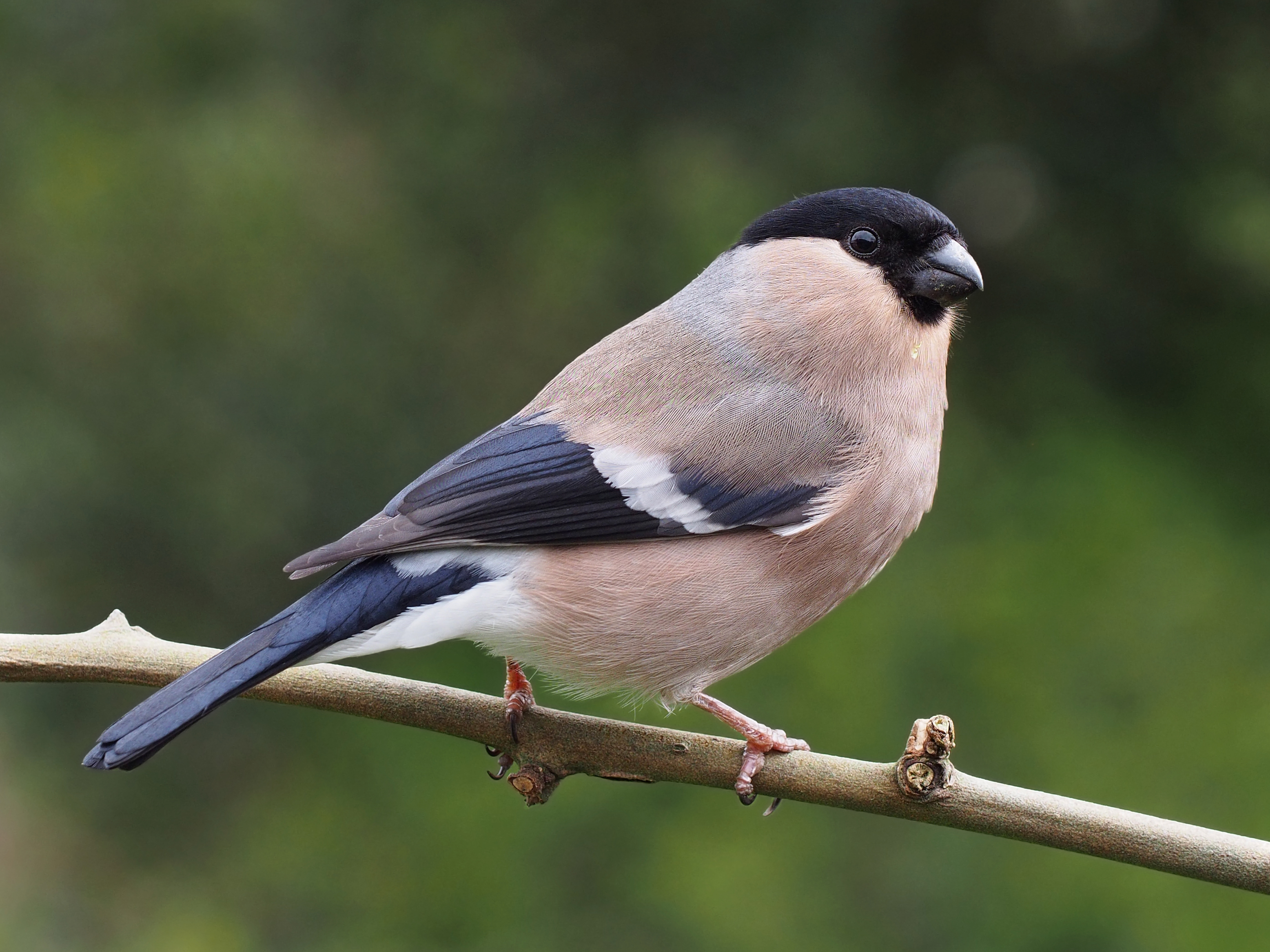

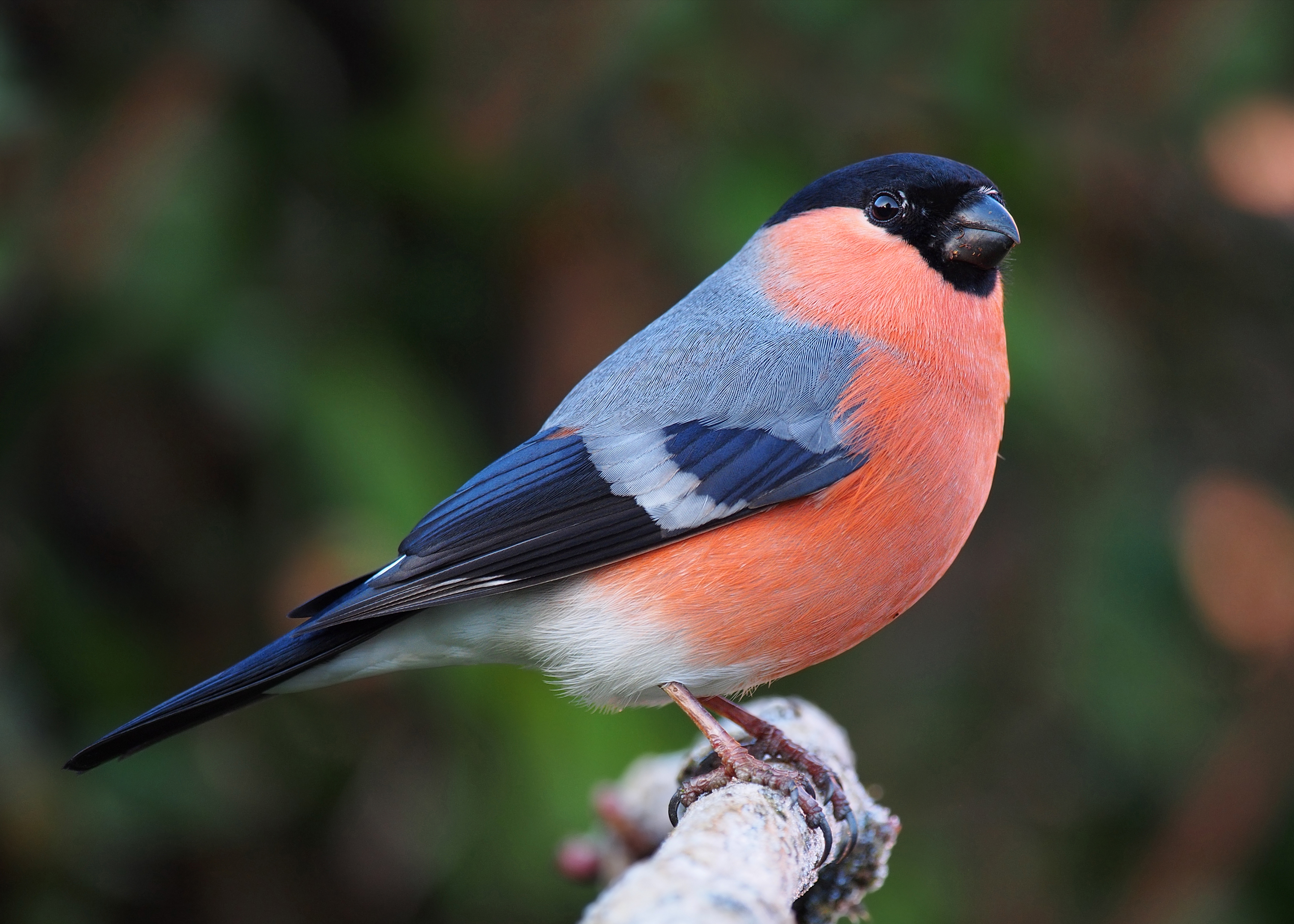
- Eurasian bullfinch (female above, male below)

Scientific classification
- Kingdom: Animalia
- Phylum: Chordata
- Class: Aves
- Order: Passeriformes
- Parvorder: Passerida
- Family: Fringillidae; Leach, 1819

Type genus
- Fringilla Linnaeus, 1758

Subfamilies
- Fringillinae; Carduelinae; Euphoniinae

= Finch =

Family of birds

The true finches are small to medium-sized passerine birds in the family Fringillidae. Finches generally have stout conical bills adapted for eating seeds and nuts and often have colourful plumage. They occupy a great range of habitats where they are usually resident and do not migrate. They have a worldwide native distribution except for Australia and the polar regions. The family Fringillidae contains more than two hundred species divided into fifty genera. It includes the canaries, siskins, redpolls, serins, grosbeaks and euphonias, as well as the morphologically divergent Hawaiian honeycreepers.

Many birds in other families are also commonly called "finches". These groups include the estrildid finches (Estrildidae) of the Old World tropics and Australia; some members of the Old World bunting family (Emberizidae) and the New World sparrow family (Passerellidae); and the Darwin's finches of the Galapagos islands, now considered members of the tanager family (Thraupidae).

Finches and canaries were used in the UK, US and Canada in the coal mining industry to detect carbon monoxide from the eighteenth to twentieth century. This practice ceased in the UK in 1986.

== Systematics and taxonomy ==
The name Fringillidae for the finch family was introduced in 1819 by the English zoologist William Elford Leach in a guide to the contents of the British Museum. The taxonomy of the family, in particular the cardueline finches, has a long and complicated history. The study of the relationship between the taxa has been confounded by the recurrence of similar morphologies due to the convergence of species occupying similar niches. In 1968 the American ornithologist Raymond Andrew Paynter, Jr. wrote:

Limits of the genera and relationships among the species are less understood – and subject to more controversy – in the carduelines than in any other species of passerines, with the possible exception of the estrildines [waxbills].

Beginning around 1990 a series of phylogenetic studies based on mitochondrial and nuclear DNA sequences resulted in substantial revisions in the taxonomy. Several groups of birds that had previously been assigned to other families were found to be related to the finches. The Neotropical Euphonia and the Chlorophonia were formerly placed in the tanager family Thraupidae due to their similar appearance but analysis of mitochondrial DNA sequences revealed that both genera were more closely related to the finches. They are now placed in a separate subfamily Euphoniinae within the Fringillidae. The Hawaiian honeycreepers were at one time placed in their own family, Drepanididae but were found to be closely related to the Carpodacus rosefinches and are now placed within the Carduelinae subfamily. The three largest genera, Carpodacus, Carduelis and Serinus were found to be polyphyletic. Each was split into monophyletic genera. The American rosefinches were moved from Carpodacus to Haemorhous. Carduelis was split by moving the greenfinches to Chloris and a large clade into Spinus leaving just three species in the original genus. Thirty seven species were moved from Serinus to Crithagra leaving eight species in the original genus. Today the family Fringillidae is divided into three subfamilies, the Fringillinae containing a single genus with the chaffinches, the Carduelinae containing 183 species divided into 49 genera, and the Euphoniinae containing the Euphonia and the Chlorophonia.

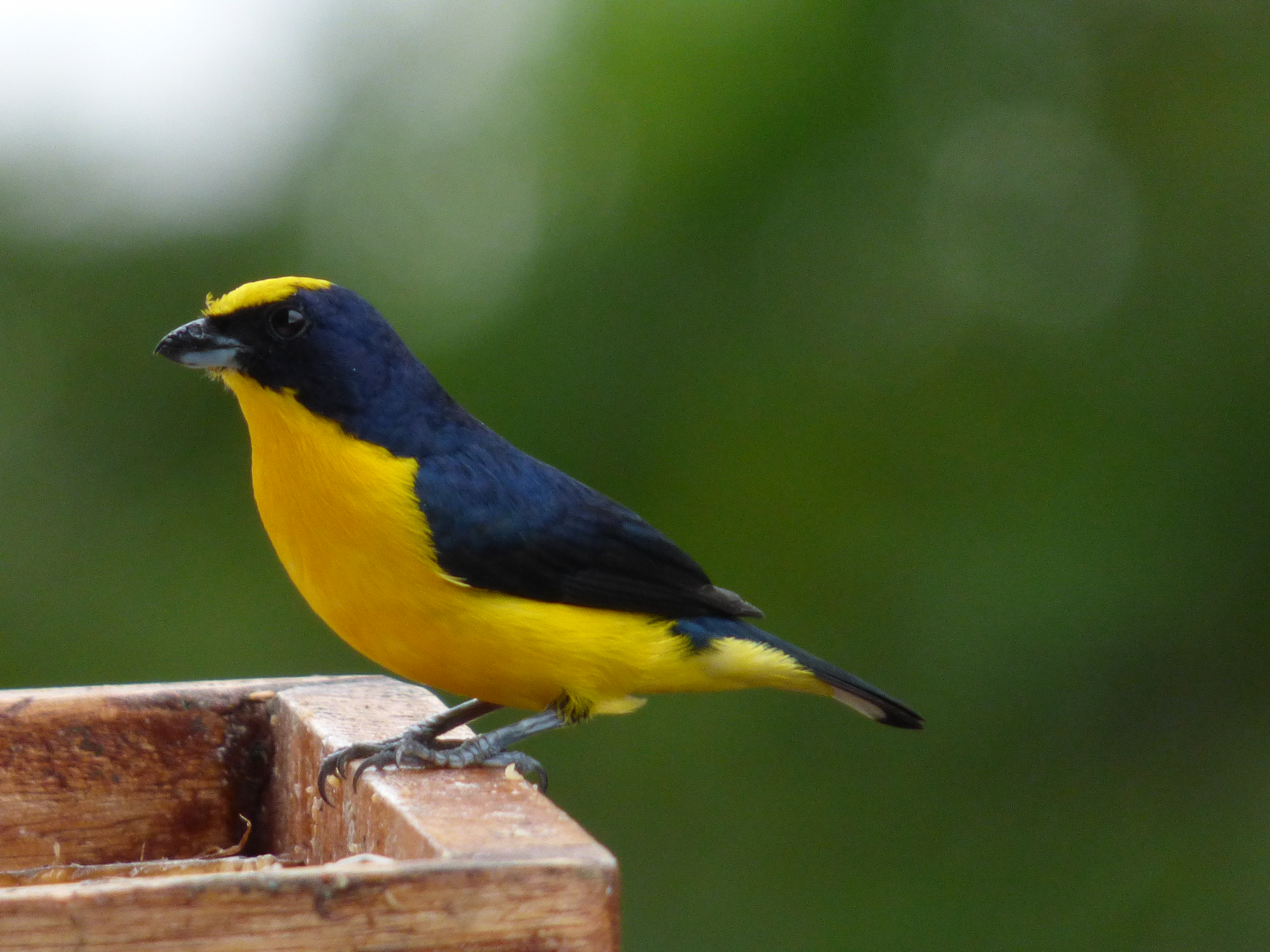
Euphonias, like this thick-billed euphonia, were once treated as tanagers instead of finches.

Although Przewalski's "rosefinch" (Urocynchramus pylzowi) has ten primary flight feathers rather than the nine primaries of other finches, it was sometimes classified in the Carduelinae. It is now assigned to a distinct family, Urocynchramidae, monotypic as to genus and species, and with no particularly close relatives among the Passeroidea.

Finch phylogeny

- - Fringillinae
    Fringilla chaffinches
  - - Euphoniinae
      - Chlorophonia, chlorophonias and some euphonias
      - Euphonia true euphonias
    - Carduelinae
      - - Mycerobas Asian grosbeaks
        - - Hesperiphona American grosbeaks
          - - Coccothraustes hawfinch
            - Eophona Oriental grosbeaks
      - - - Carpodacus Eurasian rosefinches
          - Hawaiian honeycreepers
            - †Melamprosops the extinct poʻouli
            - - - ?
                  Oreomystis ʻakikiki
                - Paroreomyza ʻalauahios and the extinct kākāwahie
              - - - ?
                    - †Dysmorodrepanis the extinct Lanai hookbill
                    - Psittirostra the possibly extinct ʻōʻū
                  - - ?
                      †Chloridops the extinct Hawaiian grosbeaks
                    - Loxioides palila
                    - ?
                      †Rhodacanthis the extinct koa-finches
                    - Telespiza Laysan & Nihoa finches
                - - - †Ciridops the extinct ʻula-ʻai-hāwane
                    - - Drepanis ʻiʻiwi and the extinct mamos
                      - - Himatione ʻapapane and the extinct Laysan honeycreeper
                        - Palmeria ʻākohekohe
                  - - - Pseudonestor Maui parrotbill or kiwikiu
                      - - ?
                          †Akialoa the extinct ʻakialoas
                        - Hemignathus ʻakiapōlāʻau and the possibly extinct nukupuʻus
                    - - Magumma ʻanianiau
                      - ?
                        †Viridonia the extinct greater ʻamakihi (could fall anywhere within this clade)
                      - - Chlorodrepanis lesser ʻamakihis
                        - Loxops 'akepas, ʻakekeʻe, and ʻalawī
        - - - - Pinicola pine grosbeak
              - Pyrrhula bullfinches
            - - - Bucanetes trumpeter and Mongolian finch
                - Rhodopechys crimson-winged finches
              - - - Leucosticte mountain finches
                  - Procarduelis dark-breasted rosefinch
                - - Agraphospiza Blanford's rosefinch
                  - - Callacanthis spectacled finch
                    - Pyrrhoplectes golden-naped finch
          - - Haemorhous North American rosefinches
            - - - Chloris greenfinches
                - - Rhodospiza desert finch
                  - Rhynchostruthus golden-winged grosbeaks
              - - - Crithagra African canaries, serins and siskins
                  - Linurgus oriole finch
                - - - Linaria twite and linnets
                    - - Acanthis redpolls
                      - Loxia crossbills
                  - - - Carduelis European goldfinch etc
                      - Chrysocorythus mountain serin
                    - - Serinus European serin, Atlantic canary, etc
                      - Spinus American siskins & goldfinches, Eurasian siskin and Tibetan serin

Cladogram based on the analysis by Zuccon and colleagues published in 2012, Hawaiian honeycreeper phylogeny based on Lerner and colleagues, 2011 and Pratt (2014). Genera or clades with question marks (?) are of controversial or uncertain taxonomic placement. The rosefinches genus Carpodacus is expanded to include the common rosefinch as suggested by Tietze and colleagues and adopted by the International Ornithological Committee.

=== Fossil record ===
Fossil remains of true finches are rare, and those that are known can mostly be assigned to extant genera at least. Like the other Passeroidea families, the true finches seem to be of roughly Middle Miocene origin, around 20 to 10 million years ago (Ma). An unidentifiable finch fossil from the Messinian age, around 12 to 7.3 million years ago (Ma) during the Late Miocene subepoch, has been found at Polgárdi in Hungary.

== Description ==
The smallest "classical" true finches are the Andean siskin (Spinus spinescens) at as little as 9.5 cm (3.8 in) and the lesser goldfinch (Spinus psaltria) at as little as 8 g (0.28 oz). The largest species is probably the collared grosbeak (Mycerobas affinis) at up to 24 cm (9.4 in) and 83 g (2.9 oz), although larger lengths, to 25.5 cm (10.0 in) in the pine grosbeak (Pinicola enucleator), and weights, to 86.1 g (3.04 oz) in the evening grosbeak (Hesperiphona vespertina), have been recorded in species which are slightly smaller on average. They typically have strong, stubby beaks, which in some species can be quite large; however, Hawaiian honeycreepers are famous for the wide range of bill shapes and sizes brought about by adaptive radiation. All true finches have 9 primary remiges and 12 rectrices. The basic plumage colour is brownish, sometimes greenish; many have considerable amounts of black, while white plumage is generally absent except as wing-bars or other signalling marks. Bright yellow and red carotenoid pigments are commonplace in this family, and thus blue structural colours are rather rare, as the yellow pigments turn the blue color into green. Many, but by no means all true finches have strong sexual dichromatism, the females typically lacking the bright carotenoid markings of males.

== Distribution and habitat ==
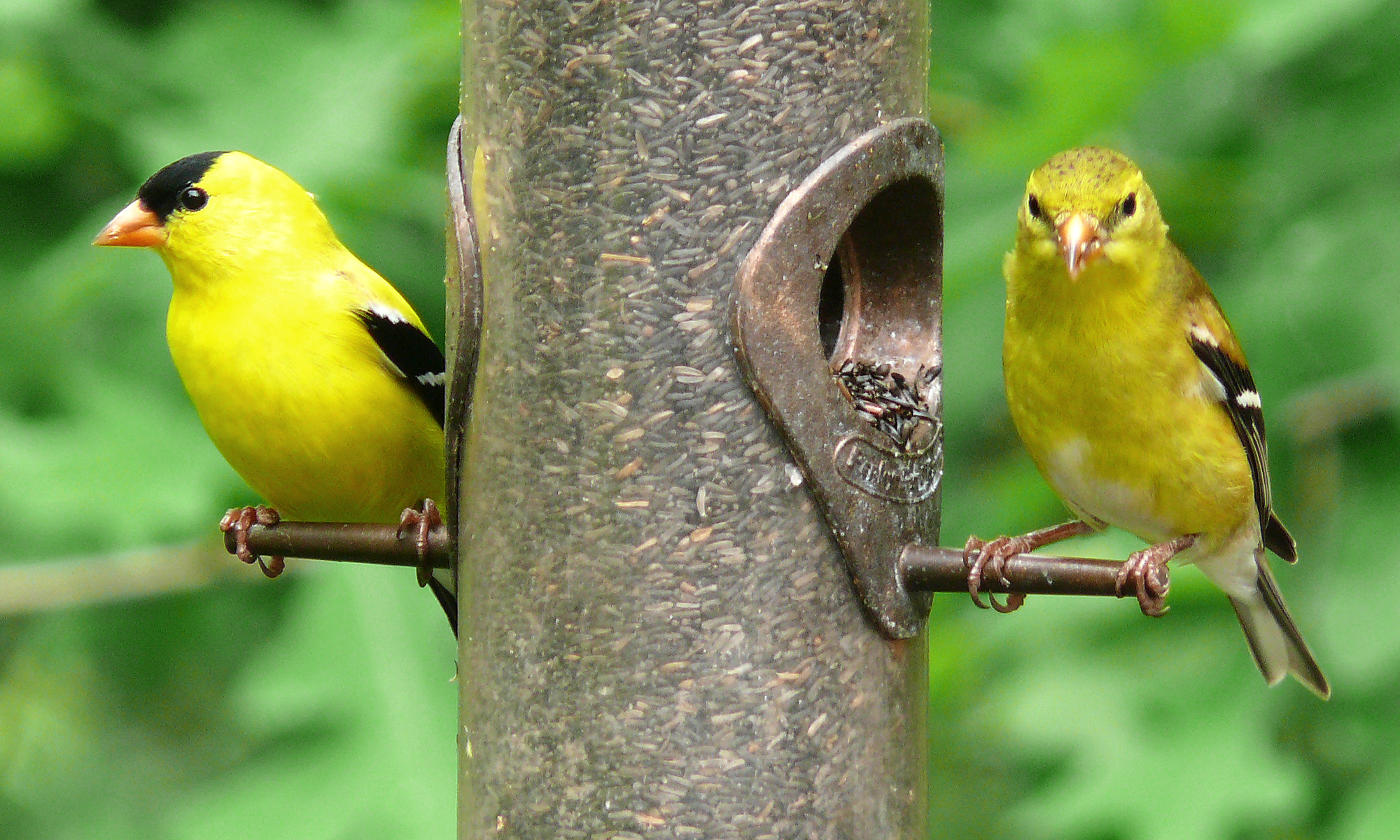
American goldfinch (Spinus tristis) male (left) and female (right) in Johnston County, North Carolina, USA

The finches have a near-global distribution, being found across the Americas, Eurasia and Africa, as well as some island groups such as the Hawaiian islands. They are absent from Australasia, Antarctica, the Southern Pacific and the islands of the Indian Ocean, although some European species have been widely introduced in Australia and New Zealand.

Finches are typically inhabitants of well-wooded areas, but some can be found on mountains or even in deserts.

== Behaviour ==
American goldfinch eating coneflower seeds and taking flight, including slow motion.

The finches are primarily granivorous, but euphoniines include considerable amounts of arthropods and berries in their diet, and Hawaiian honeycreepers evolved to utilize a wide range of food sources, including nectar. The diet of Fringillidae nestlings includes a varying amount of small arthropods. True finches have a bouncing flight like most small passerines, alternating bouts of flapping with gliding on closed wings. Most sing well and several are commonly seen cagebirds; foremost among these is the domesticated canary (Serinus canaria domestica). The nests are basket-shaped and usually built in trees, more rarely in bushes, between rocks or on similar substrate.

== List of genera ==
The family Fringillidae contains 235 species divided into 50 genera and three subfamilies. The subfamily Carduelinae includes 18 extinct Hawaiian honeycreepers and the extinct Bonin grosbeak. See List of Fringillidae species for further details.

Subfamily Fringillinae

- Fringilla – 5 species of chaffinch, 2 species of blue chaffinch, and the brambling

Subfamily Carduelinae

- Mycerobas – 4 Palearctic grosbeaks
- Hesperiphona – 2 species, evening grosbeak and hooded grosbeak
- Coccothraustes – hawfinch
- Eophona – 2 oriental grosbeaks, the Chinese and the Japanese grosbeak
- Pinicola – pine grosbeak
- Pyrrhula – 8 bullfinch species
- Rhodopechys – 2 species, the Asian crimson-winged finch and the African crimson-winged finch
- Bucanetes – trumpeter and the Mongolian finch
- Agraphospiza – Blanford's rosefinch
- Callacanthis – spectacled finch
- Pyrrhoplectes – golden-naped finch
- Procarduelis – dark-breasted rosefinch
- Leucosticte – 6 species of mountain and rosy finches
- Carpodacus – 28 Palearctic rosefinch species
- Hawaiian honeycreeper group (tribe Drepanidini)
  - Melamprosops – contains a single extinct species, the po'ouli
  - Paroreomyza – 3 species, the Oahu alauahio, the Maui alauahio and the extinct kakawahie
  - Oreomystis – akikiki
  - Telespiza – 4 species, the Laysan finch, the Nihoa finch, and 2 prehistoric species
  - Loxioides – 2 species, the palila and a prehistoric species
  - Rhodacanthis – 2 recently extinct species, the lesser and the greater koa finch, and 2 prehistoric species
  - Chloridops – extinct species, the Kona grosbeak
  - Psittirostra – ou
  - Dysmorodrepanis – extinct species, the Lanai hookbill
  - Drepanis – 2 extinct species, the Hawaii mamo and the black mamo, and the extant iiwi
  - Ciridops – single recently extinct species, the Ula-ai-hawane, and 3 prehistoric species
  - Palmeria – contains a single species, the akohekohe
  - Himatione – 2 species, the apapane and the extinct Laysan honeycreeper
  - Viridonia – single extinct species, the greater amakihi
  - Akialoa – 4 recently extinct species, and 2 prehistoric species
  - Hemignathus – 4 species, only one of which is extant
  - Pseudonestor – Maui parrotbill
  - Magumma – anianiau
  - Loxops – 5 species, of which one is extinct
  - Chlorodrepanis – 3 species, the Hawaii, Oahu and Kauai amakihi
- Haemorhous – 3 North America rosefinches
- Chloris – 6 greenfinches
- Rhodospiza – desert finch
- Rhynchostruthus – 3 golden-winged grosbeaks
- Linurgus – oriole finch
- Crithagra – 37 species of canaries, serins and siskins from Africa and the Arabian Peninsula
- Linaria – 4 species including the twite and three linnets
- Acanthis – 3 redpolls
- Loxia – 6 crossbills
- Chrysocorythus – 2 species
- Carduelis – 3 species including the European goldfinch
- Serinus – 8 species including the European serin
- Spinus – 20 species including the North American goldfinches and the Eurasian siskin

Subfamily Euphoniinae

- Euphonia – 27 species all with euphonia in their English name
- Chlorophonia – 5 species all with chlorophonia in their English name

== Gallery ==
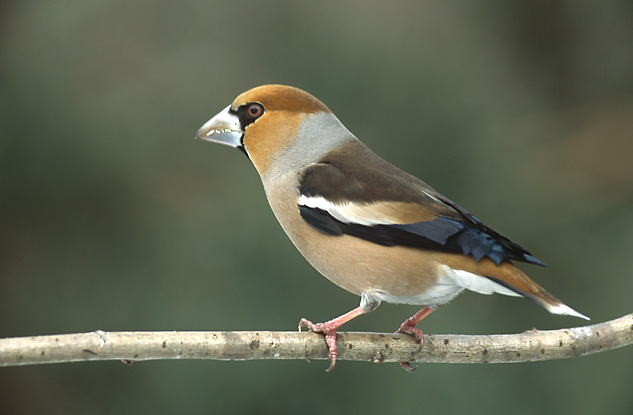
Hawfinch (Coccothraustes coccothraustes), one of the Holarctic grosbeaks

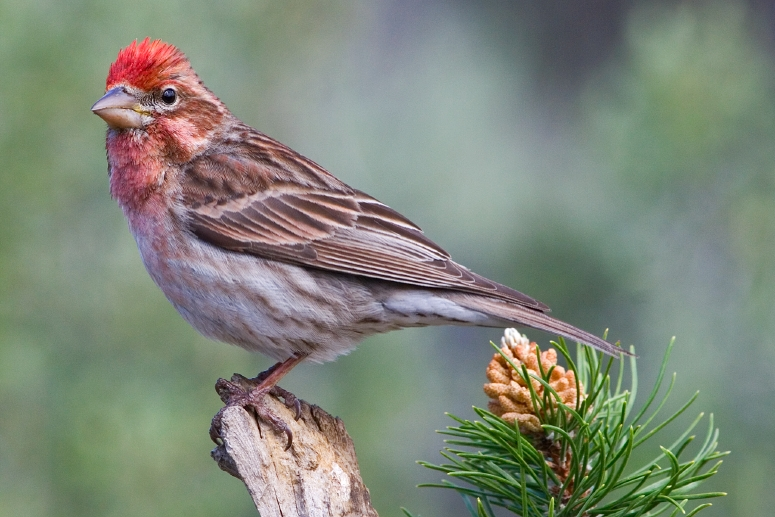
Cassin's finch (Haemorhous cassinii), an American rosefinch

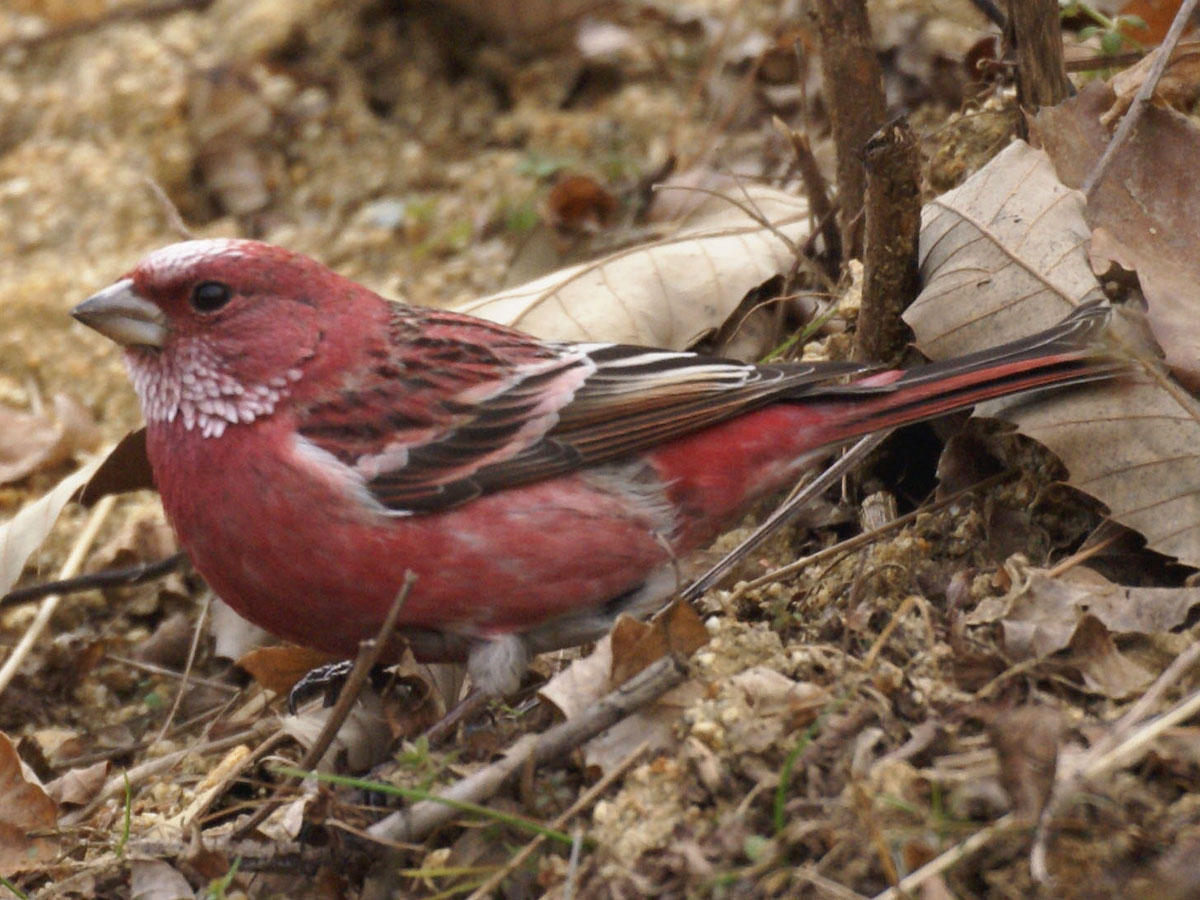
Pallas' rosefinch (Carpodacus roseus), a true rosefinch

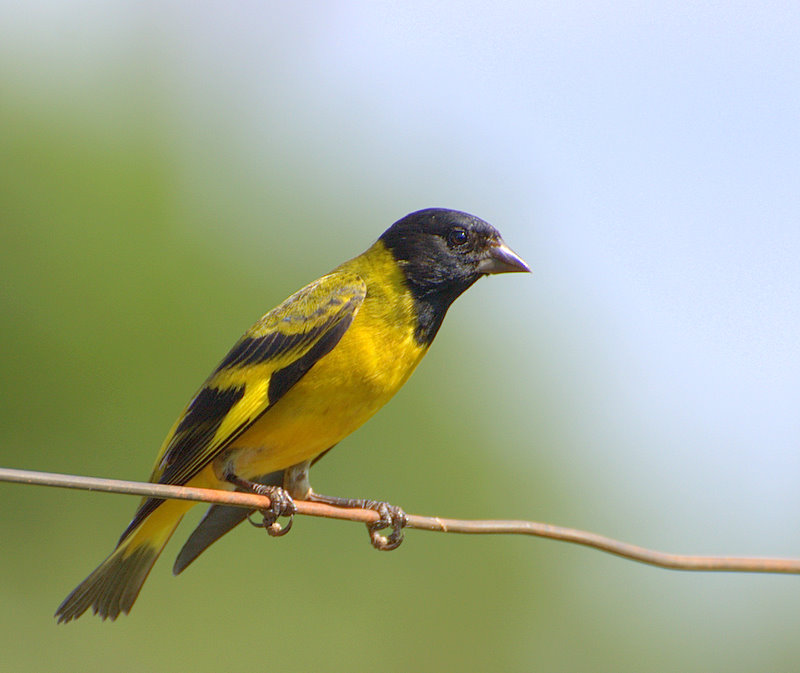
Hooded siskin (Spinus magellanicus)

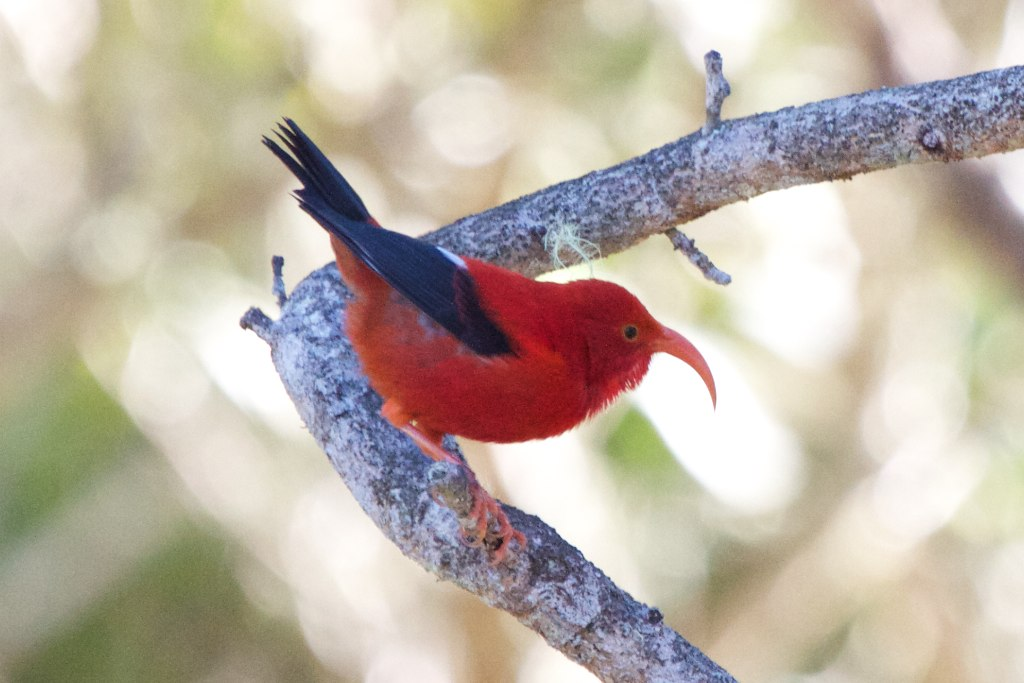
ʻIʻiwi (Drepanis coccinea), a Hawaiian honeycreeper

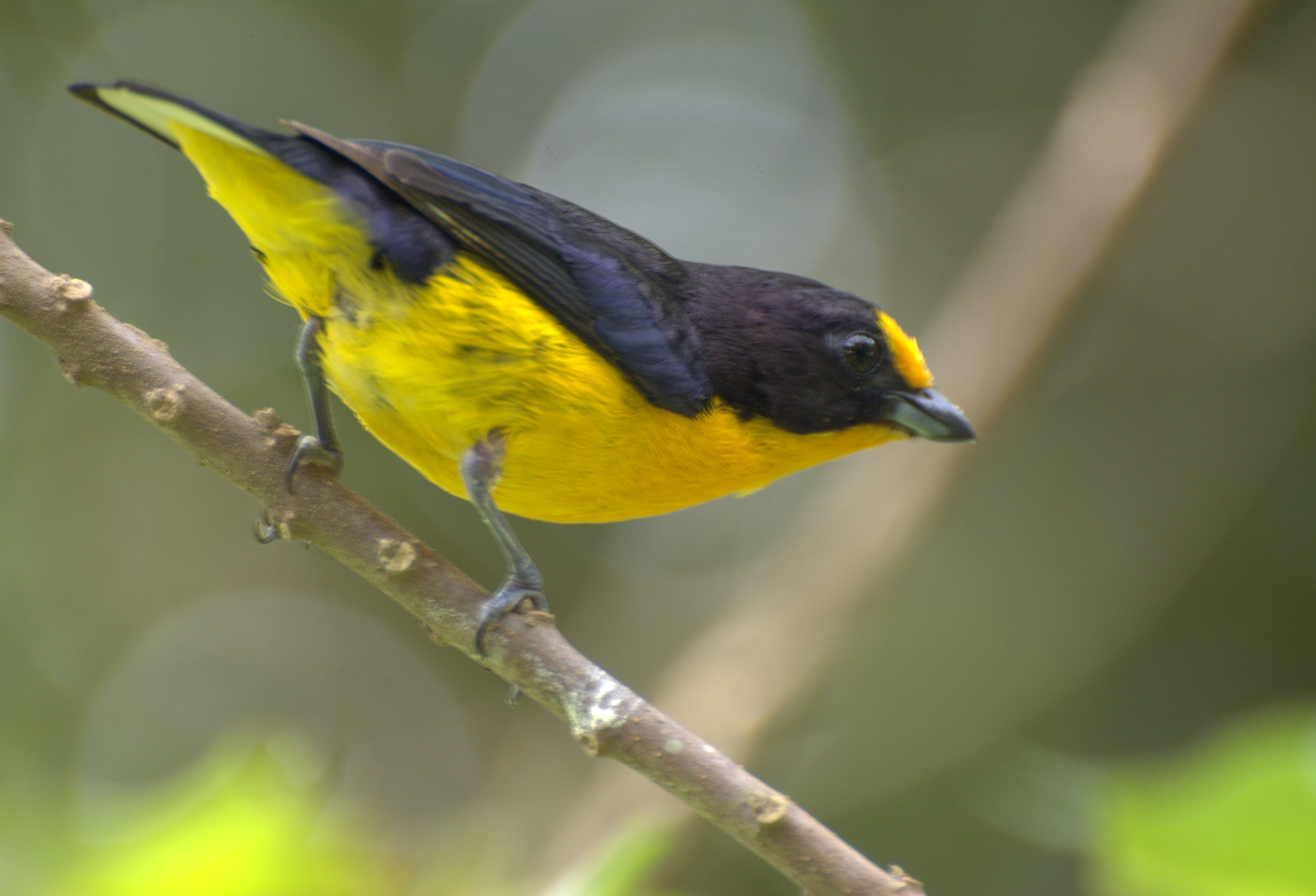
Male violaceous euphonia (Euphonia violacea)

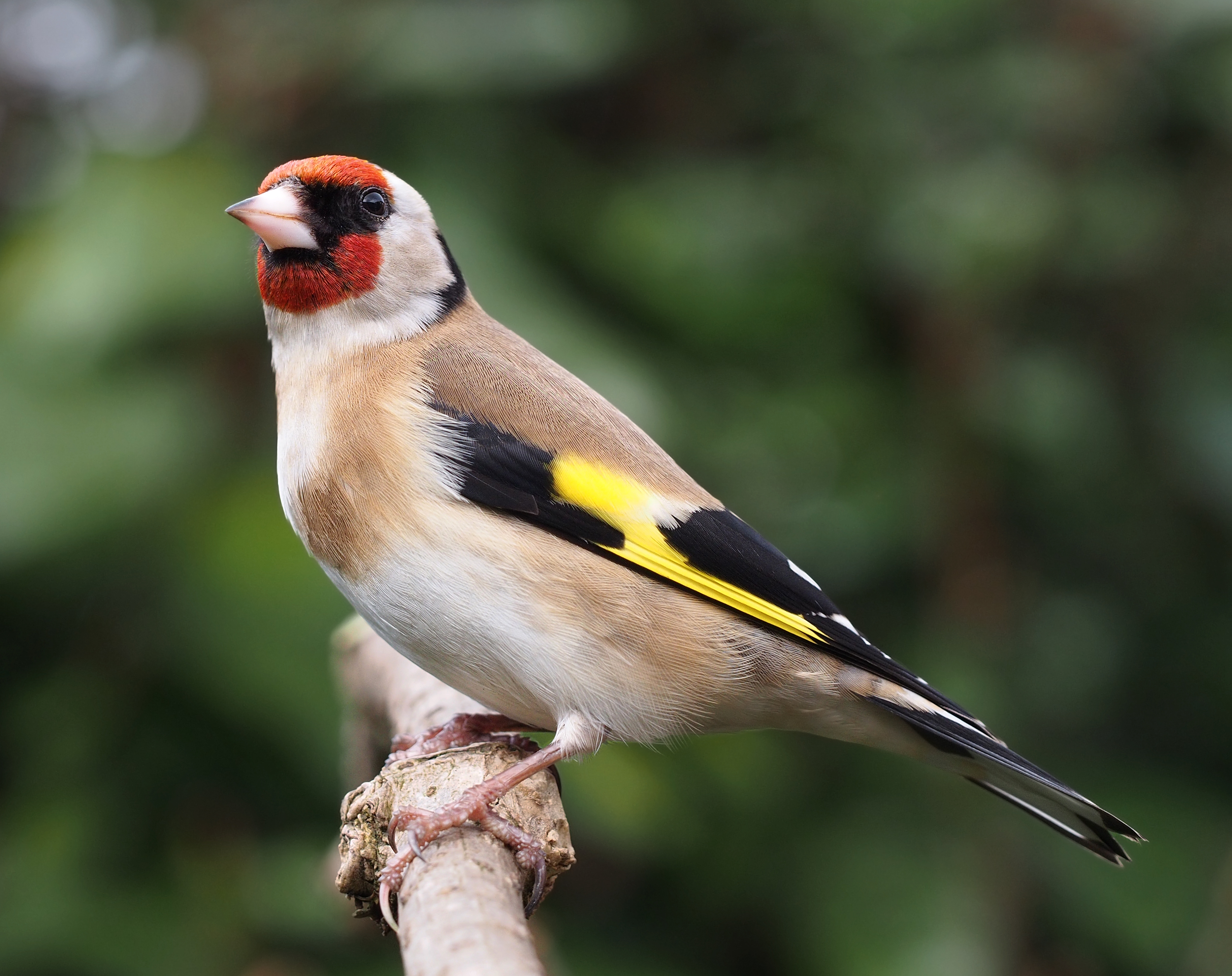
European goldfinch (Carduelis carduelis)

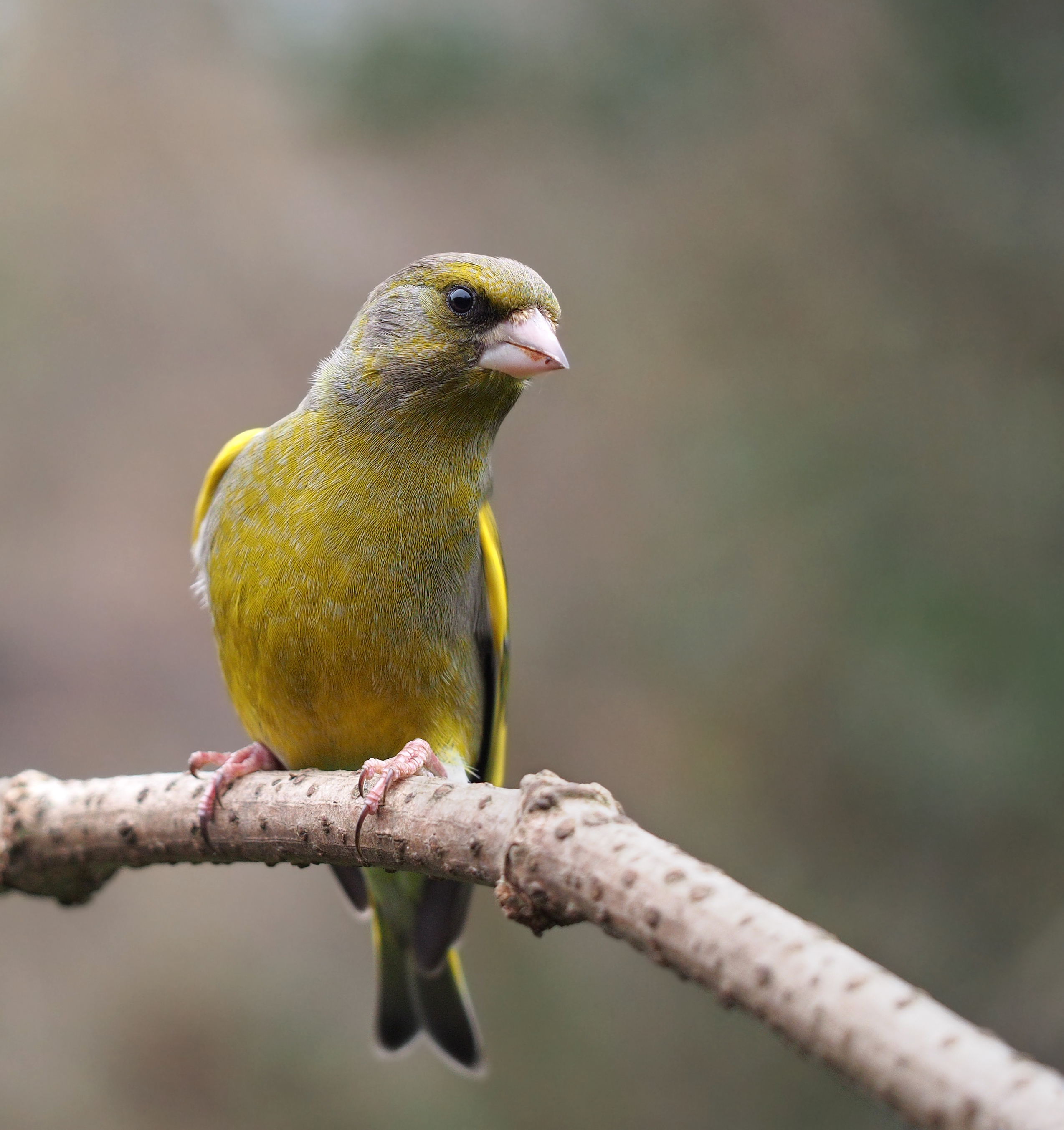
European greenfinch (Chloris chloris)

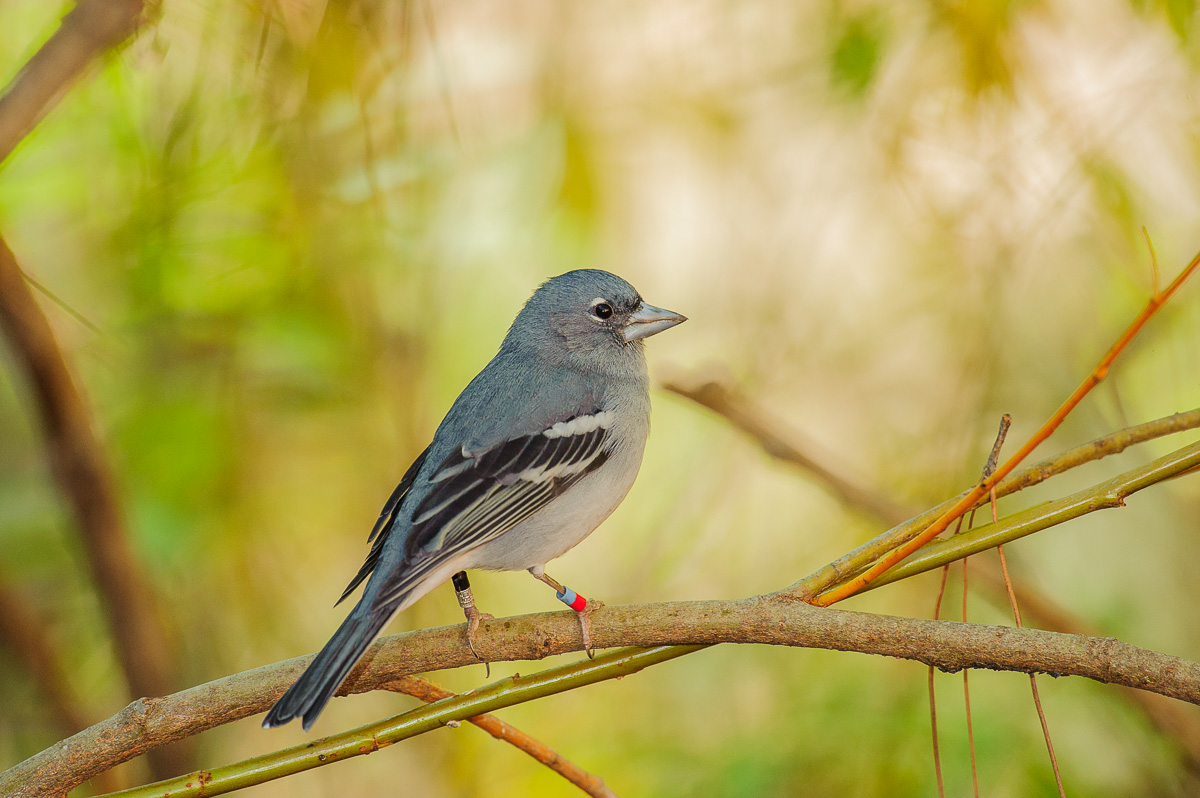
Gran Canaria blue chaffinch (Fringilla polatzeki)

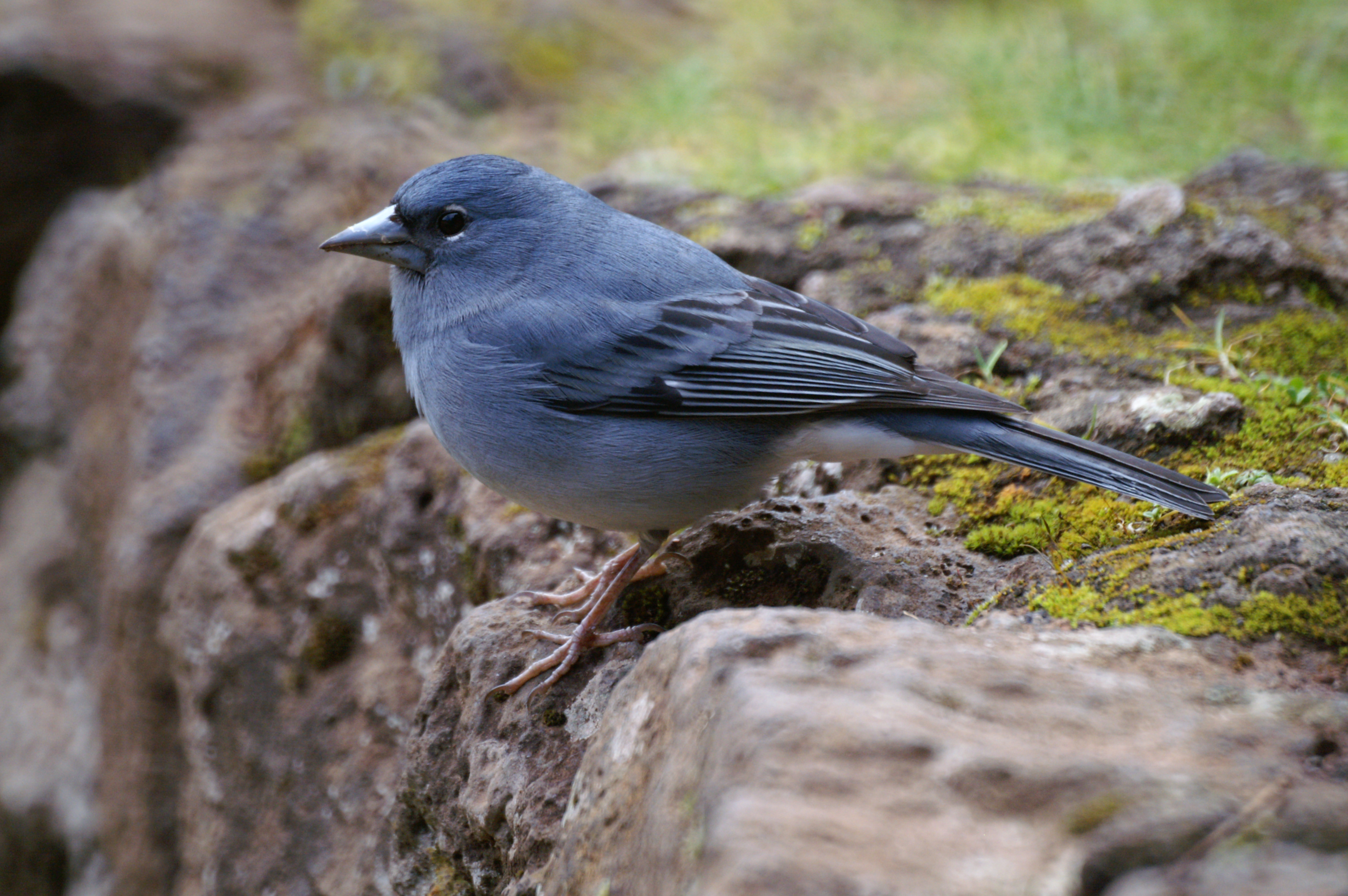
Tenerife blue chaffinch (Fringilla teydea)

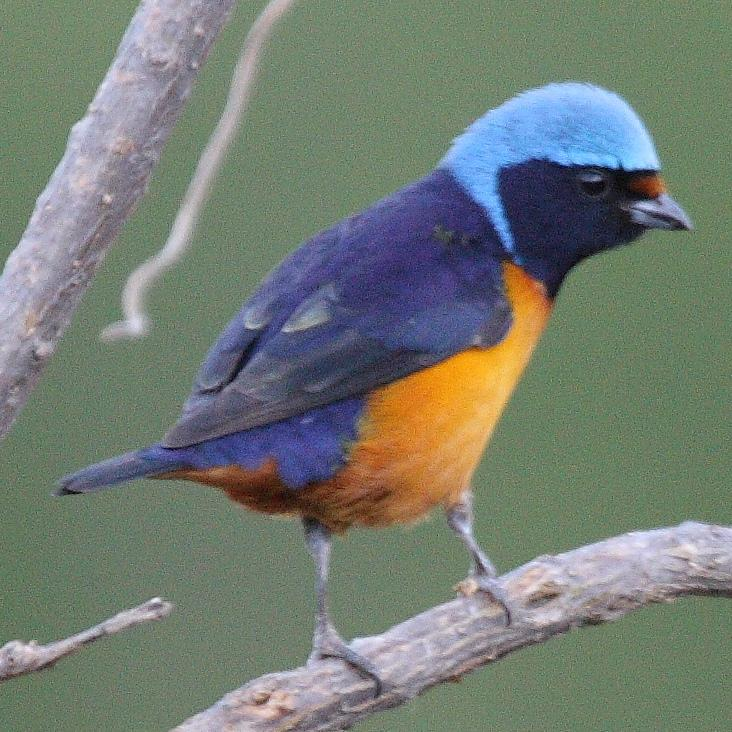
Elegant euphonia (Chlorophonia elegantissima)

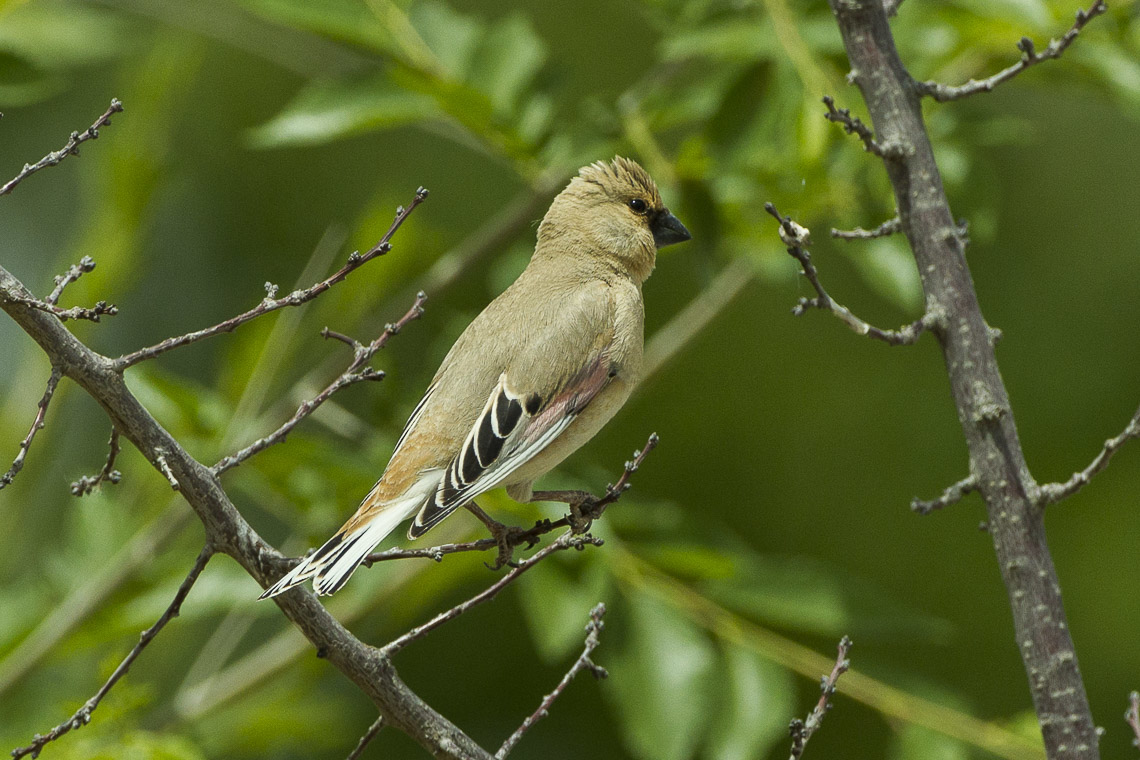
Desert finch (Rhodospiza obsoleta)

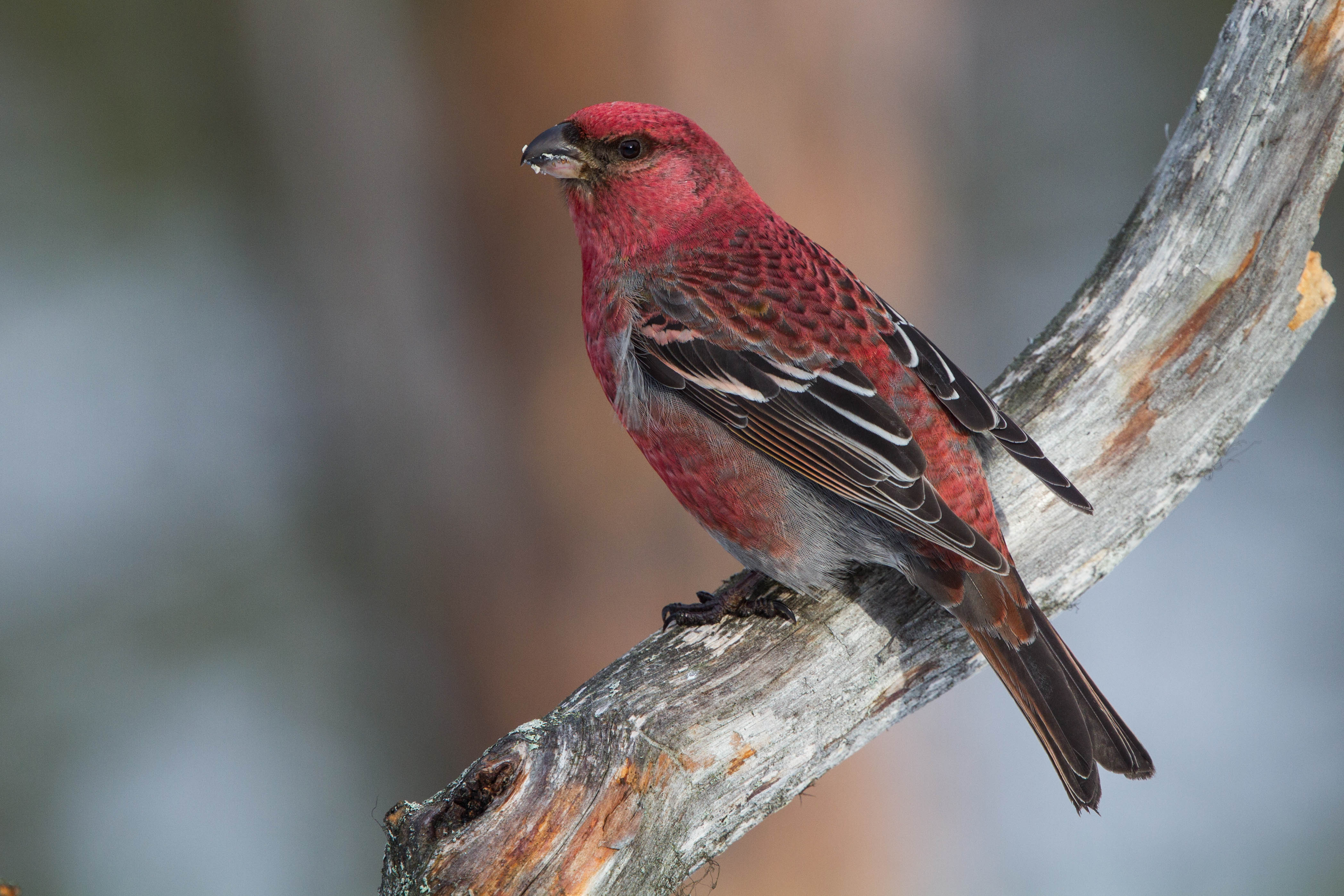
Pine grosbeak (Pinicola enucleator)

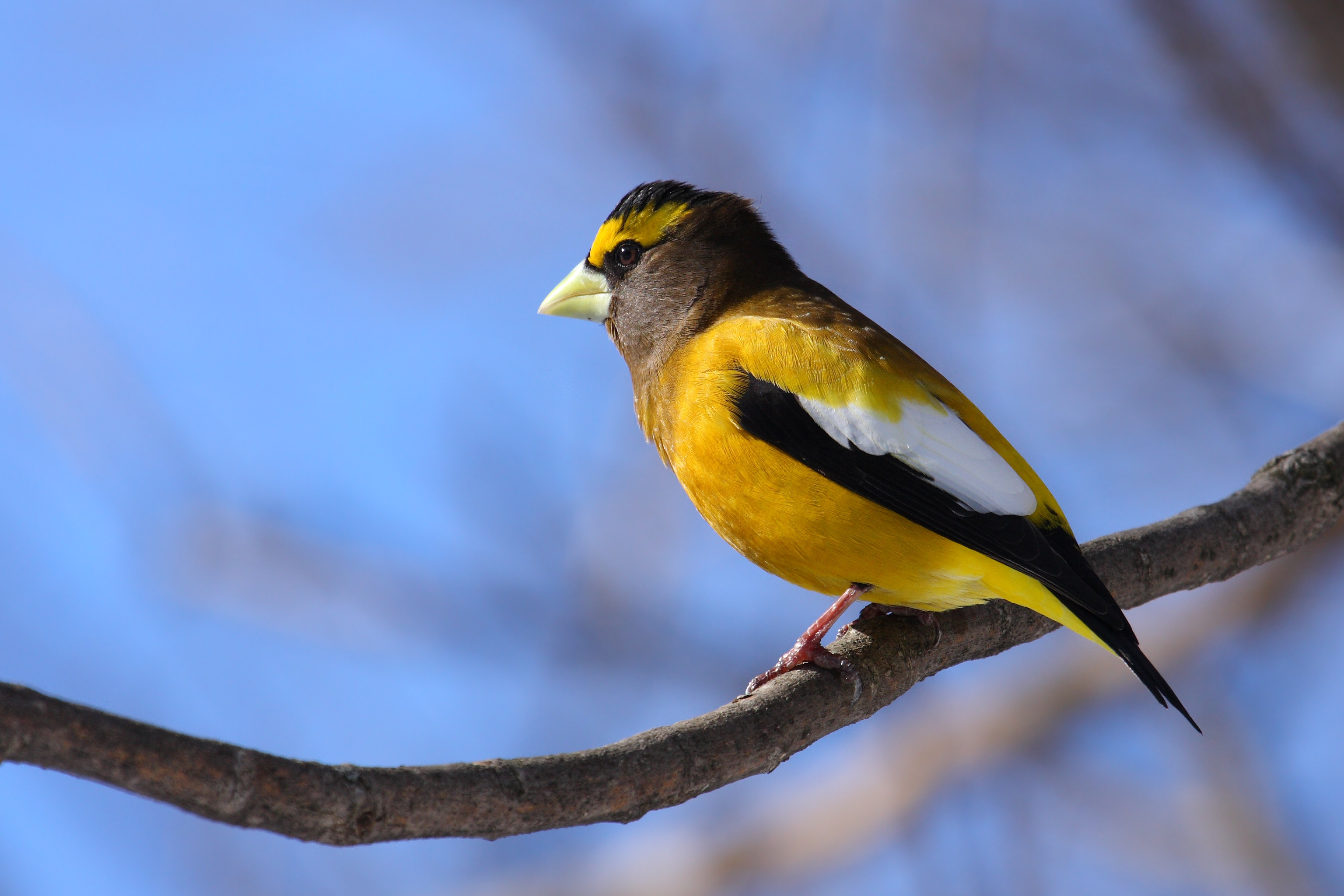
Evening grosbeak (Hesperiphona vespertina)

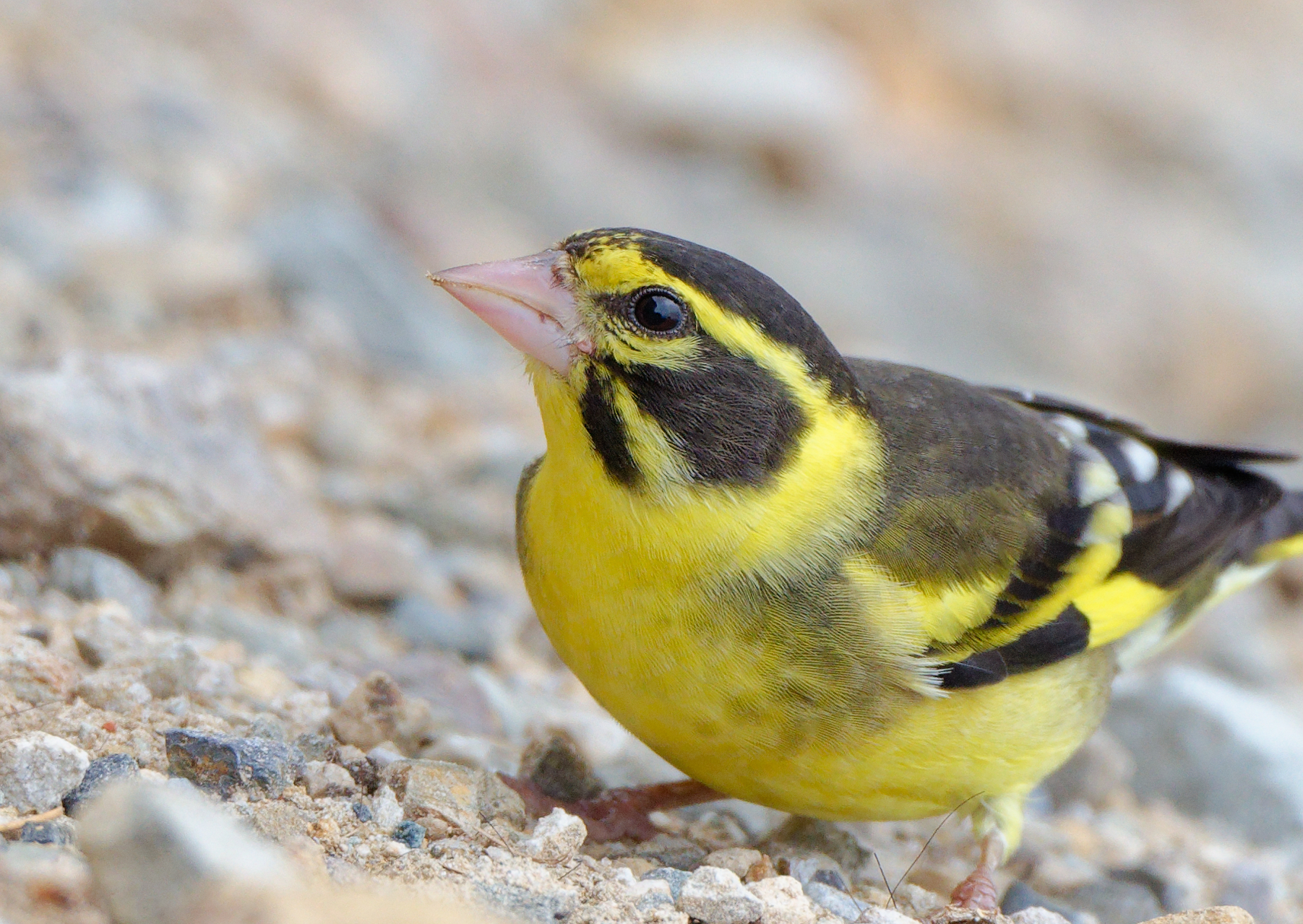
Yellow-breasted greenfinch (Chloris spinoides)

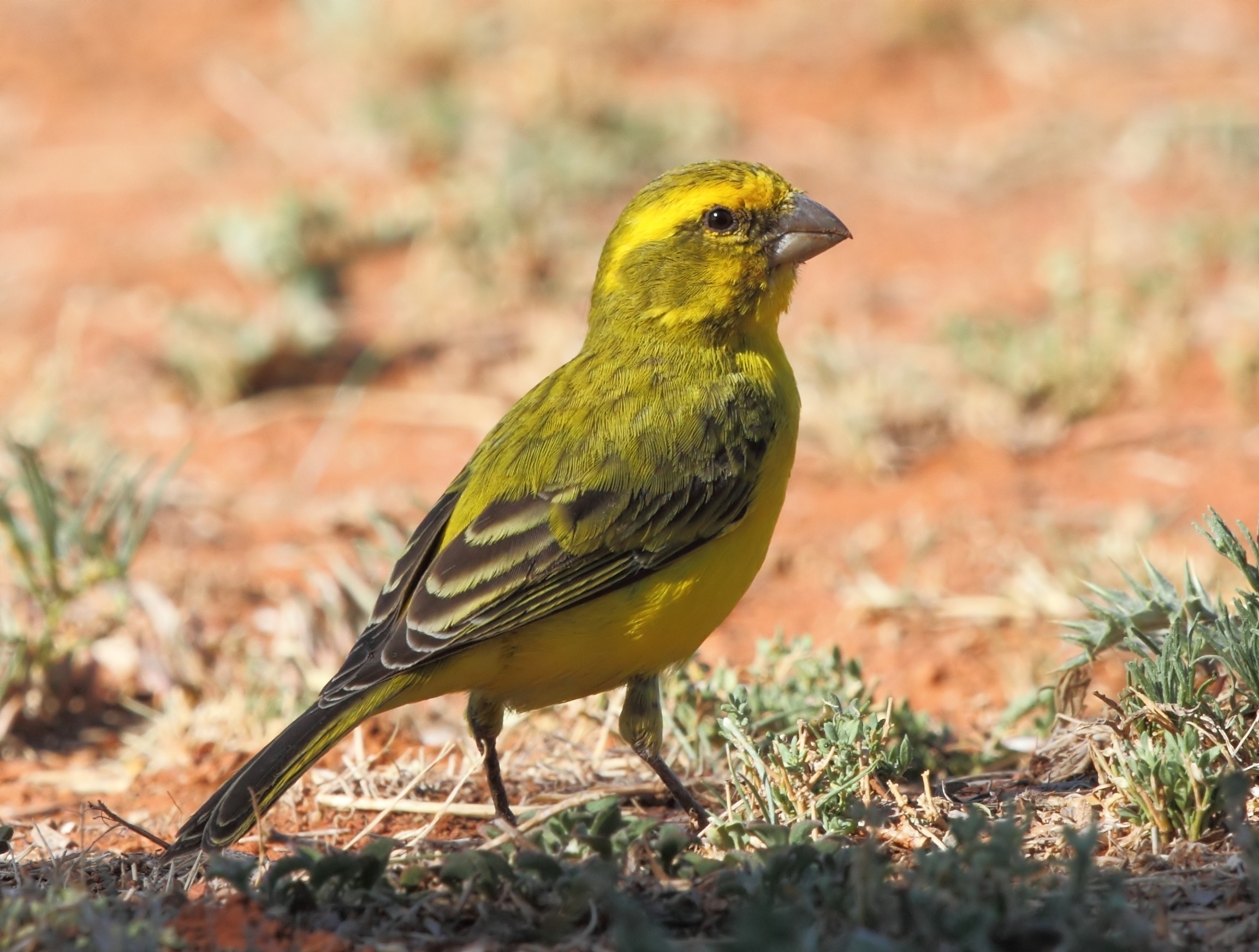
Yellow canary (Crithagra flaviventris)

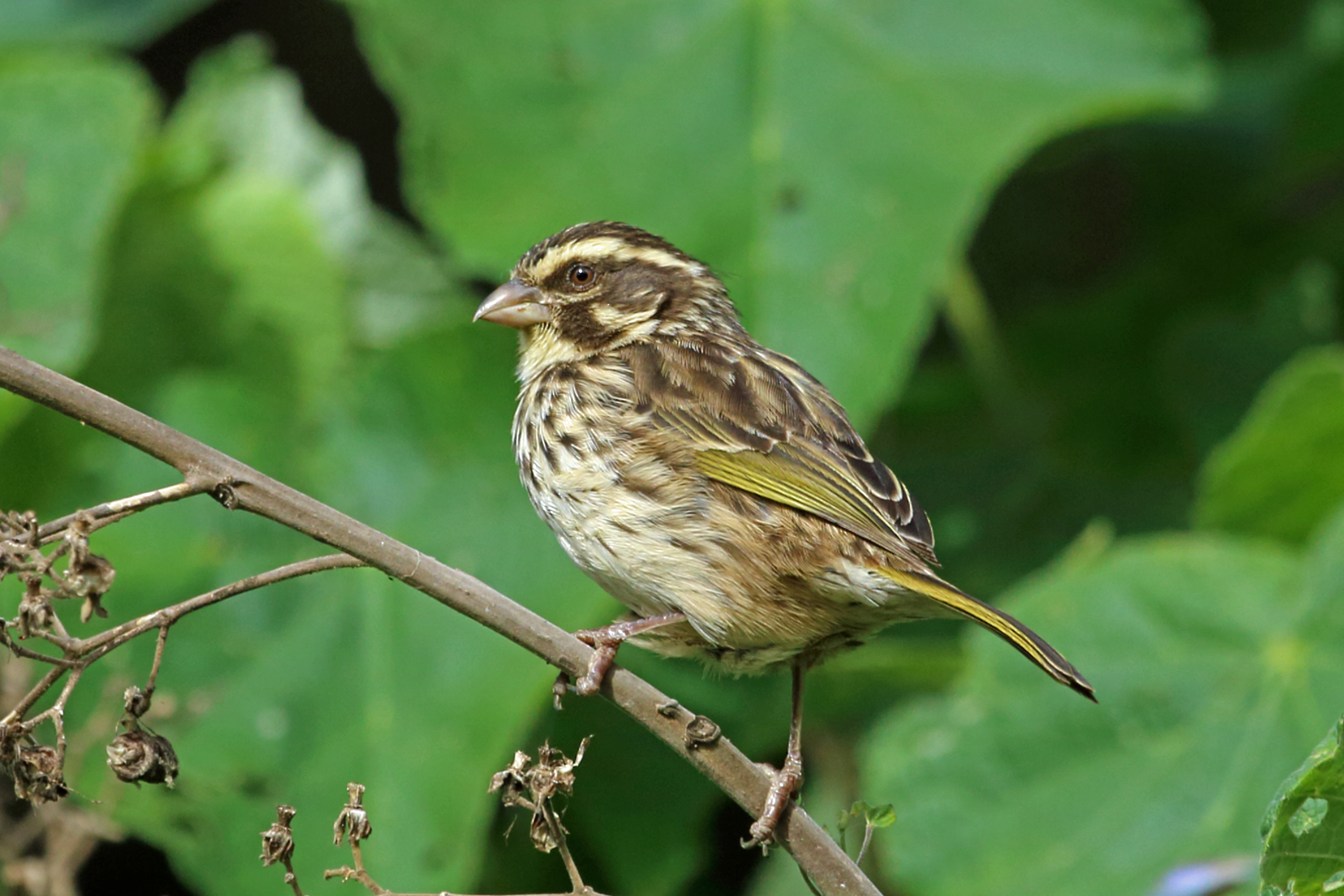
Streaky seedeater (Crithagra striolata)

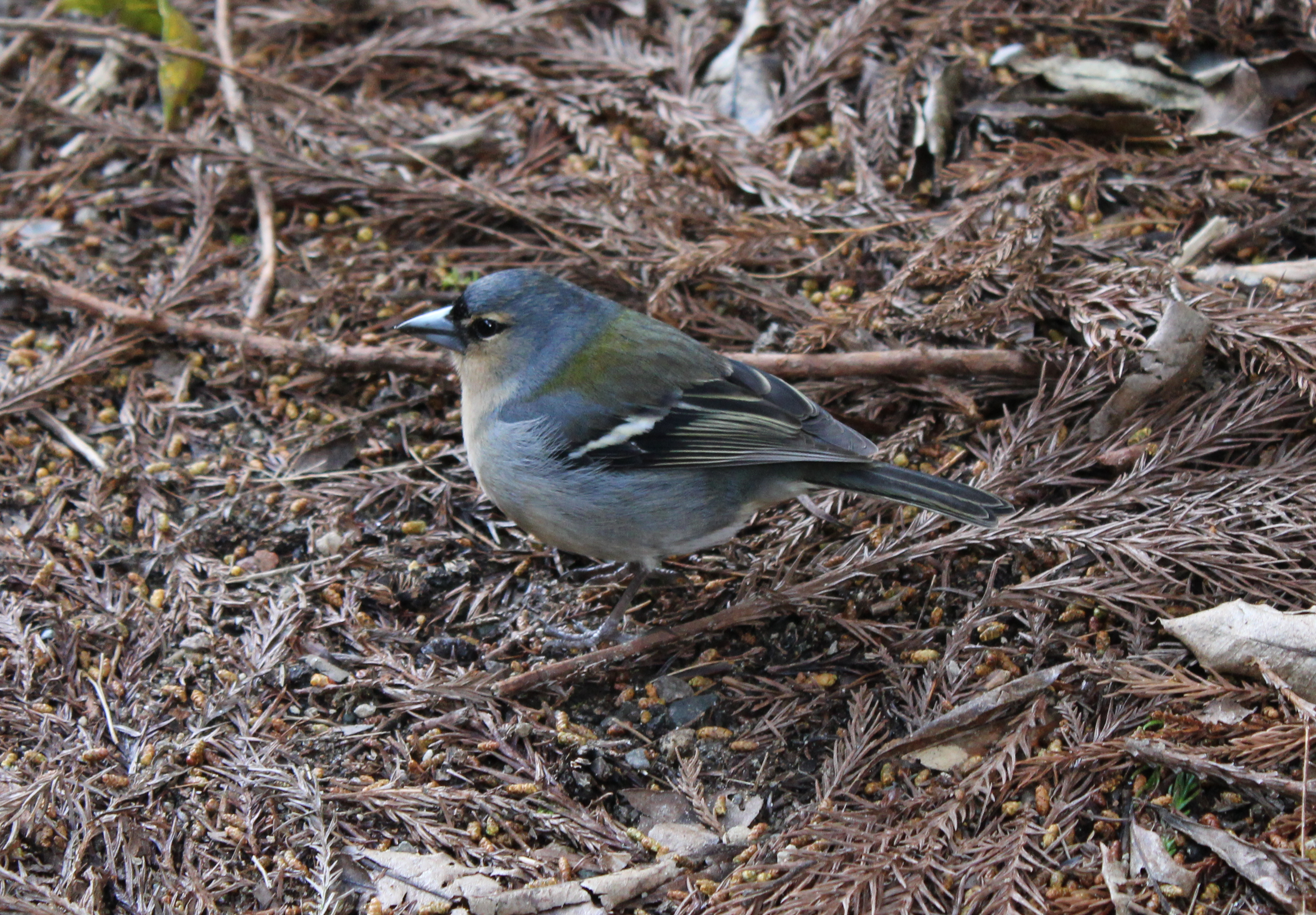
Azores chaffinch (Fringilla coelebs moreletti)

== See also ==
- The Finch Society of Australia

== Sources ==
- Clement, Peter; Harris, Alan & Davis, John (1993): Finches and Sparrows: an identification guide. Christopher Helm, London. ISBN 0-7136-8017-2
- Hír, János; Kókay, József; Venczel, Márton; Gál, Erika; Kessler, Eugén (2001). "Elõzetes beszámoló a felsõtárkányi "Güdör-kert" n. õslénytani lelõhelykomplex újravizsgálatáról [A preliminary report on the revised investigation of the paleontological locality-complex "Güdör-kert" at Felsõtárkány, Northern Hungary]". Folia Historico Naturalia Musei Matraensis (in Hungarian). 25: 41–64.
- Jønsson, Knud A.; Fjeldså, Jon (2006). "A phylogenetic supertree of oscine passerine birds (Aves: Passeri)". Zool. Scripta. 35 (2): 149–186. doi:10.1111/j.1463-6409.2006.00221.x. S2CID 85317440.
- Marten, Jill A.; Johnson, Ned K. (1986). "Genetic relationships of North American cardueline finches" (PDF). Condor. 88 (4): 409–420. doi:10.2307/1368266. JSTOR 1368266. Archived (PDF) from the original on 2014-02-22.
- Newton, Ian (1973): Finches (New Naturalist series). Taplinger Publishing. ISBN 0-8008-2720-1
