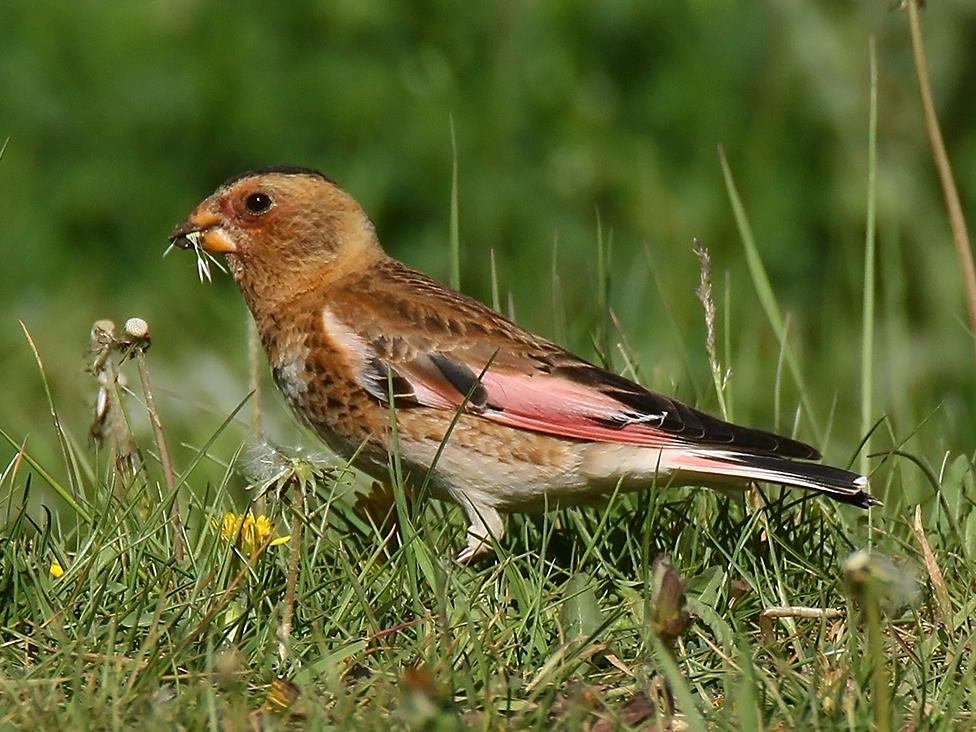
- R. s. sanguineus, Gilgit-Baltistan, Pakistan
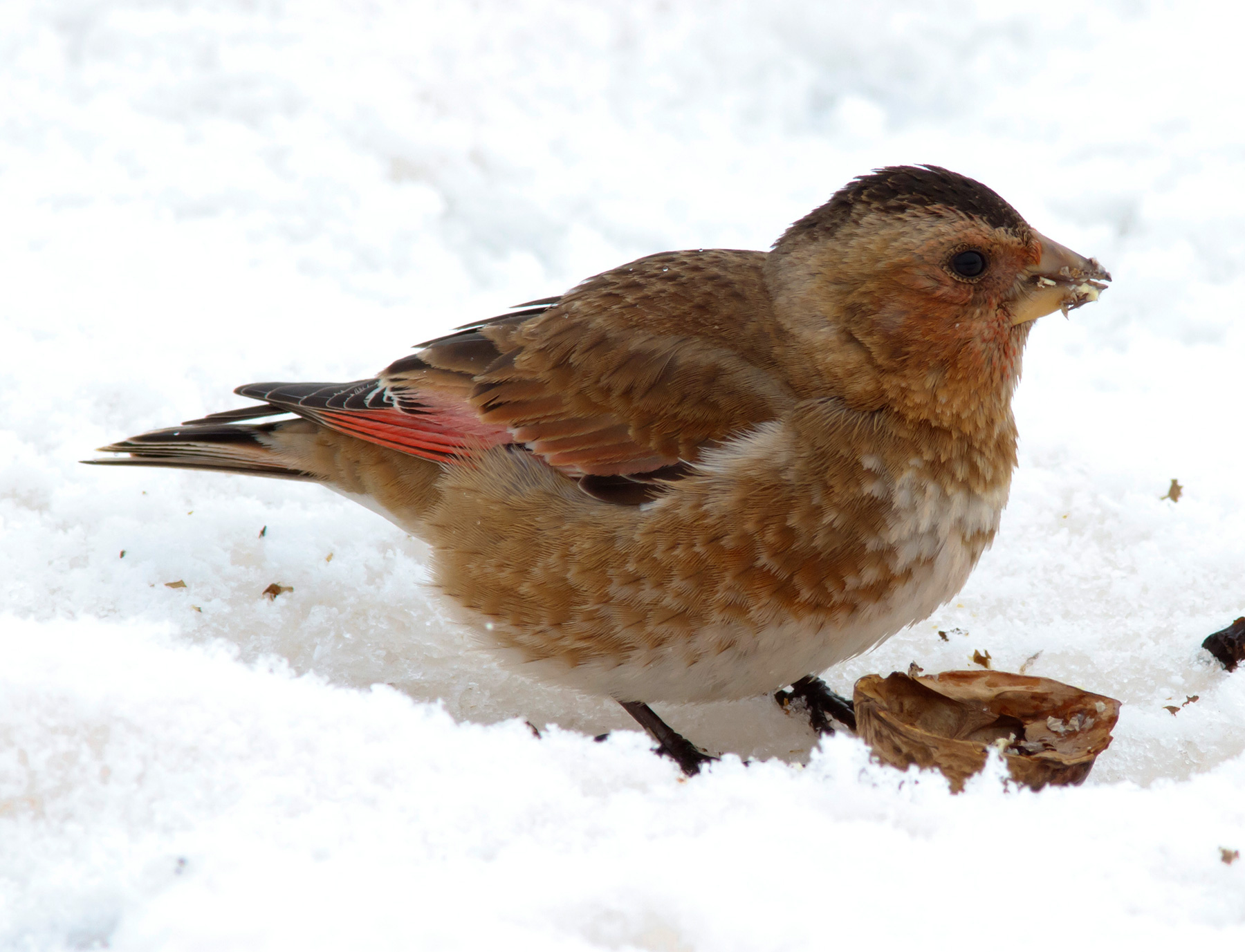
- R. s. alienus, Oukaimeden, Morocco

Conservation status
- Least Concern (IUCN 3.1)

Scientific classification
- Kingdom: Animalia
- Phylum: Chordata
- Class: Aves
- Order: Passeriformes
- Family: Fringillidae
- Subfamily: Carduelinae
- Genus: Rhodopechys
- Species: R. sanguineus

Binomial name
- Rhodopechys sanguineus (Gould, 1838)

= Crimson-winged finch =

Species of bird

The crimson-winged finch (Rhodopechys sanguineus) is a pale-coloured thick-set finch with a heavy, dull yellowish bill. It is the only species placed in the genus Rhodopechys. It is found at high altitudes in the mountains of northwest Africa, and from Turkey to northeast Pakistan. It has sometimes been split into two species, the African crimson-winged finch and the Asian crimson-winged finch.

== Taxonomy ==
The crimson-winged finch was formally described in 1838 by the English ornithologist John Gould based on a specimen collected at Erzurum in eastern Turkey. He placed the species with the finches in the genus Fringilla and coined the binomial name Fringilla sanguinea. The specific epithet is Latin meaning "bloody", from sanguis, sanguinis meaning "blood". The crimson-winged finch is now the only species placed in the genus Rhodopechys that was introduced in 1851 by the German ornithologist Jean Cabanis with the crimson-winged finch as the type species. The genus name is from Ancient Greek ῥοδοπηχυς/rhodopēkhus, ῥοδοπηχυος/rhodopēkhuos meaning "rosy-armed", from ῥοδον/rhodon meaning "rose" and πηχυς/pēkhus, πηχεως/pēkheōs meaning "forearm".

Two subspecies are recognised:

- R. s. sanguineus (Gould, 1838) – Turkey to west China, Tajikistan and Afghanistan
- R. s. alienus Whitaker, 1897 – Morocco, Algeria

The crimson-winged finch has sometimes been split into two species with the subspecies R. s. sanguineus known as the Asian crimson-winged finch and the subspecies R. s. alienus known as the African crimson-winged finch.

=== Differences between African and Asian subspecies ===
There are several differences between Asian and African subspecies:

- African birds have a rosy-tinged grey-white central chin and throat, with a narrow brown breast-band below it, whereas this whole area is solidly tawny-brown on Asian birds.
- The brown breast and flank markings on Asian birds are more extensive than on African birds.
- African birds have less black on the crown than Asian birds (on males it often tends to be restricted to the forecrown).

Male birds show the following additional differences:

- Asian birds have extensive pink in their uppertail-coverts, which is lacking in African birds (although the latter can show a vinous wash here in fresh plumage).
- Asian birds often have black spotting on their breast-sides; African birds always lack this.
- Asian birds can have distinct black markings on their mantle, but these are much less distinct on African birds.
- Asian birds have on average more distinct black markings on their ear-coverts than African birds.
- Asian birds typically have more extensive red in their face, often in the fore-supercilium (African birds can show red here but it is not the norm).

== Ecology ==
This species lives on rocky mountainsides, at altitudes of 2,000–4,200 m in the summer, sometimes descending to 500 m in the winter. It can be found in barren landscapes with little vegetation, and sometimes nests in rock crevices. It feeds on seeds, and during the winter descends in flocks to agricultural fields to find food. The female lays and incubates 4 or 5 blue, lightly speckled eggs.

== Status ==
This species has a vast range and a large population, meeting neither range nor population size criteria for threat. While the population trend is unknown, it is not declining rapidly enough to approach vulnerability. Therefore, it is classified as "Least Concern" on the IUCN Red List.

The population size in Europe is estimated at 107,000-411,000 mature individuals, comprising about 20% of the global range. This suggests a preliminary global population of 535,000-2,060,000 mature individuals, though further assessment is needed.

This species is also a symbol of the country of Lebanon.
