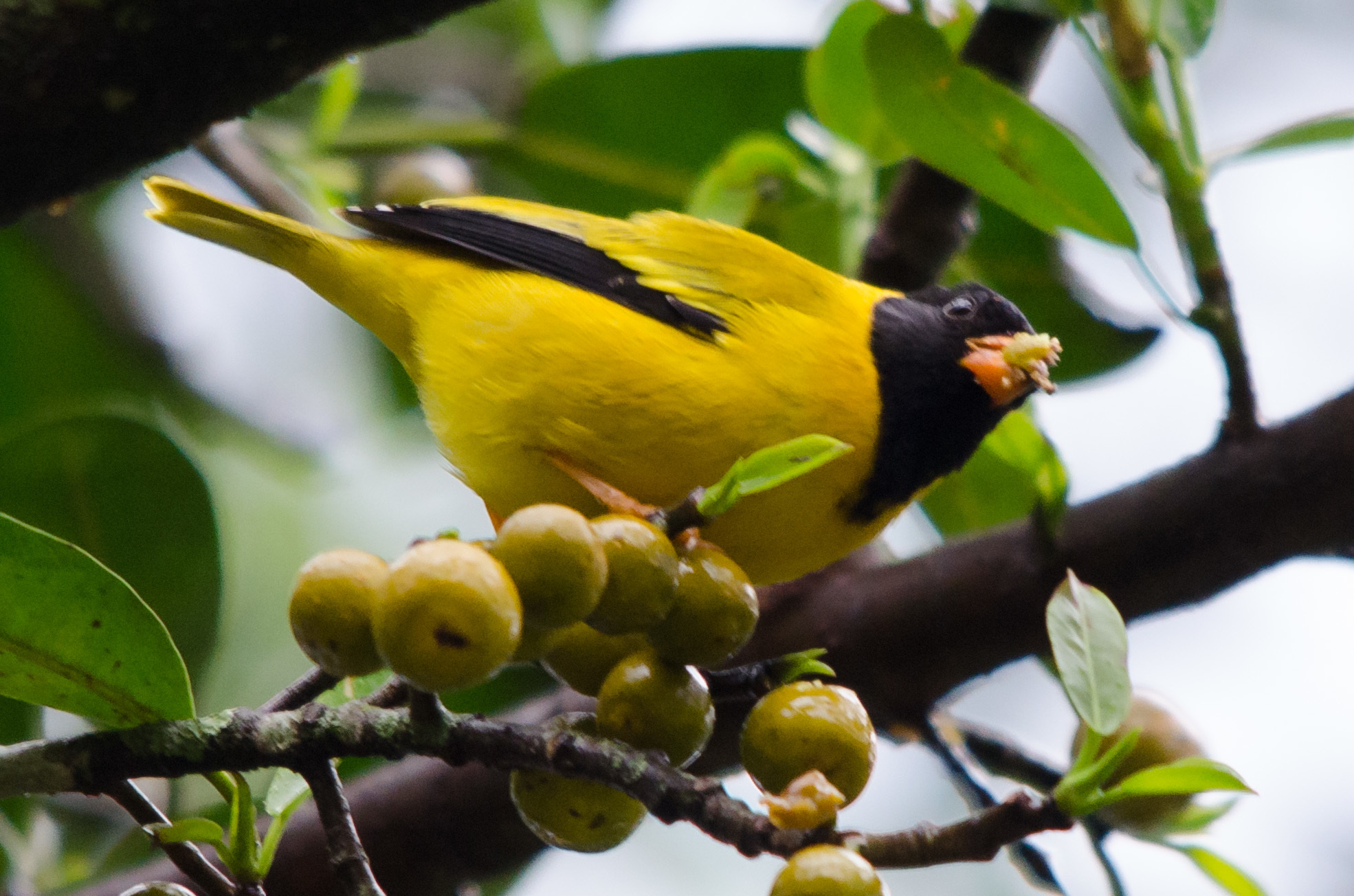

Conservation status
- Least Concern (IUCN 3.1)

Scientific classification
- Kingdom: Animalia
- Phylum: Chordata
- Class: Aves
- Order: Passeriformes
- Family: Fringillidae
- Subfamily: Carduelinae
- Genus: Linurgus; Reichenbach, 1850
- Species: L. olivaceus

Binomial name
- Linurgus olivaceus (Fraser, 1843)

= Oriole finch =

Species of bird

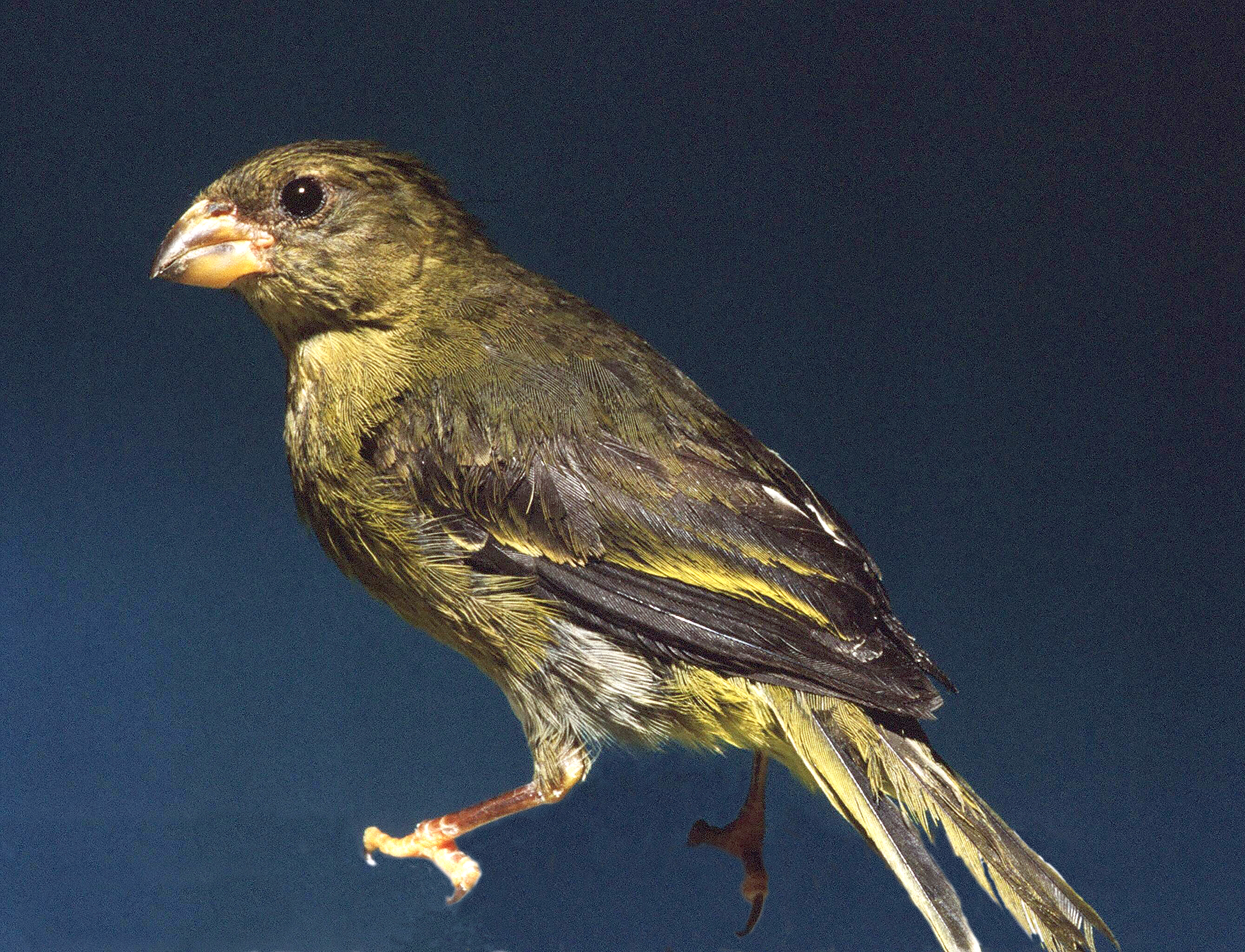
Linurgus olivaceus (female)

The oriole finch (Linurgus olivaceus) is a small passerine bird in the finch family. It is found in Africa and is native to Burundi, Cameroon, Democratic Republic of the Congo, Equatorial Guinea, Kenya, Malawi, Nigeria, Rwanda, South Sudan, Tanzania and Uganda. It lives in subtropical or tropical moist evergreen montane forests.

The male has a black head, a yellow body, black flight feathers and a stout bright yellow-orange conical bill. The female is a dull greenish-olive but has black flight feathers and a yellow bill.

The oriole finch was formally described in 1843 by the British zoologist Louis Fraser under the binomial name Coccothraustes olivaceus. It is now the only species placed in the genus Linurgus that was introduced by Ludwig Reichenbach in 1850. The exact relationship of this species to other finches is unclear. In their phylogenetic analysis published in 2012, Zuccon and colleagues found that the oriole finch was sister to the genus Serinus. This contrasts with an earlier 2009 analysis by Nguembock and colleagues which found that the oriole finch was sister to the genus Carduelis.

Four subspecies are recognised:

- L. o. olivaceus (Fraser, 1843) — Cameroon line
- L. o. prigoginei Schouteden, 1950 — Albertine Rift montane forests
- L. o. elgonensis van Someren, 1918 — Imatong Mountains, Kenya and Uganda
- L. o. kilimensis (Reichenow & Neumann, 1895) — northern Malawi and Tanzania
