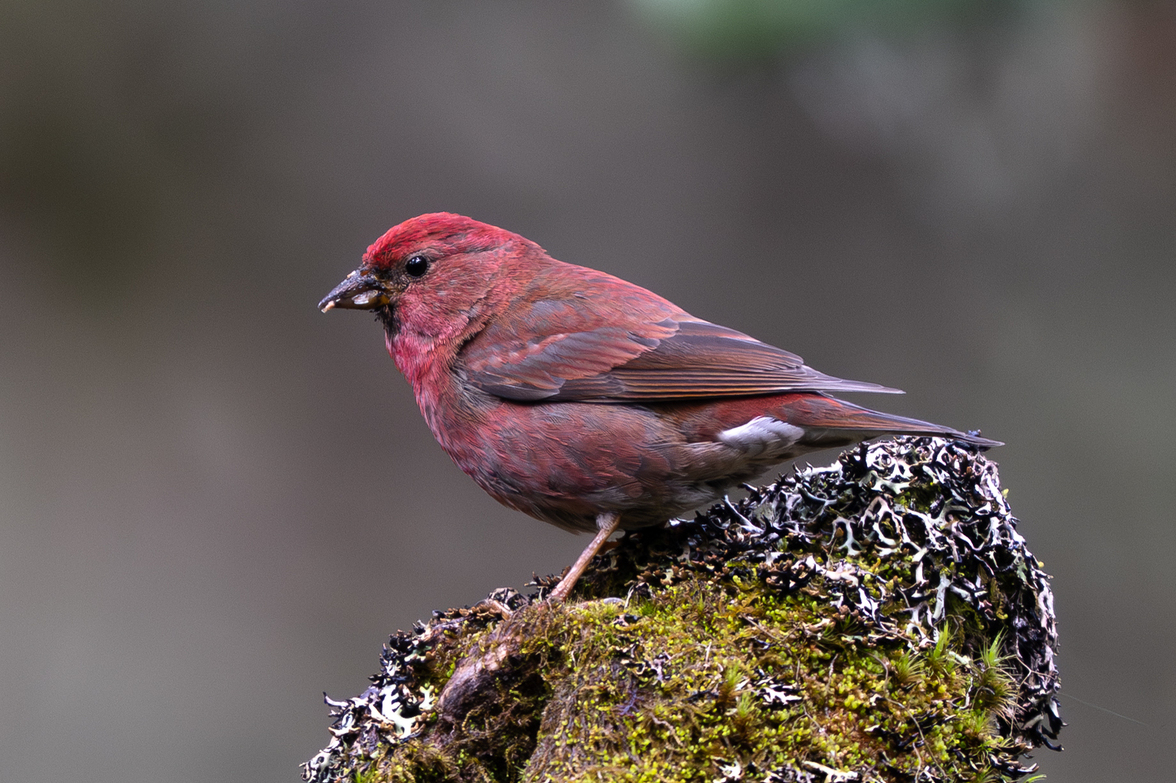
- Male in China
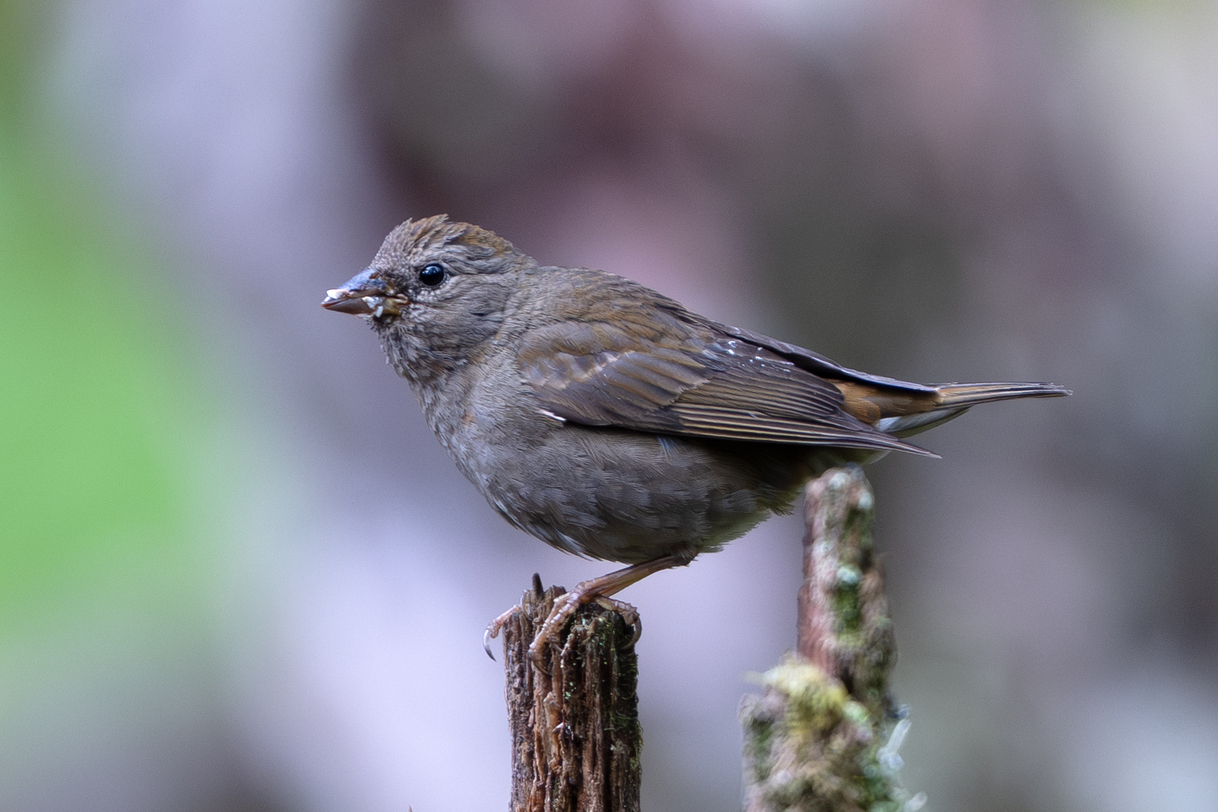
- Female in China

Conservation status
- Least Concern (IUCN 3.1)

Scientific classification
- Kingdom: Animalia
- Phylum: Chordata
- Class: Aves
- Order: Passeriformes
- Family: Fringillidae
- Subfamily: Carduelinae
- Genus: Agraphospiza; Zuccon, Prŷs-Jones, Rasmussen & Ericson, 2012
- Species: A. rubescens

Binomial name
- Agraphospiza rubescens (Blanford, 1872)

= Blanford's rosefinch =

Species of bird

Blanford's rosefinch (Agraphospiza rubescens) or the crimson rosefinch, is a species of finch in the family Fringillidae. It is found in Bhutan, China, India, and Nepal. Its natural habitat is boreal forest.

Blanford's rosefinch was formerly placed in the genus Carpodacus with the other rosefinches. It was moved to the monotypic genus Agraphospiza based on the results from the phylogenetic analyses of mitochondrial and nuclear DNA sequences. It differs from rosefinches in the genus Carpodacus. Both sexes have unstreaked plumage, the bill is thinner and less conical, the wings are more pointed and it has a shorter tail.

Its common name commemorates the English zoologist William Thomas Blanford.
