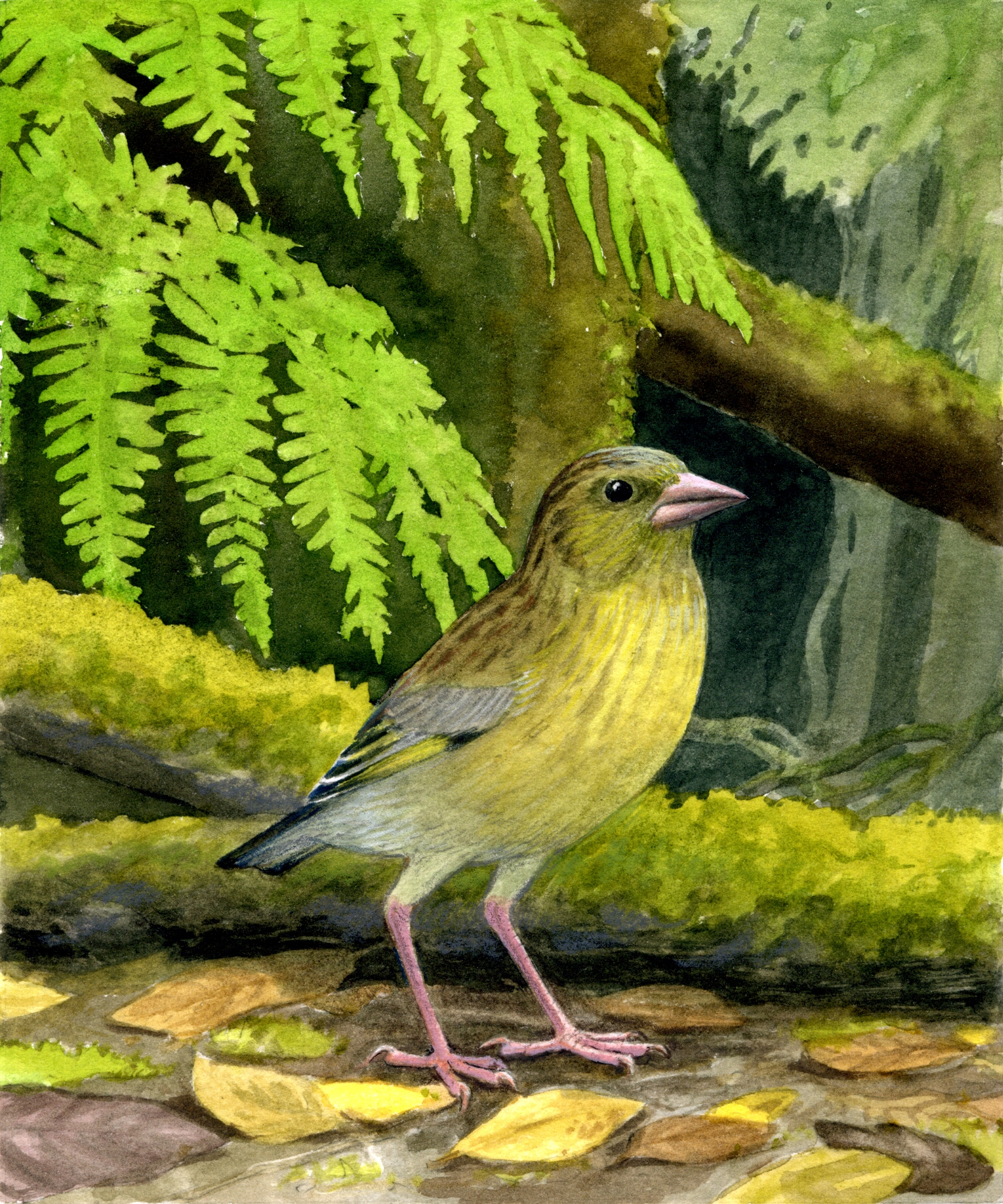
- Restoration

Scientific classification
- Kingdom: Animalia
- Phylum: Chordata
- Class: Aves
- Order: Passeriformes
- Family: Fringillidae
- Subfamily: Carduelinae
- Genus: Chloris
- Species: †C. aurelioi

Binomial name
- †Chloris aurelioi (Rando et al., 2010)

Synonyms
- Carduelis aurelioi

= Slender-billed greenfinch =

Slender-billed greenfinch Temporal range: Holocene

Extinct species of bird

The slender-billed greenfinch (Chloris aurelioi) is an extinct songbird in the finch family Fringillidae. It was endemic to the island Tenerife in the Canary Islands, and became extinct after human settlement of the islands.

== Taxonomy ==
The slender-billed greenfinch was described in 2010 and originally placed in the genus Carduelis with other greenfinches, but living greenfinches were later moved to the separate genus Chloris in 2012. The combination of Chloris aurelioi has not been used in the subsequent academic literature.

== Description ==
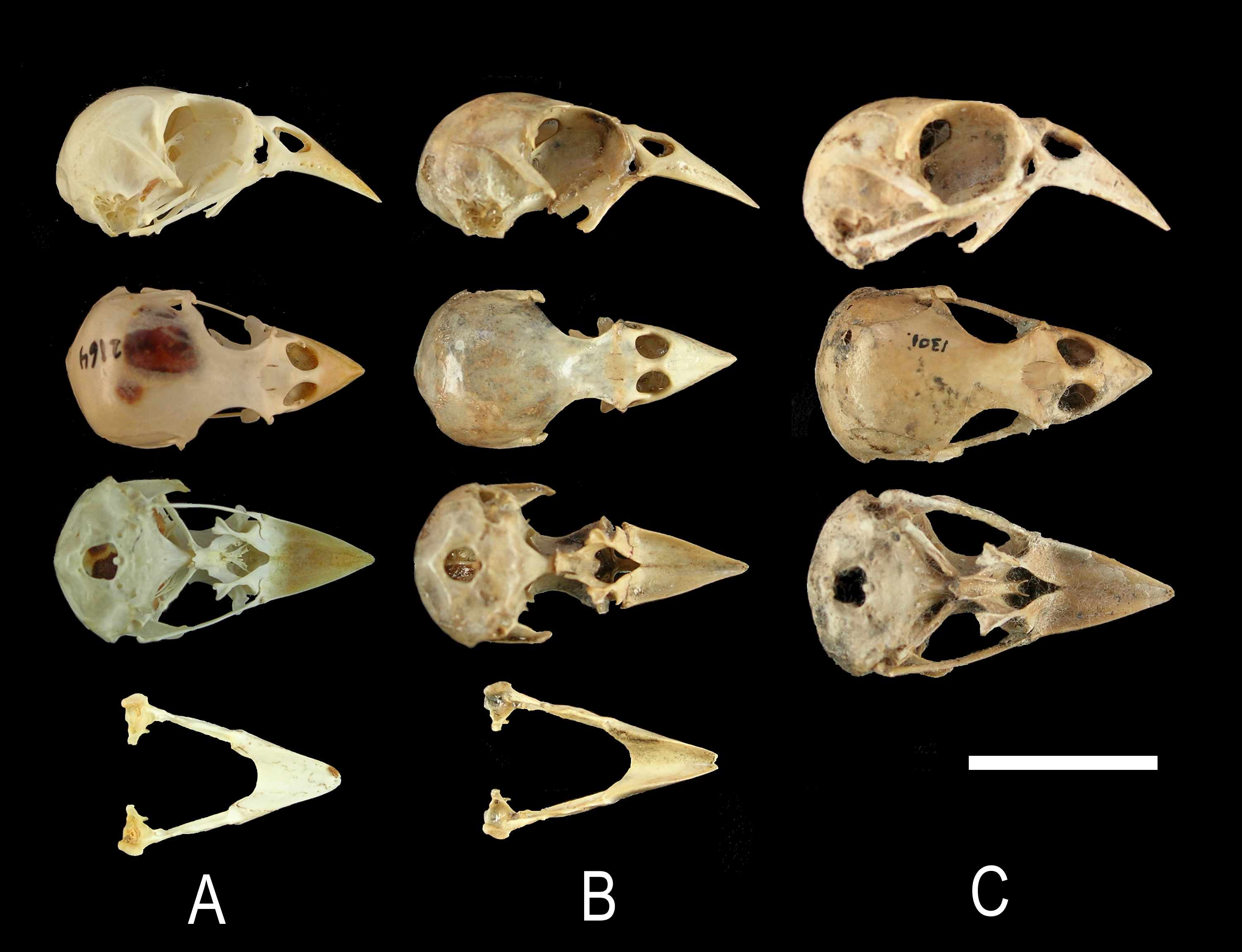
Cranium and mandible of slender-billed greenfinch (B), compared with European greenfinch (A) and Trias greenfinch (C)

The bill of the slender-billed greenfinch was longer, thinner, and more conical than the bills of other greenfinches, more similar in shape to the bills of chaffinches.
