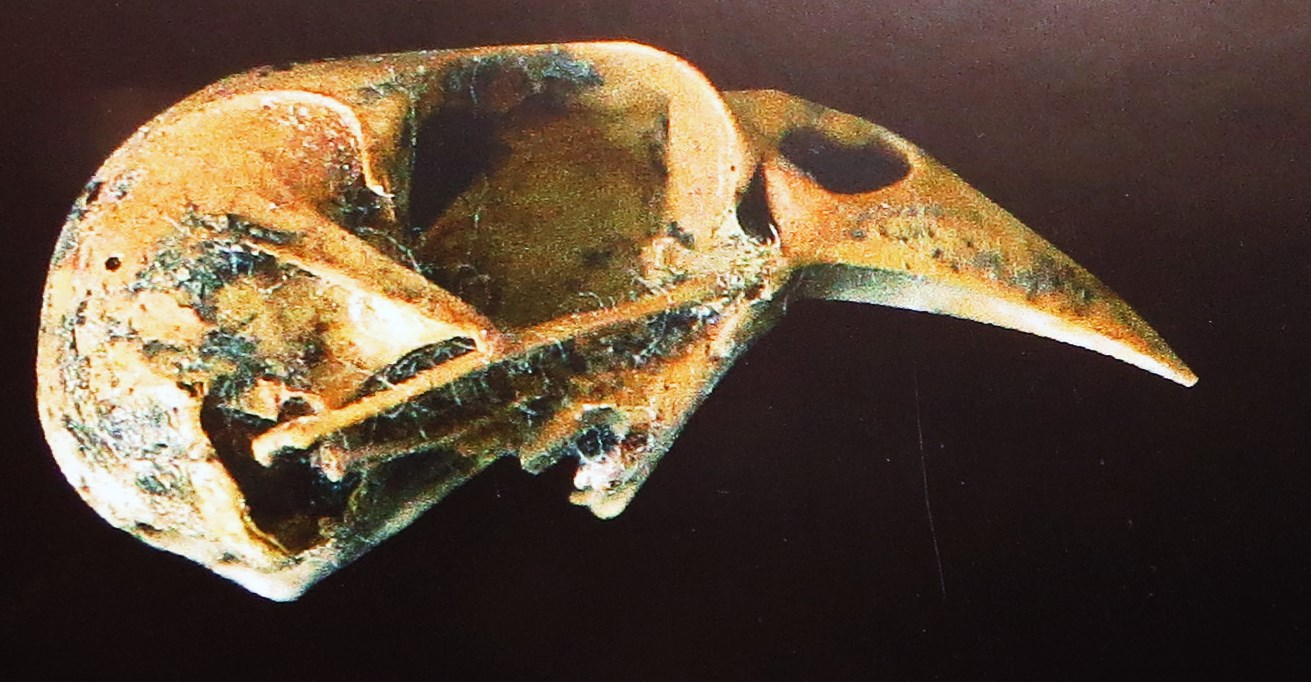
- Skull

Scientific classification
- Kingdom: Animalia
- Phylum: Chordata
- Class: Aves
- Order: Passeriformes
- Family: Fringillidae
- Subfamily: Carduelinae
- Genus: Chloris
- Species: C. triasi

Binomial name
- Chloris triasi (Alcover & F. Florit, 1987)

Synonyms
- Carduelis triasi

= Trias's greenfinch =

Trias's greenfinch Temporal range: Late Pleistocene to Early Holocene

Extinct species of bird

Trias's greenfinch (Chloris triasi) is an extinct species of passerine bird in the finch family. The fossil remains were unearthed in the Cuevas de los Murciélagos near San Andrés y Sauces in the north of La Palma, Canary Islands. The species epithet commemorates Spanish palaeontologist Miquel Trías who collected the holotype together with Josep Antoni Alcover in July 1985.

== Description ==
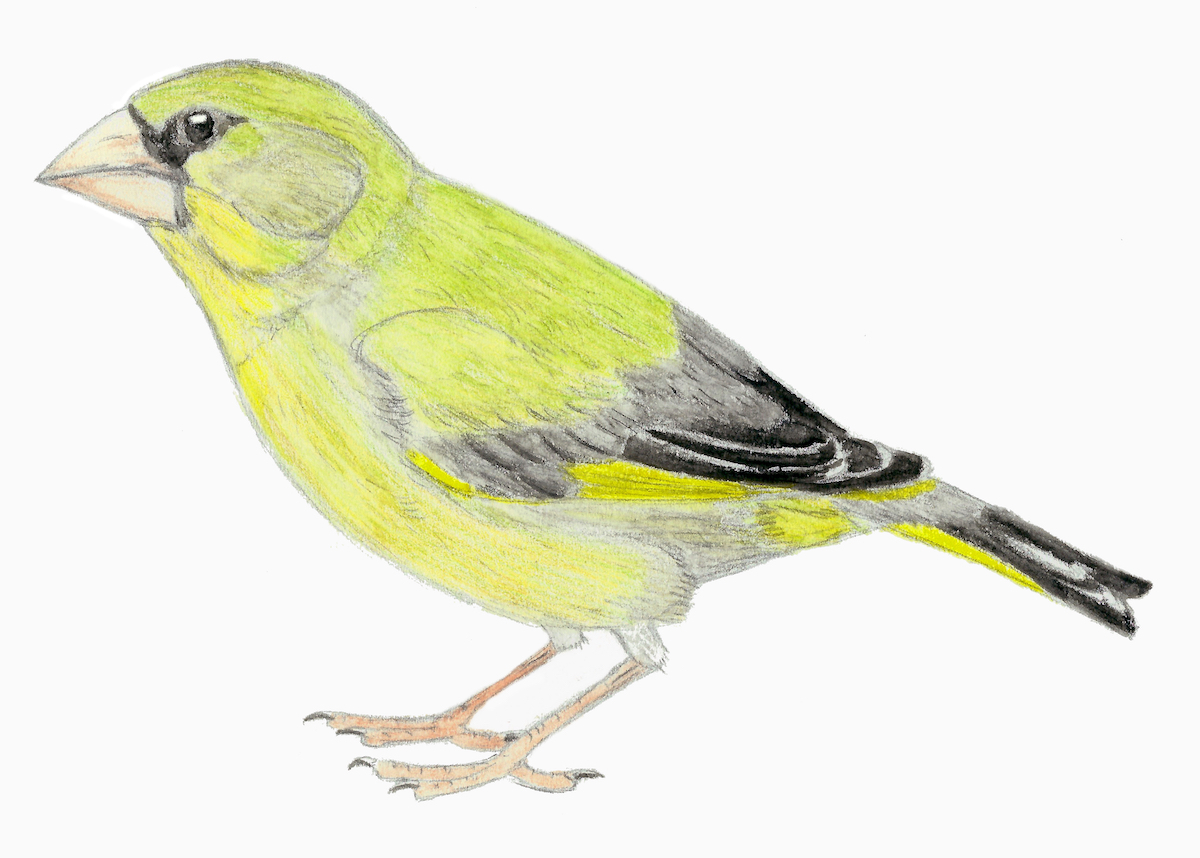
Life restoration, based on known material and European greenfinches

The holotype is an almost complete cranium with both pterygoids but lacking mandible, quadrate bones, and the palatine process of maxilla. The paratypes include a proximal fragment of a right humerus, a distal fragment of a right humerus with a prominent fragmented epicondyle, a left ulna lacking the epiphyseal plate, an almost complete right ulna lacking the olecranon and a complete left carpometacarpus. The cranium length is 34,89 mm, the cranium width is 17,47 mm and the cranium height is 14,31 mm. The maxilla length is 19,10 mm, the maxilla width is 9,67 mm, and the maxilla height is 6,71 mm. The interorbital width is 6,11 mm. The length of the carpometacarpus is 11,69 mm.

Trias's greenfinch was closely related to the European greenfinch (Chloris chloris). However, its head was larger and broader and its bill was about 30 percent larger. Its legs were very long and robust, but compared to the European greenfinch its wings were shorter. This might have been an adaption to more terrestrial habits in the laurel forests.

== Biology ==
Its large bill suggests the assumption that its main diet included large seeds. The shorter wings might have reduced its flight ability which was not necessary due to the lack of predators on La Palma.

== Extinction ==
The fossil material is from layers which are dated to the Late Pleistocene; however, it might have become extinct in the Early Holocene when the first human settlers, accompanied by cats and rats, arrived at the Canary Islands.
