= Greenfinch (disambiguation) =

The greenfinches make up the bird genus Chloris.

Greenfinch may also refer to:

- Greenfinches, female personnel of the Ulster Defence Regiment
- SS Greenfinch, a British coaster in service 1946–1966
