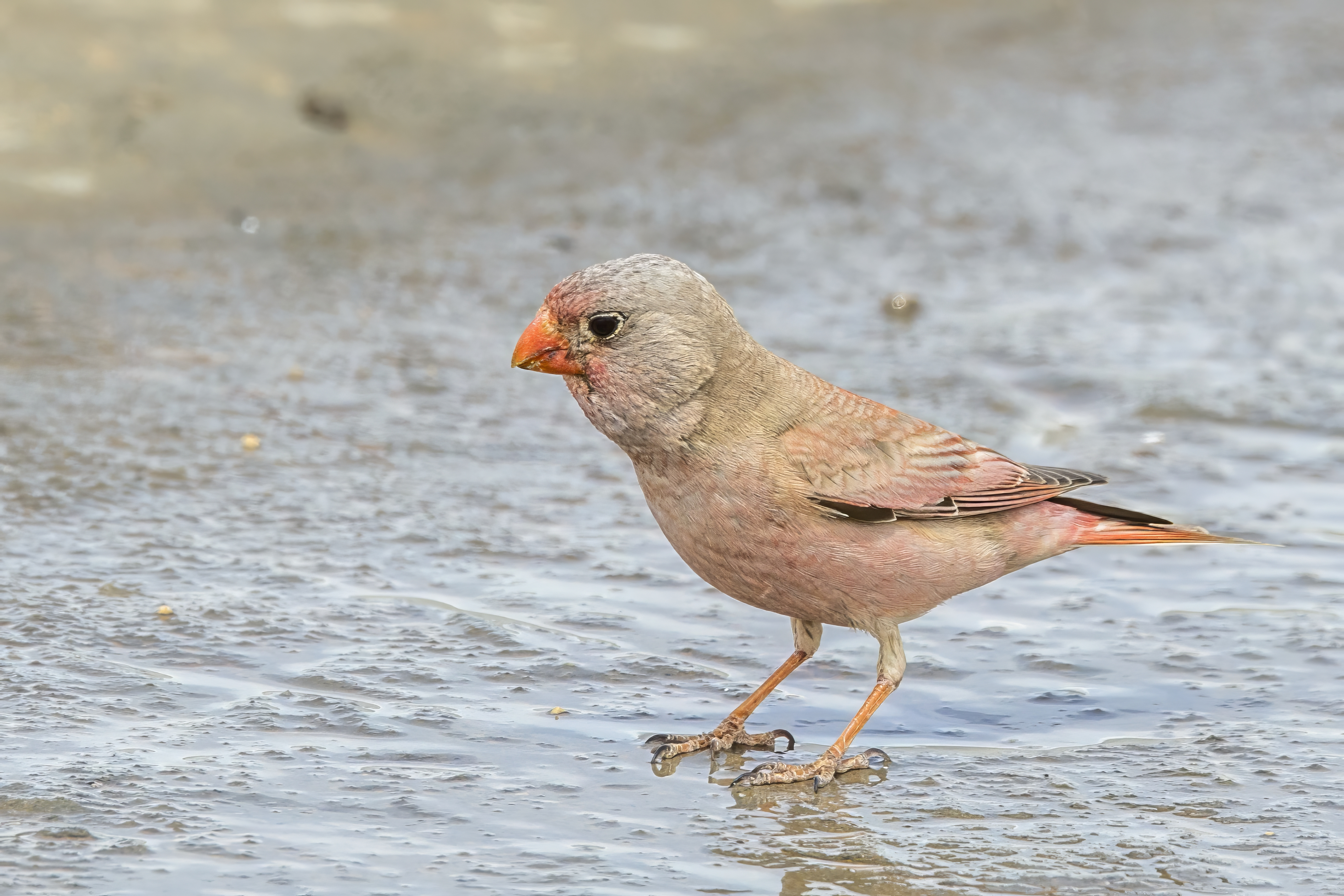

Conservation status
- Least Concern (IUCN 3.1)

Scientific classification
- Kingdom: Animalia
- Phylum: Chordata
- Class: Aves
- Order: Passeriformes
- Family: Fringillidae
- Subfamily: Carduelinae
- Genus: Bucanetes
- Species: B. githagineus

Binomial name
- Bucanetes githagineus (Lichtenstein, MHC, 1823)

Synonyms
- Rhodopechys githaginea

= Trumpeter finch =

Species of bird

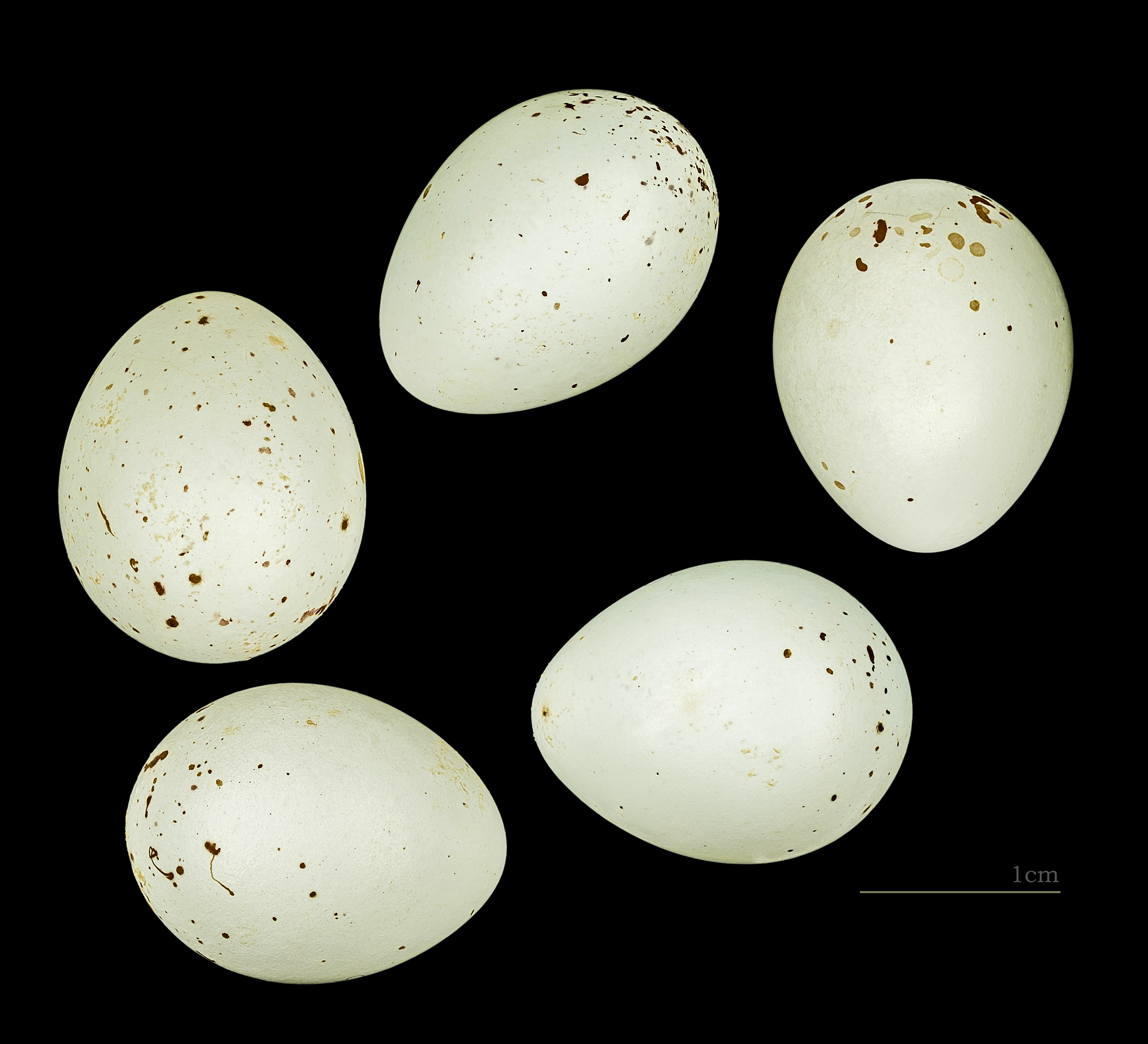
Bucanetes githagineus amantum MHNT

The trumpeter finch (Bucanetes githagineus) is a small passerine bird in the finch family Fringillidae. It is mainly a desert species which is found in North Africa and Spain through to southern Asia. It has occurred as a vagrant in areas north of its breeding range.

== Taxonomy ==
The trumpeter finch was formerly described in 1823 by the German naturalist Hinrich Lichtenstein under the binomial name Fringilla githaginea based on a specimen collected in Upper Egypt. The species is now placed together with Mongolian finch in the genus Bucanetes that was introduced in 1851 by Jean Cabanis. The genus name Bucanetes is from Ancient Greek βυκανητής : bukanētēs (variant transliteration of bykanētēs), "trumpeter"; from βυκάνη : bukánē : "spiral trumpet, horn". The specific name githagineus is Latin from Githago, the corn cockle (from gith, "coriander", and -ago "resembling"). Temminck believed that the bird's name was derived from that of the plant.

The genus name Bucanetes is from Ancient Greek βυκανητής : bukanētēs (variant transliteration of bykanētēs), "trumpeter"; from βυκάνη : bukánē : "spiral trumpet, horn". The specific name githagineus is Latin from Githago, the corn cockle (from gith, "coriander", and -ago "resembling"). Temminck believed that the bird's name was derived from that of the plant.

There are four recognised subspecies:

- B. g. amantum - (Hartert, 1903) - the Canary Islands
- B. g. zedlitzi - (Neumann, 1907) - North Africa and southeastern Spain
- B. g. githagineus (Lichtenstein, MHK, 1823) - Egypt and Sudan
- B. g. crassirostris (Blyth, 1847) - from Turkey and the Sinai Peninsula in the west east through the Middle East and Central Asia to Rajasthan and Haryana in India.

It has been recorded as a vagrant in Great Britain with the first records there both occurring in 1971 in Suffolk and in Sutherland, Channel Island, Denmark, Sweden Germany and Austria. It is possibly a regular migrant in southern Europe away from Spain with records of flocks from Italy and Malta. There was a population in the Algarve in Portugal which originated from escaped cage birds.

== Description ==
The trumpeter finch is a small, long-winged bird. It has a large head and short, very thick bill. The summer male has a red bill, grey head and neck, and pale brown upper parts. The breast, rump and tail are pink, the last having dark terminal feathers. Winter males, females and young birds are a very washed-out version of the breeding male. The song of this bird is a buzzing nasal trill, like a tin trumpet.

== Distribution and habitat ==
The trumpeter finch breeds from the Canary Islands eastwards across North Africa, as far south as Mauritania, Mali and Chad, with isolated populations in Sudan and Ethiopia and Djibouti. In the Middle East, it is found in Egypt east to Iraq and south in the Arabian Peninsula to Yemen and Oman and north into Turkey and Armenia. In central Asia it ranges from Iran north to Kazakhstan and east to India. It has colonised southern Spain where breeding was first proved in 1971.

They are found in desert, semi-desert and the margins of deserts. They can also be found in vast open steppe areas where there are dry desolate hills with sparse low scrubby vegetation, edges of fields, on mountain slopes, in stony plains where there are no trees, cliffs, ravines, gorges and wadis. In the desert regions of northern Africa it can also occur in villages and gardens and in regions of open sandy desert it frequents oases. The European breeding population is found in habitats where there is no tree cover but there is sparse scrub less than a metre in height, while the birds in the Canary Islands nest on sandy plains with halophytic and xerophytic scrub, as well as in more typical habitats.

In the summer of 2005, there was a notable irruption of this species into northwestern Europe, with several birds reaching as far as England.

== Behaviour ==
Trumpeter finches breed from February to June in monogamous pairs. The female builds a simple nest made of a loose collection of twigs, plant stems, down and fibres such as animal hair, grass fibres and sometimes feathers. It is placed in a shallow depression in the ground, in the shade of a rock, bush or a tussock of grass. It may also be situated as high as to six metres (20 ft) above ground in a pipe or wall. The clutch is normally 4–6 eggs. They are mainly vegetarian and their diet consists of small seeds, shoots and buds of grasses and low ground-loving plants. They will eat some insects as well, mainly grasshoppers. Trumpeter finches can be resident, dispersive or nomadic. They can occur in pairs or they form flocks of up to 20 individuals; larger flocks can form outside the breeding season, frequently made up of largely juvenile birds, rarely reaching 1,000 birds. In then Canary Islands they form mixed flocks with common linnets and Spanish sparrows. They will fly quite long distances in the late afternoons and in the evenings to find drinking water. The population in Spain is supported by birds dispersing from North Africa joining its population.

== Gallery ==
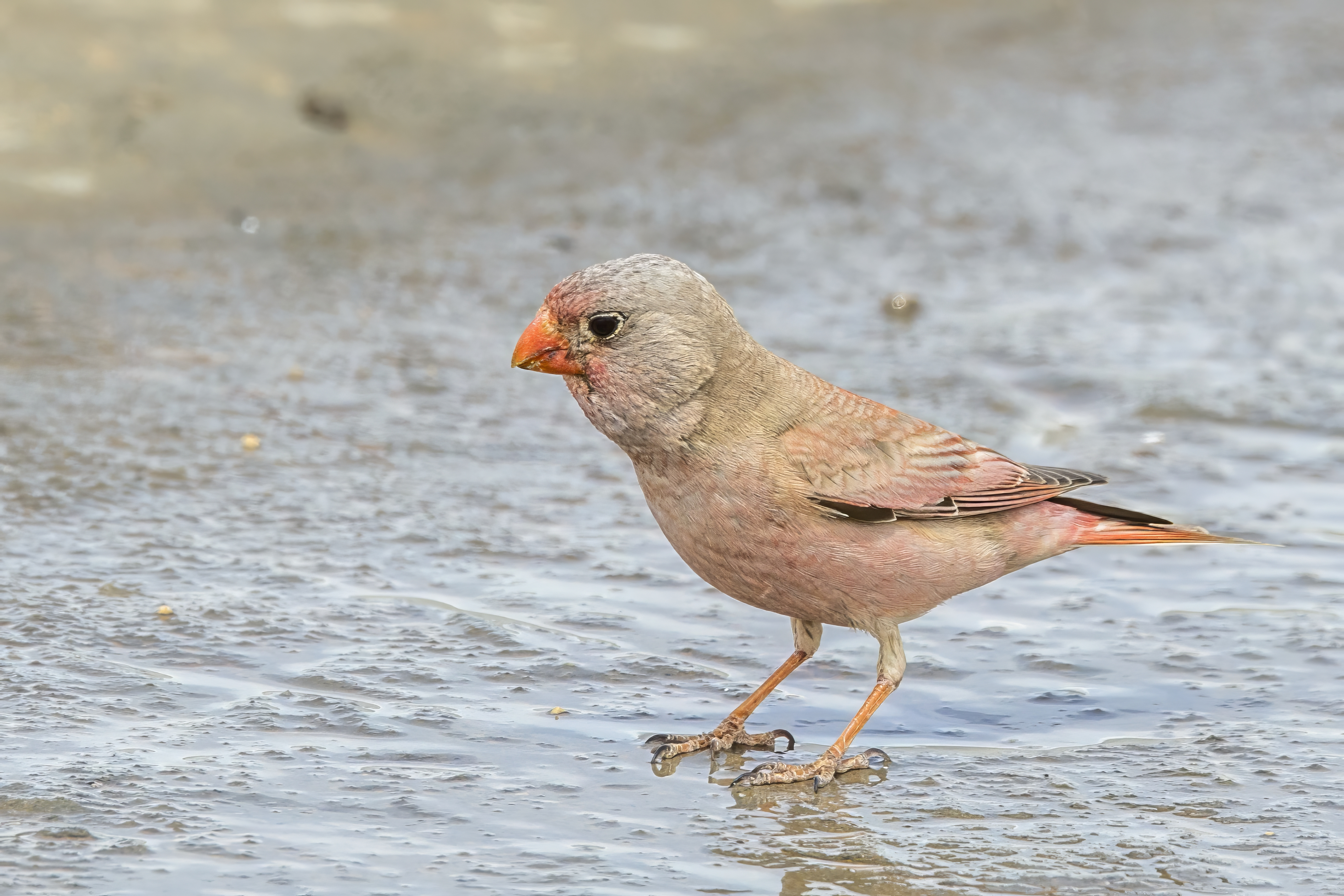
male B. g. githagineus
Kebili, Tunisia

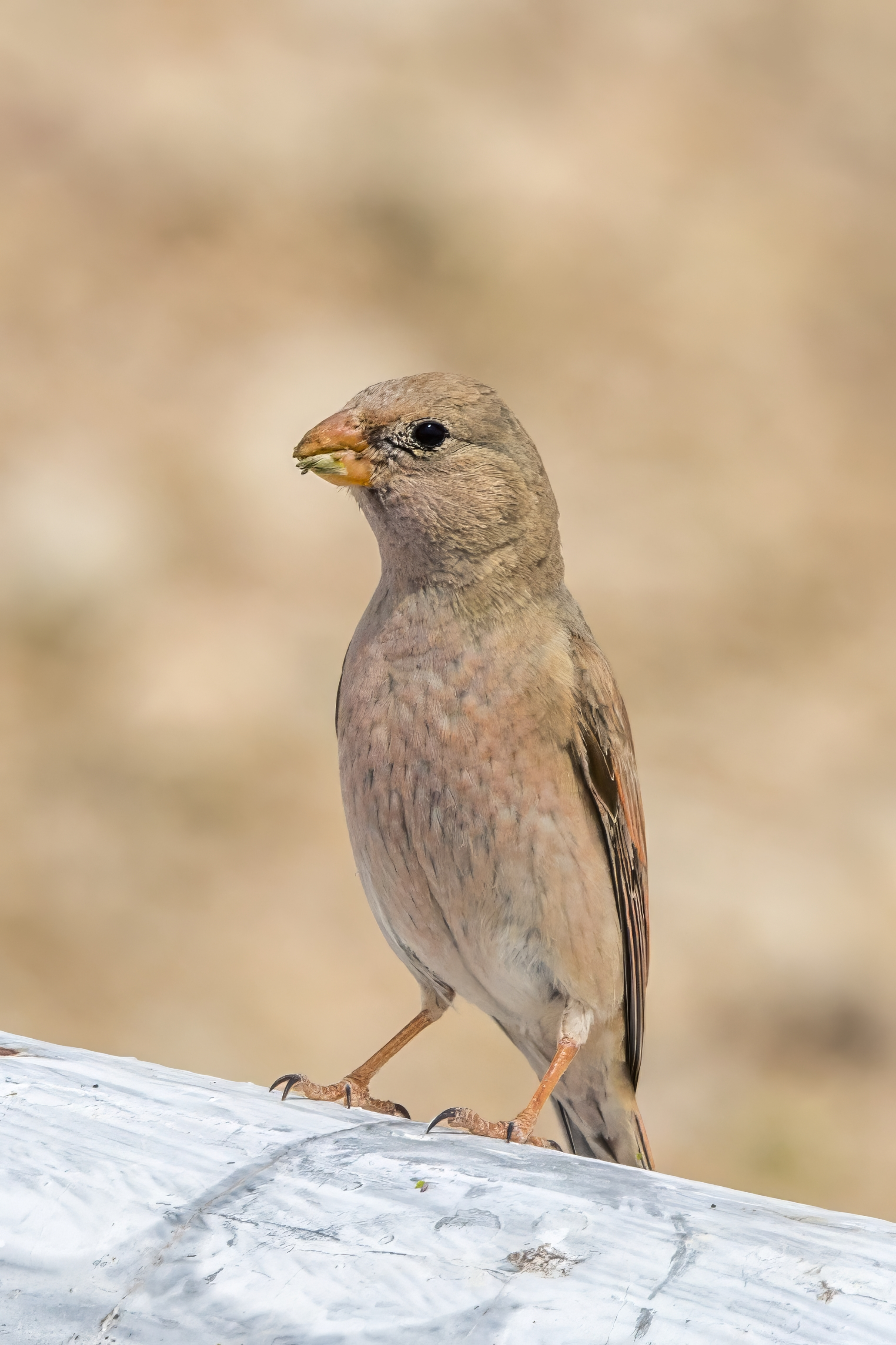
female B. g. githagineus
Kebili, Tunisia

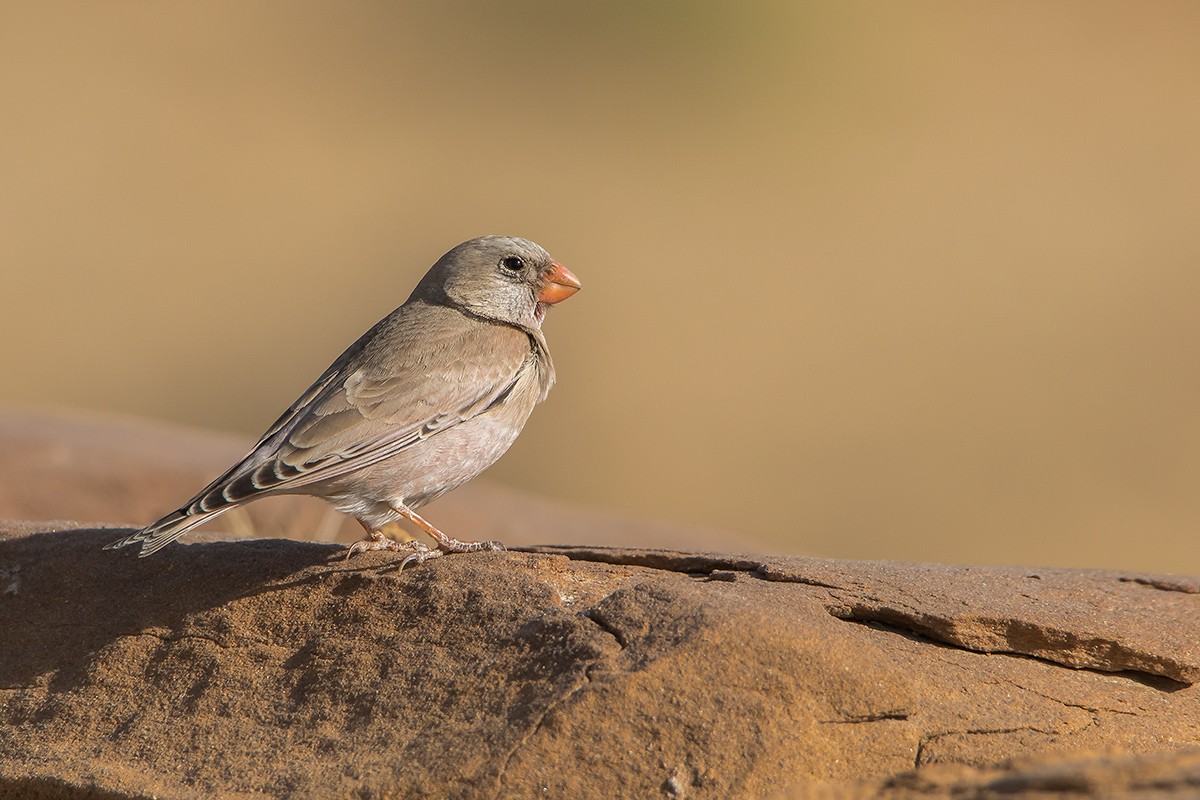
Male, B. g. crassirostris
Rajasthan, India
