= Cuevas de los Murciélagos =

Collection of volcanoes on La Palma, Canary Islands

- Bat Caves
- Interactive map of Cuevas de los Murciélagos
- Location: San Andrés y Sauces, La Palma, Canary Islands
- Coordinates: 28°45′45″N 17°50′24″W
- Length: 100 m
- Geology: Lava tube
- Difficulty: none

The Cuevas de los Murciélagos are a complex of two volcanic caves on La Palma, Canary Islands. They are located at the Nacientes de Marcos y Cordero (springs of Marcos and Cordero) near the municipality of San Andrés y Sauces in the north of the island. Cueva de los Murciélagos I is located in an altitude of 1220 m, Cueva de los Murciélagos II in an altitude of 1000 m. Both caves have a length of 100 m. The access is not difficult. Though it is a descending tube it is good to walk. On the endpoint of the Cueva de los Murciélagos I is a small firepit in the soil which is slightly more complicated to access. In some areas it has a steep slope. It's a rather old cave where erosion caused by the years is evident, hence the debris is very abundant and they are large blocks of terrestrial material.

The caves host an important breeding colony of the Canary big-eared bat. In the 1980s the Cueva de los Murciélagos I become known as paleontological site where fossil remains of the La Palma giant lizard (Gallotia auaritae) and the Trias greenfinch (Carduelis triasi) were unearthed.
