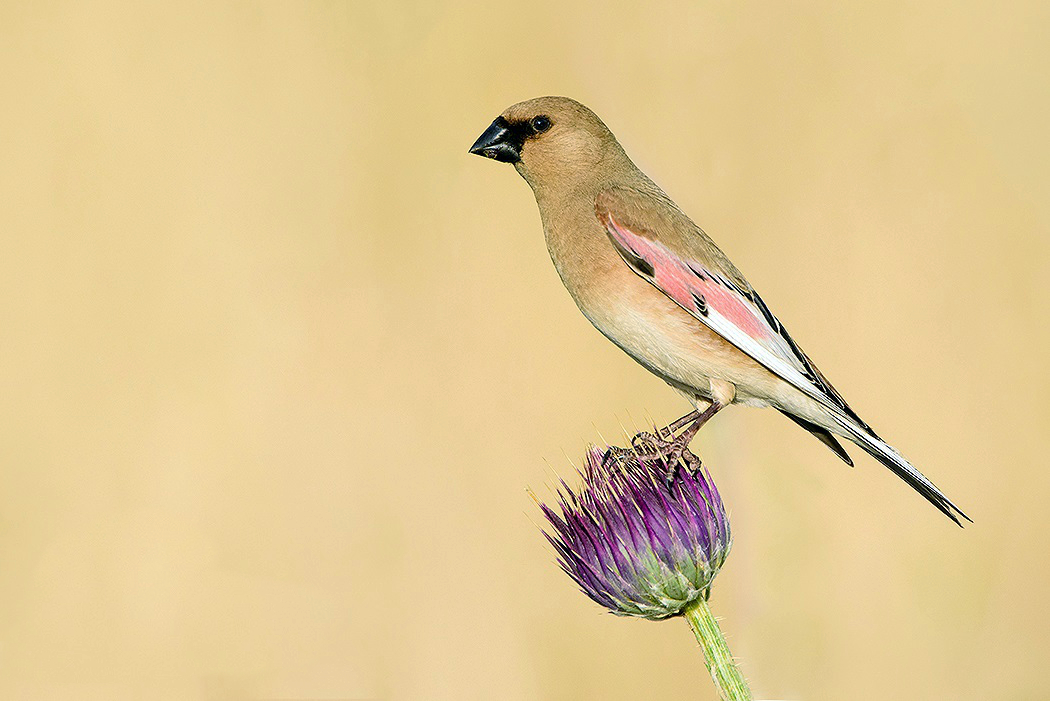
- Desert finch in Iran

Conservation status
- Least Concern (IUCN 3.1)

Scientific classification
- Kingdom: Animalia
- Phylum: Chordata
- Class: Aves
- Order: Passeriformes
- Family: Fringillidae
- Subfamily: Carduelinae
- Genus: Rhodospiza; Sharpe, 1888
- Species: R. obsoleta

Binomial name
- Rhodospiza obsoleta (Lichtenstein, MHC, 1823)

Synonyms
- Fringilla obsoleta Lichtenstein, MHC, 1823; Bucanetes obsoletus Cabanis, 1851; Carduelis obsoleta Rhodopechys obsoleta Chloris obsoleta

= Desert finch =

Species of bird

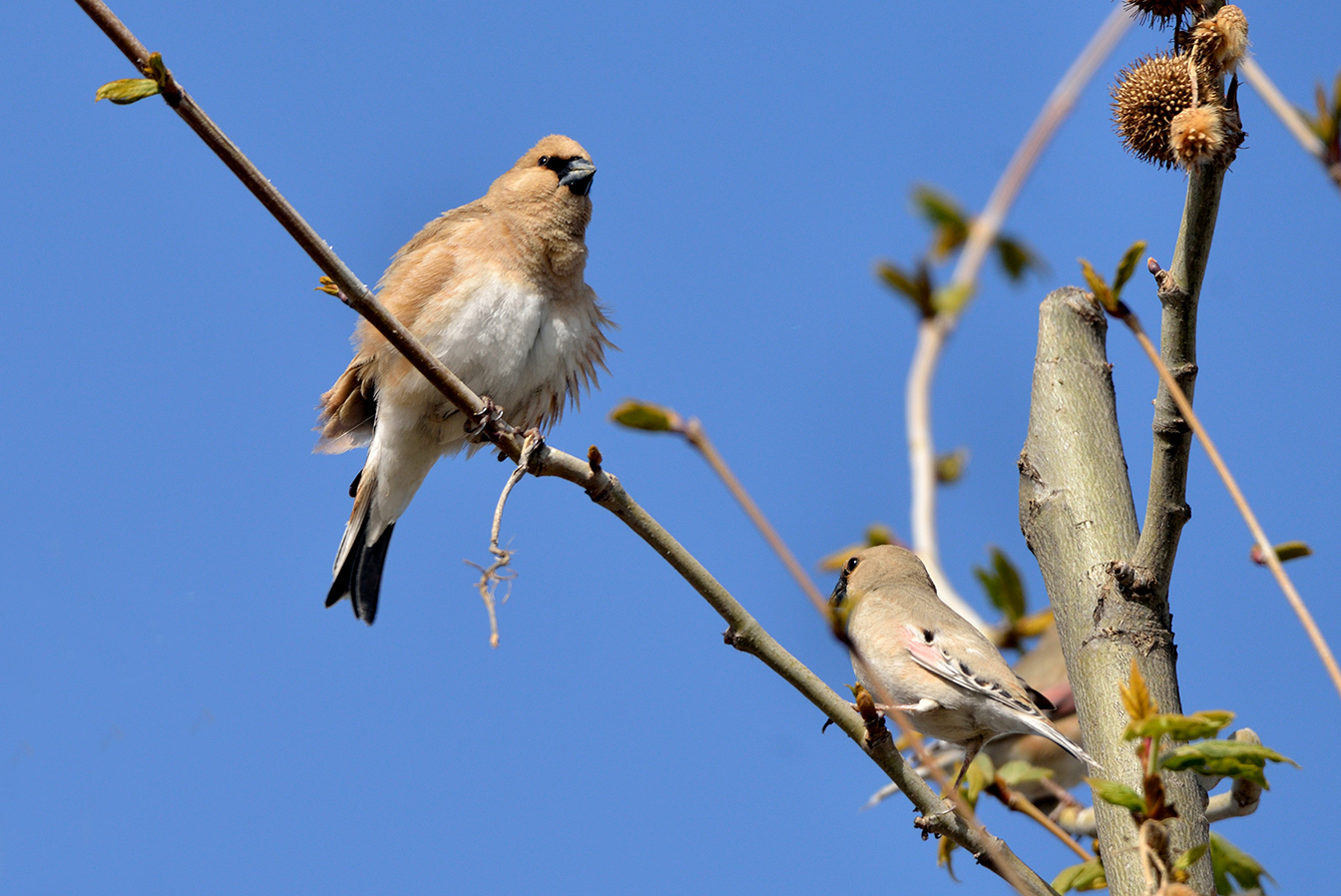
Rhodospiza obsoleta

The desert finch (Rhodospiza obsoleta), sometimes called Lichtenstein's desert finch, is a large brown true finch found in southern Eurasia. Its taxonomy is confused, and it has formerly been placed in Fringilla, Bucanetes, Carduelis and Rhodopechys.

== Taxonomy ==
Recent research by Zamora et al. (2006) has revealed that the desert finch is more closely related to the greenfinches of the genus Chloris, as indicated by DNA sequence analysis, vocalizations, and the presence of a black eye-stripe. Genetically, it seems very close to the common ancestor of the greenfinches. It may be that the latter evolved from a desert form and later developed the green plumage, or that the common ancestor of the greenfinches and the desert finch (which lived around 6 million years ago) was a species of semiarid habitat which subsequently diverged into a truly desert-adapted lineage, today represented by the desert finch, and the ancestor of a woodlands lineage, the greenfinches.

== Description ==
It has an average wingspan of 26 centimetres (10 in). It has a stout black bill, black and white remiges and rectrices, and a slash of rosy-pink on each wing. The female is more dull in color than the male, but other than that the adult sexes are similar in color pattern.

== Ecology ==
The desert finch is indeed a desert resident in areas where water is readily available, but it can also be found in low mountains and foothills, and in cultivated valleys.

This species does not migrate except locally. The desert finch congregates near rural and remote human settlements, and the well-watered orchard in otherwise arid land is an ideal habitat. It can be found in feeding in large flocks of its own species or mixed finch flocks.

It feeds on seeds and the occasional insect. Nesting occurs in trees in the spring, often in fruit trees in orchards, and the female lays and incubates 4 to 6 pale green, lightly speckled eggs.

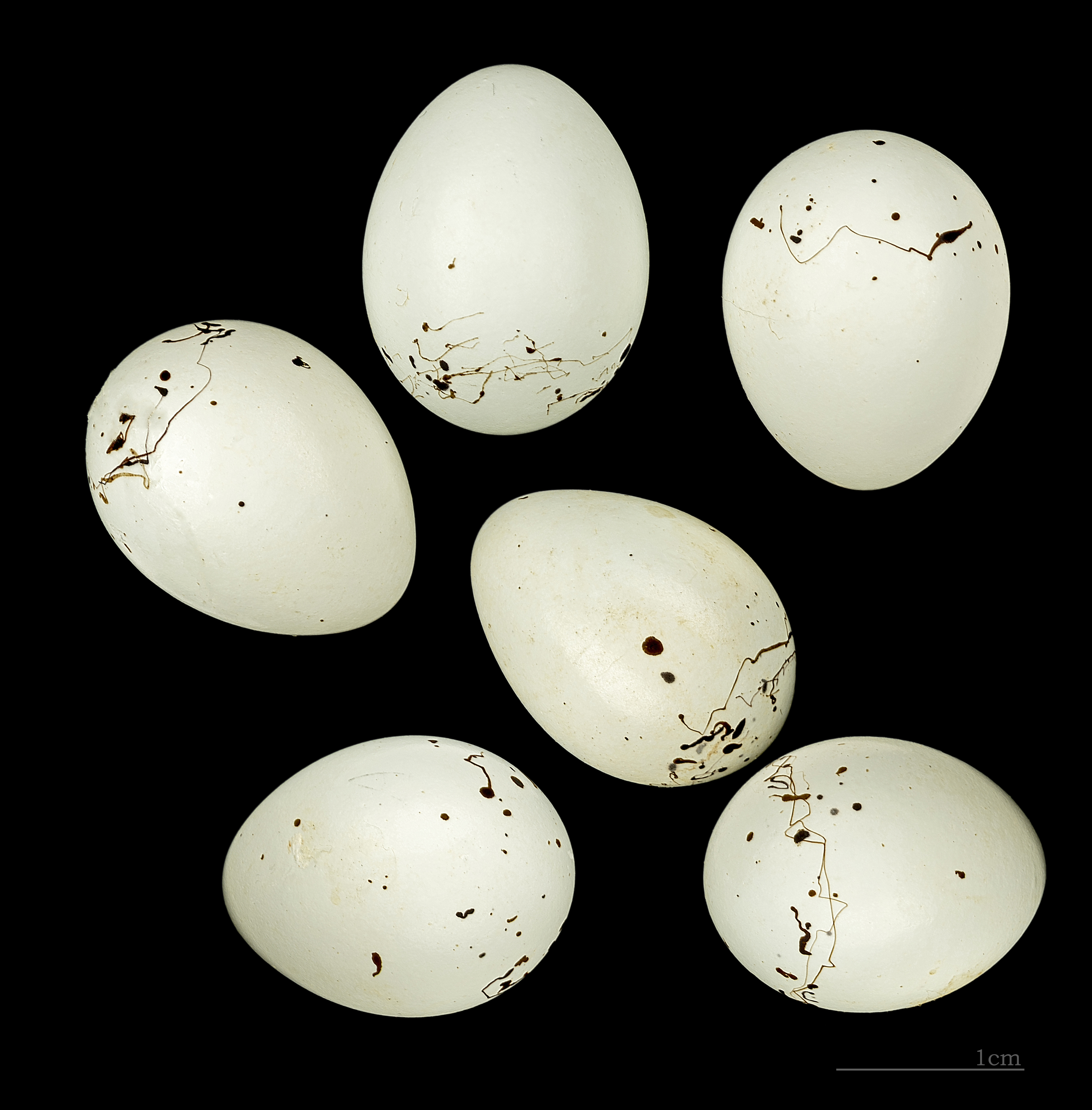
Eggs of Rhodospiza obsoleta MHNT
