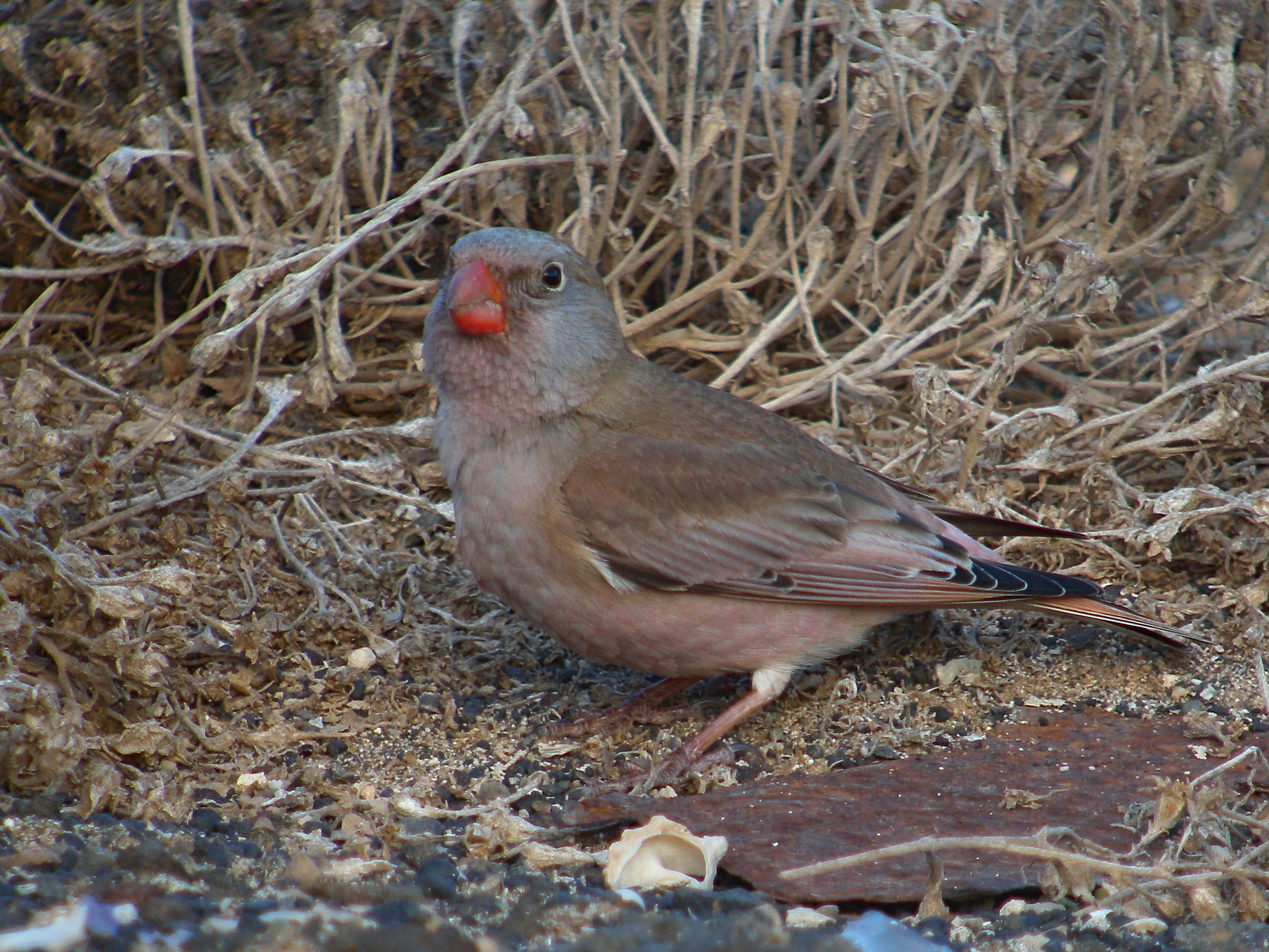
- Trumpeter finch, Bucanetes githagineus

Scientific classification
- Kingdom: Animalia
- Phylum: Chordata
- Class: Aves
- Order: Passeriformes
- Family: Fringillidae
- Subfamily: Carduelinae
- Genus: Bucanetes; Cabanis, 1851

Species
- See text

= Bucanetes =

Genus of birds

Bucanetes is a genus of passerine birds in the finch family. It contains the following two species:

Genus Bucanetes – Cabanis, 1851 – two species
Common name	Scientific name and subspecies	Range	Size and ecology	IUCN status and estimated population
Trumpeter finch	Bucanetes githagineus (Lichtenstein, MHC, 1823) Four subspecies: B. g. amantum - (Hartert, 1903); B. g. zedlitzi - (Neumann, 1907); B. g. githagineus (Lichtenstein, MHK, 1823); B. g. crassirostris (Blyth, 1847)	Canary Islands, across north Africa, and in the Middle East and into central Asia	Size: Habitat: Diet:	LC
Mongolian finch	Bucanetes mongolicus (Swinhoe, 1870)	Afghanistan, Armenia, Azerbaijan, China, Pakistan, Iran, Kazakhstan, Kyrgyzstan, Mongolia, India, Nepal, Russia, Tajikistan, Turkey and Uzbekistan	Size: Habitat: Diet:	LC

The genus name is from Ancient Greek bukanetes, "trumpeter".
