= San Andrés y Sauces =

- Municipality
- Flag Coat of arms

- Location in Canary Islands
- Coordinates: 28°48′20″N 17°46′30″W
- Country: Spain
- Autonomous community: Canary Islands
- Province: Santa Cruz de Tenerife
- Island: La Palma

Area
  - Total: 42.75 km^{2} (16.51 sq mi)

Population (2025-01-01)
  - Total: 4,350
  - Density: 102/km^{2} (264/sq mi)

San Andrés y Sauces is a municipality on the island of La Palma, Province of Santa Cruz de Tenerife, Canary Islands, Spain. It is situated in the northeastern part of the island. The population of the municipality is 4,473 (2013) and the area is 42.75 km². The elevation of the largest village Los Sauces is 250 m. Los Sauces is 14 km north of the island capital Santa Cruz de La Palma. The municipality takes its name from the villages Los Sauces (the seat of the municipality) and San Andrés, 1.5 km southeast of Los Sauces, at the coast.

== Economy ==
The main crops are bananas and the root vegetable taro (Colocasia esculenta), locally called ñame. A minor crop is sugar cane, which serves for the only distillery in the land that manufactures Ron Aldea, a rum.

== Points of interest ==
- The laurel forest of Los Tilos
- Traditional architecture, mainly in San Andrés
- Puerto Espíndola, a small fishing port
- Cuevas de los Murciélagos, volcanic caves that are home to several bat species. Interesting fossils were found in the 1980s.

== Historical population ==
Year	Population
1991	5,392
1996	5,438
2001	5,351
2002	5,226
2003	5,102
2004	5,012
2013	4,473
2023	4,219

== Sports ==
=== Los Sauces Sports Center ===
The municipality offers the following facilities for sports practice:

- Municipal Sports Pavilion, with a capacity of approximately 1300 people. It includes a gym and annexes.

- Municipal Football Field of Llano Clara, with artificial turf and a capacity of approximately 2000 people.

- Municipal padel courts; three courts in Las Lomadas. - Municipal Sports Center of Los Galguitos.

- Municipal Sports Center of San Andrés. - Beach Volleyball Court in Puerto Espíndola.

=== Sports clubs in the municipality ===
- Unión Deportiva San Andrés y Sauces, a football team competing in the men's Primera Regional.

- La Escuela de Fútbol La Unión, together with Barlovento and Puntallana.

- Club Baloncesto Sauces, a basketball team from Los Sauces.

- Club de Gimnasia Rítmica Adeyahamen – Nogales, together with Puntallana.

- Club de Lucha Bediesta, specializing in Canarian wrestling.

- Club de Pádel Los Tilos (part of the Canary Islands Padel Federation).

== Gallery ==
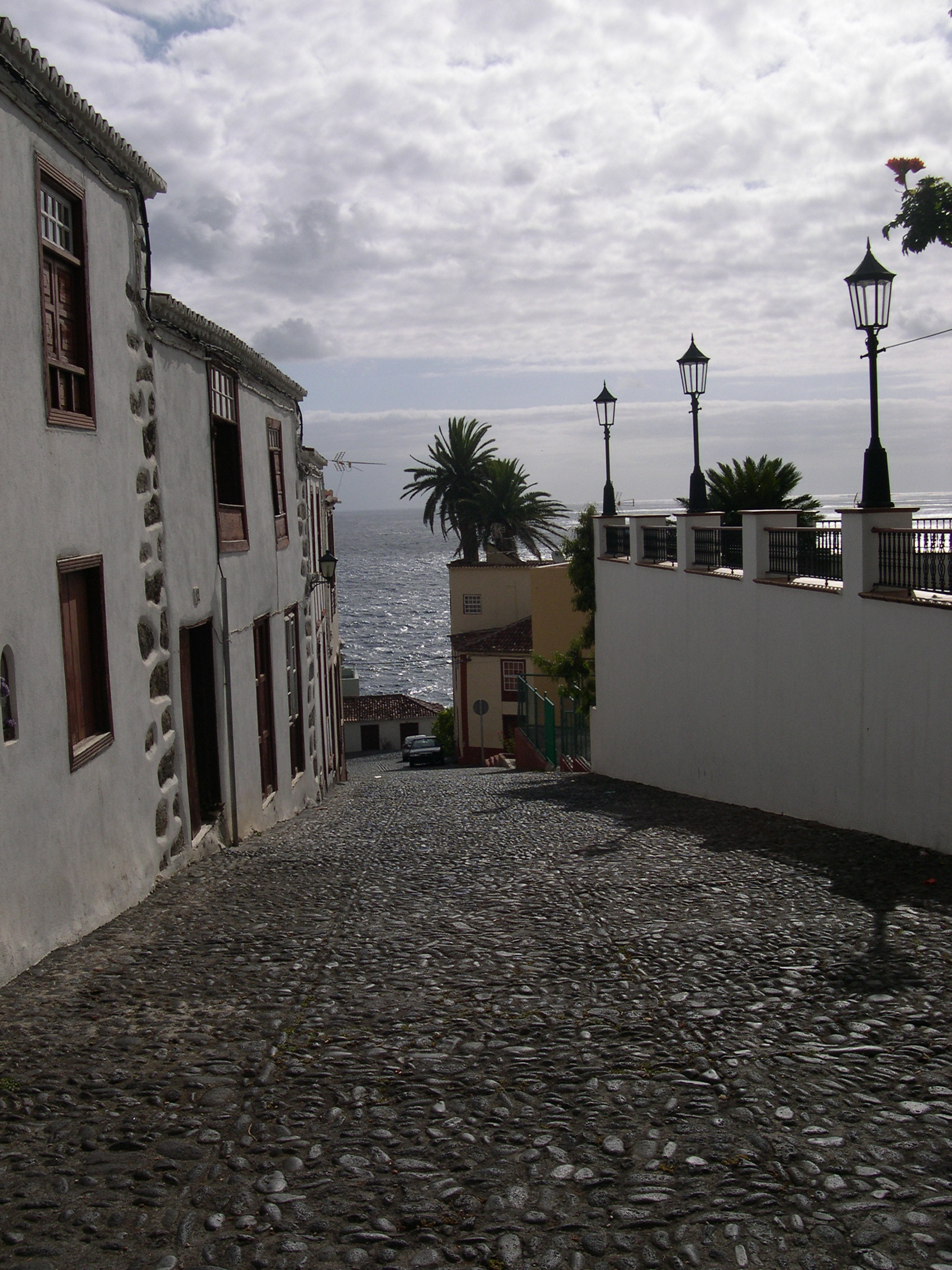
San Andrés

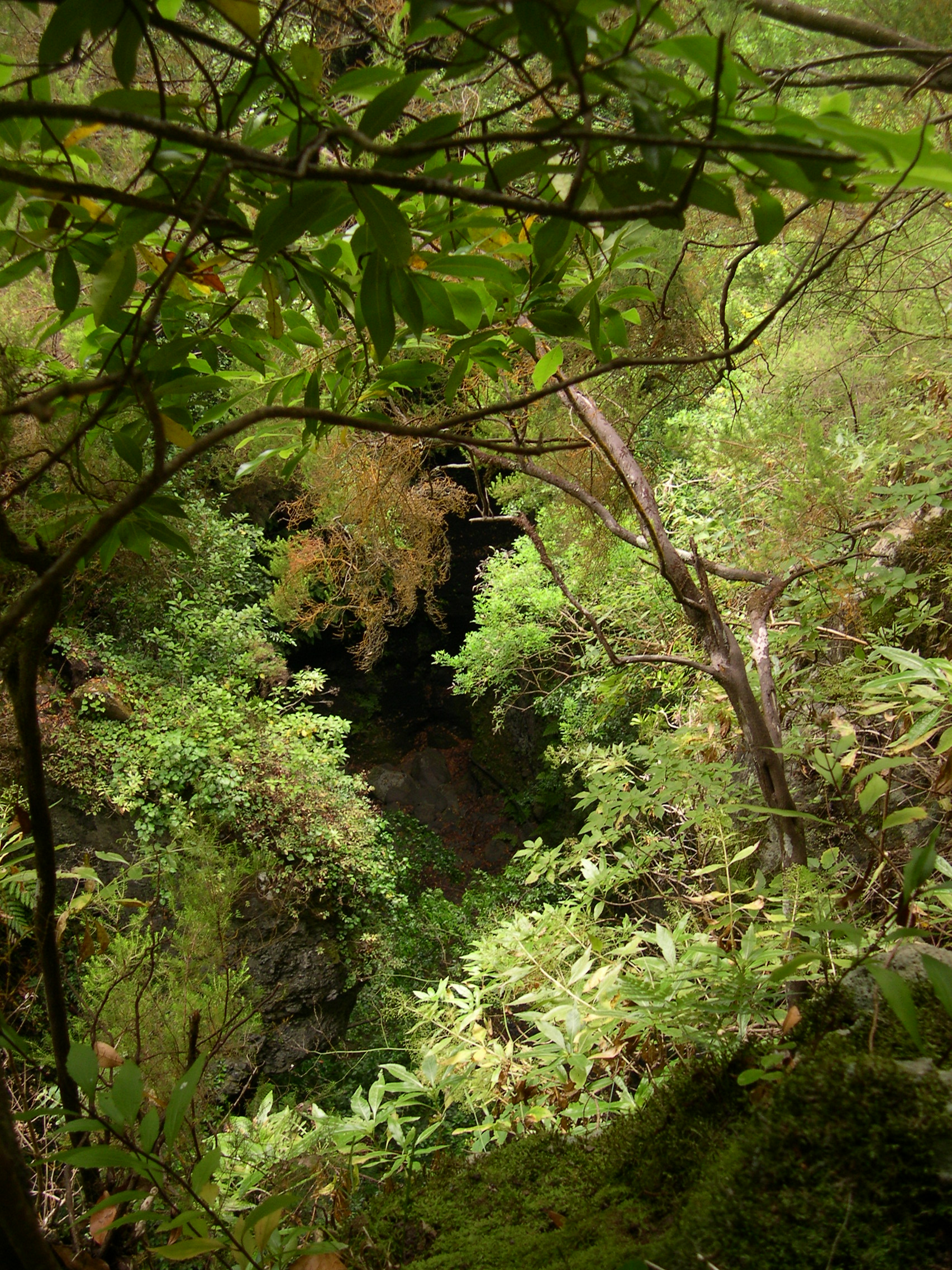
Los Tilos

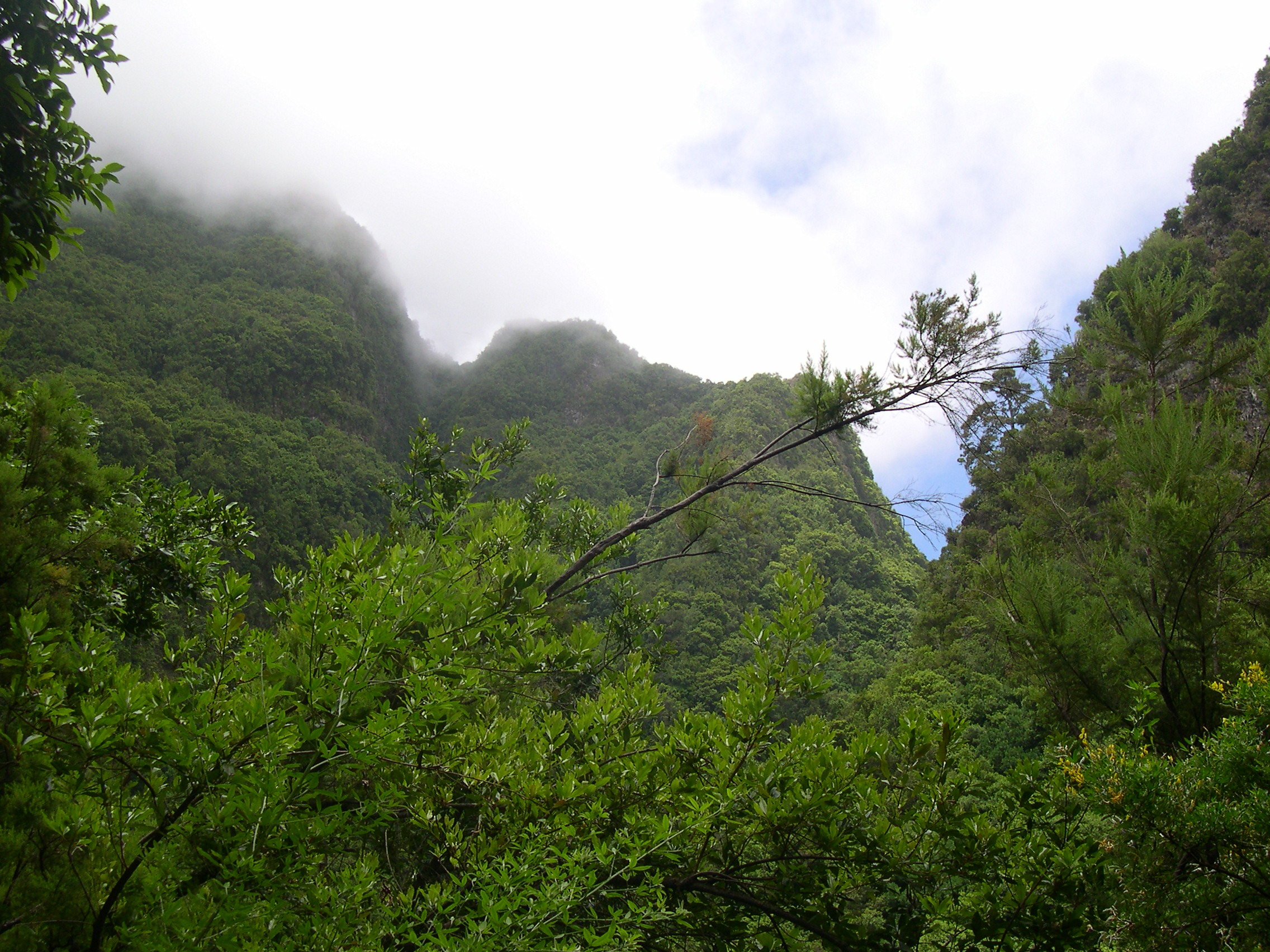
Los Tilos

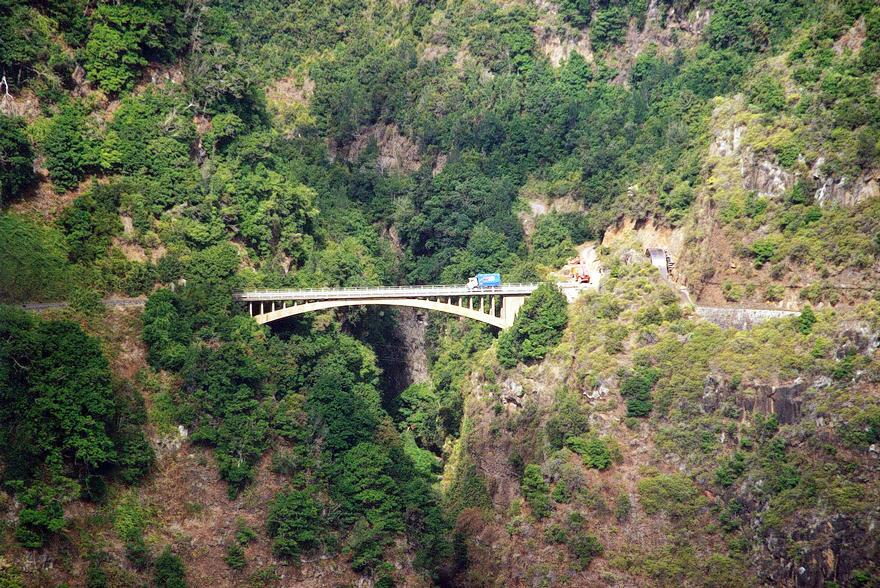
Barranco de la Fuente

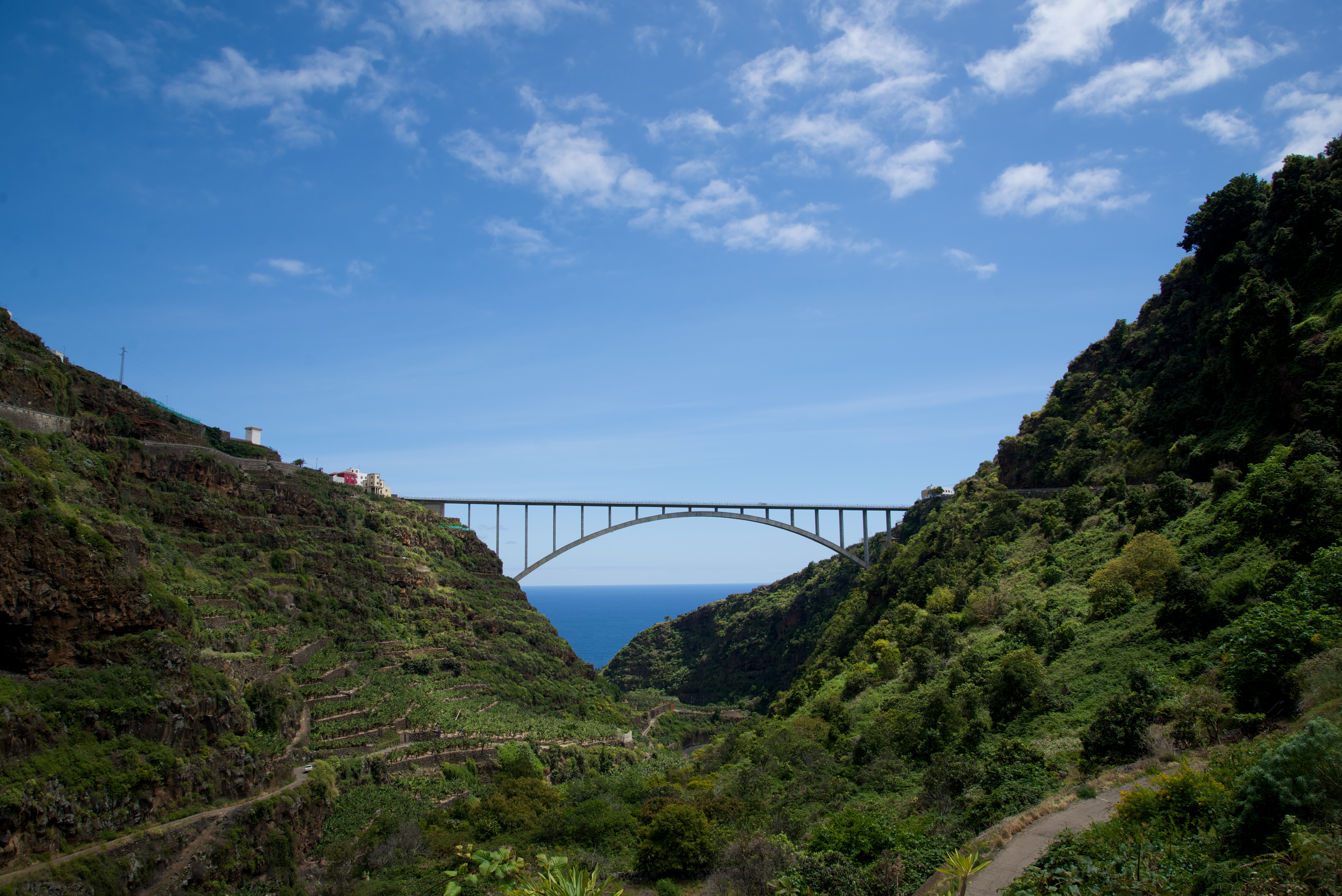
El Puente de Los Tilos

== See also ==
- List of municipalities in Santa Cruz de Tenerife
