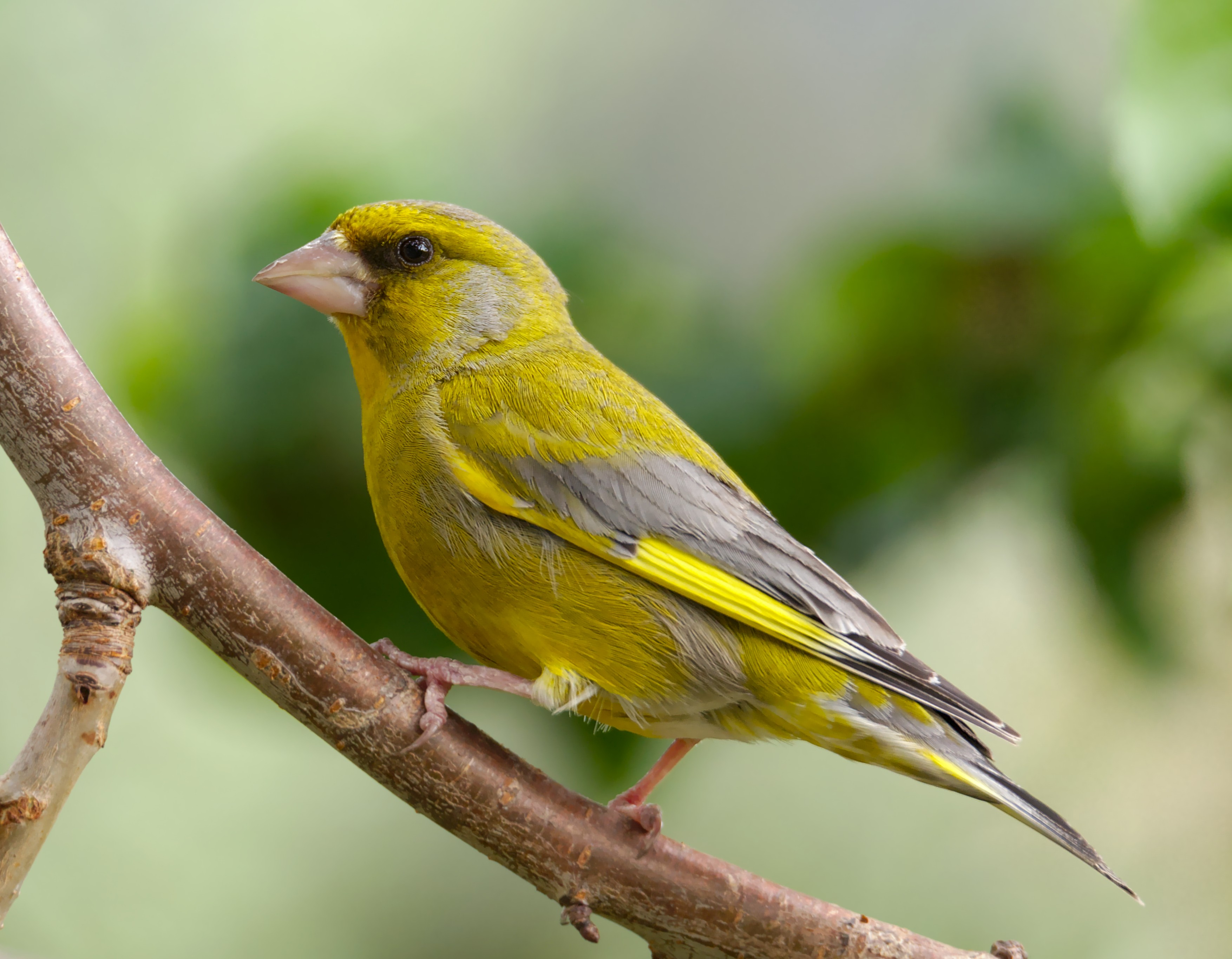
- male European greenfinch (Chloris chloris)

Scientific classification
- Kingdom: Animalia
- Phylum: Chordata
- Class: Aves
- Order: Passeriformes
- Family: Fringillidae
- Subfamily: Carduelinae
- Genus: Chloris; Cuvier, 1800

Type species
- Loxia chloris Linnaeus, 1758

Species
- See text

Synonyms
- Chloris Cuvier, 1800 (but see text); Chloris C.L.Brehm, 1856 (non Cuvier, 1800: preoccupied); Chloris A.E.Brehm, 1857 (non Cuvier, 1800: preoccupied)

= Greenfinch =

Genus of birds

The greenfinches are small passerine birds in the genus Chloris in the subfamily Carduelinae within the Fringillidae. The species have a Eurasian distribution except for the European greenfinch, which also occurs in North Africa.

These finches all have large conical bills and yellow patches on the wing feathers.

The greenfinches were formerly placed in the genus Carduelis. Molecular phylogenetic studies showed that the greenfinches form a monophyletic group that is not closely related to the species in Carduelis and instead is sister to a clade containing the desert finch (Rhodospiza obsoleta) and the Socotra golden-winged grosbeak (Rhynchostruthus socotranus). The greenfinches were therefore moved to the resurrected genus Chloris which had originally been introduced by the French naturalist Georges Cuvier in 1800 with the European greenfinch as the type species. The name is from Ancient Greek khloris, the European greenfinch, from khloros, "green".

== Extant species ==
The genus contains the following six species:

Image	Scientific name	Common name	Distribution
	Chloris ambigua	Black-headed greenfinch	Yunnan, northern Laos, eastern Myanmar and adjacent areas of Vietnam, Thailand and northeastern India
	Chloris chloris	European greenfinch	Europe, North Africa and Southwest Asia
	Chloris sinica	Oriental greenfinch	East Asia
	Chloris kittlitzi	Bonin greenfinch	The Ogasawara (Bonin) Islands
	Chloris monguilloti	Vietnamese greenfinch	southern Vietnam
	Chloris spinoides	Yellow-breasted greenfinch	Northern regions of the Indian subcontinent

== Fossil species ==
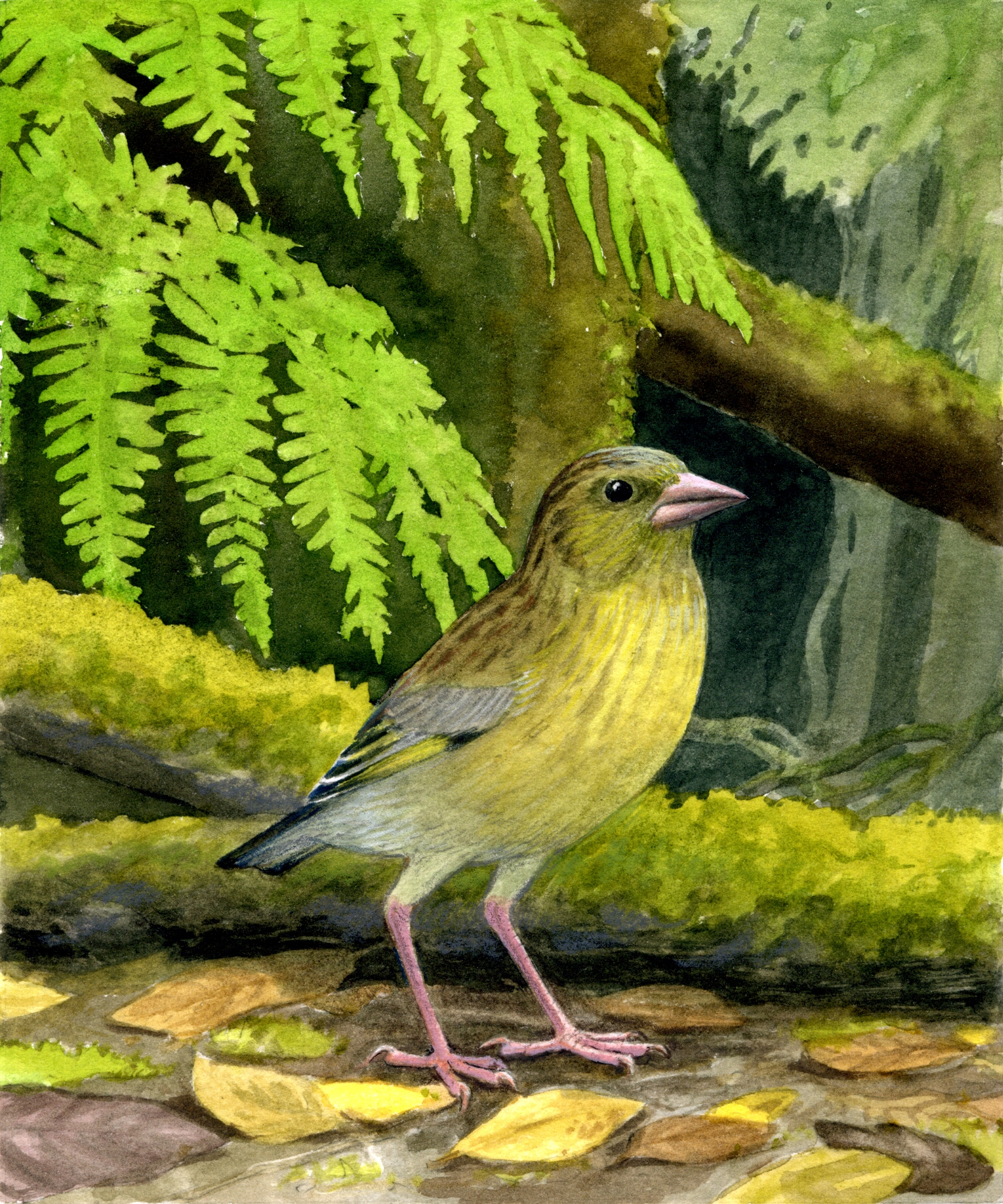
Restoration of the extinct Chloris aurelioi, described September 23, 2010

- Trias greenfinch (Chloris triasi) - Holocene of La Palma, the Canary Islands, Spain
- Slender-billed greenfinch (Chloris aurelioi) - Holocene of Tenerife, the Canary Islands, Spain
