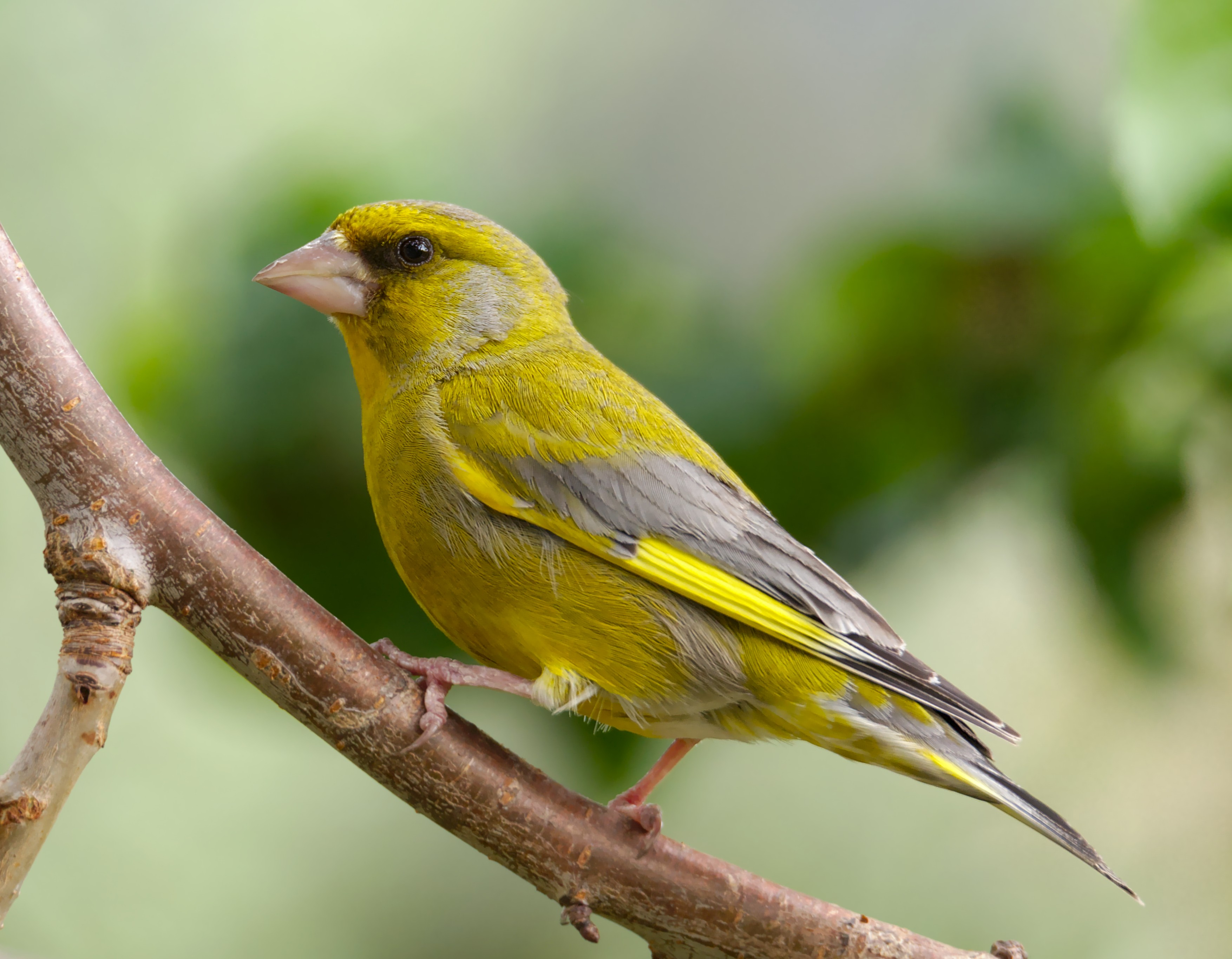
- Male nominate C. c. chloris in Jena, Germany

Conservation status
- Least Concern (IUCN 3.1)

Scientific classification
- Kingdom: Animalia
- Phylum: Chordata
- Class: Aves
- Order: Passeriformes
- Family: Fringillidae
- Subfamily: Carduelinae
- Genus: Chloris
- Species: C. chloris

Binomial name
- Chloris chloris (Linnaeus, 1758)
- Range of the European greenfinch (Chloris chloris) Breeding Resident Non-breeding Extant & Introduced (resident) Possible extinct & Introduced

Synonyms
- Loxia chloris Linnaeus, 1758; Carduelis chloris (Linnaeus, 1758); Ligurinus chloris (Linnaeus); Coccothraustes chloris Flem.

Audio

= European greenfinch =

European greenfinch Temporal range: Gelasian–present

Species of bird

The European greenfinch, or simply the greenfinch (Chloris chloris), is a small passerine bird in the finch family Fringillidae.

This songbird is widespread throughout Europe, North Africa and Southwest Asia. It is mainly resident, but some of the populations from the far north migrate further south. The greenfinch has also been introduced into Australia, New Zealand, Uruguay, and Argentina.

== Taxonomy ==
The greenfinch was described by Carl Linnaeus in his landmark 1758 10th edition of Systema Naturae under the binomial name Loxia chloris. The specific epithet is from khloris, the Ancient Greek name for this bird, from khloros, "green".

A molecular phylogenetic study published in 2012 found that the greenfinches are not closely related to other species of the genus Carduelis. They have therefore been placed in the resurrected genus Chloris, which was originally been introduced by the French naturalist Georges Cuvier in 1800. The European greenfinch is the type species of this genus.

=== Subspecies ===
There are 10 recognised subspecies.

Image	Name and describing authority	Range
	C. c. harrisoni Clancey, 1940	Great Britain (except northern Scotland) and Ireland
	C. c. chloris (Linnaeus, 1758)	Northern Scotland, northern and central France and Norway to western Siberia
	C. c. muehlei Parrot, 1905	Serbia and Montenegro to Moldova, Bulgaria, and Greece
	C. c. aurantiiventris (Cabanis, 1851)	Southern Spain through southern Europe to western Greece
	C. c. madaraszi Tschusi, 1911	Corsica and Sardinia
	C. c. vanmarli Voous, 1952	Northwestern Spain, Portugal and northwestern Morocco
	C. c. voousi (Roselaar, 1993)	Central Morocco and northern Algeria
	C. c. chlorotica (Bonaparte, 1850)	South-central Turkey to northeastern Egypt
	C. c. bilkevitchi Zarudny, 1911	Southern Ukraine, the Caucasus and northeastern Turkey to northern Iran and southwestern Turkmenistan
	C. c. turkestanica Zarudny, 1907	Southern Kazakhstan to Kyrgyzstan and central Tajikistan

== Description ==
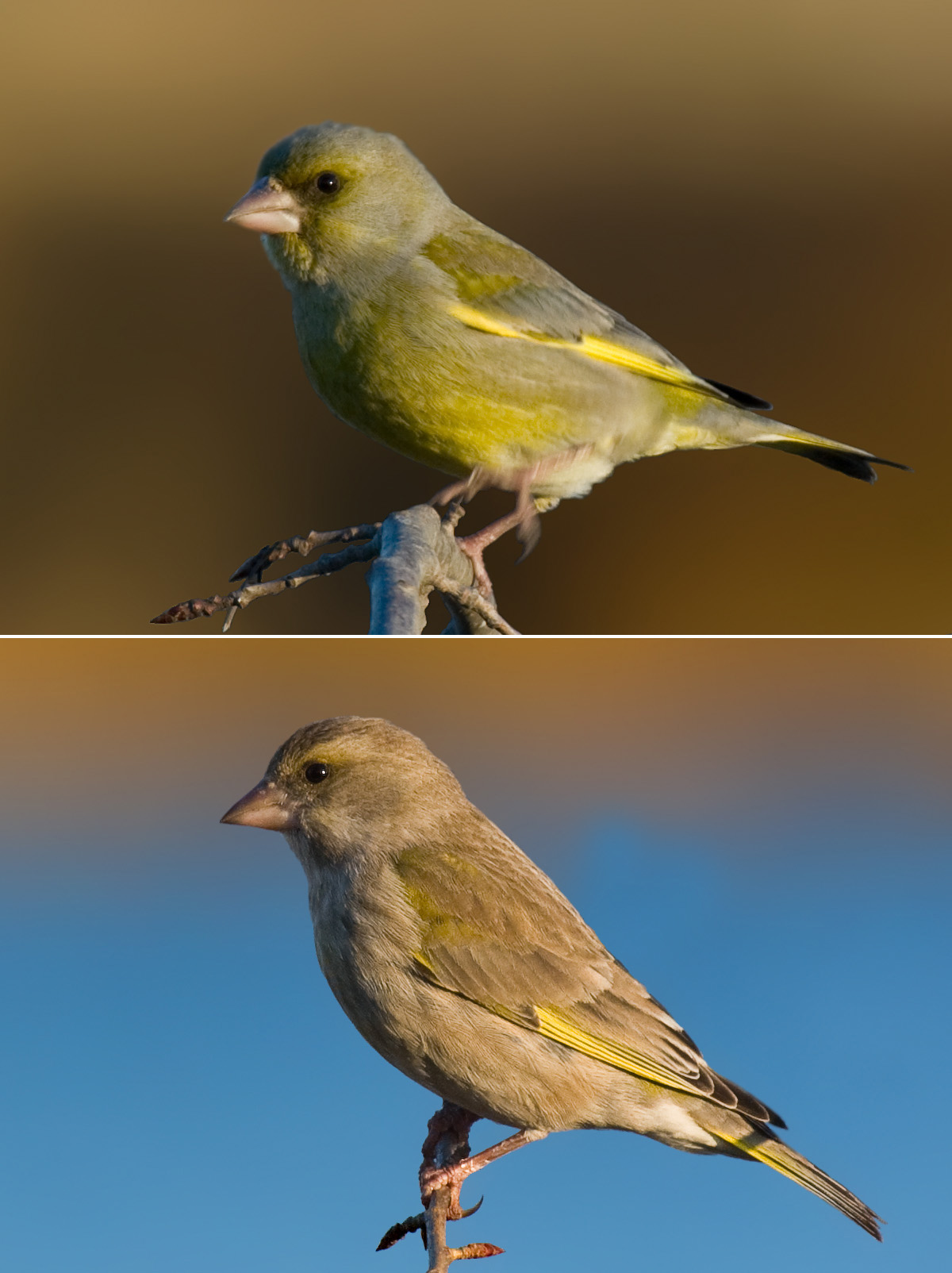
Comparison between a male (top) and a female (bottom) greenfinch

The European greenfinch is 15 cm (5.9 in) long with a wingspan of 24.5 to 27.5 cm (9.6 to 10.8 in). It is similar in size and shape to a house sparrow, but is mainly green, with yellow in the wings and tail. The female and young birds are duller and have brown tones on the back. The bill is thick and conical. The song contains a lot of trilling and twittering interspersed with wheezes, and the male performs a "butterfly" display flight. Male greenfinches exhibit higher degrees of fluctuating asymmetry. Their bones are more susceptible to disruption during development than those of females.

== Behaviour and ecology ==
=== Breeding ===
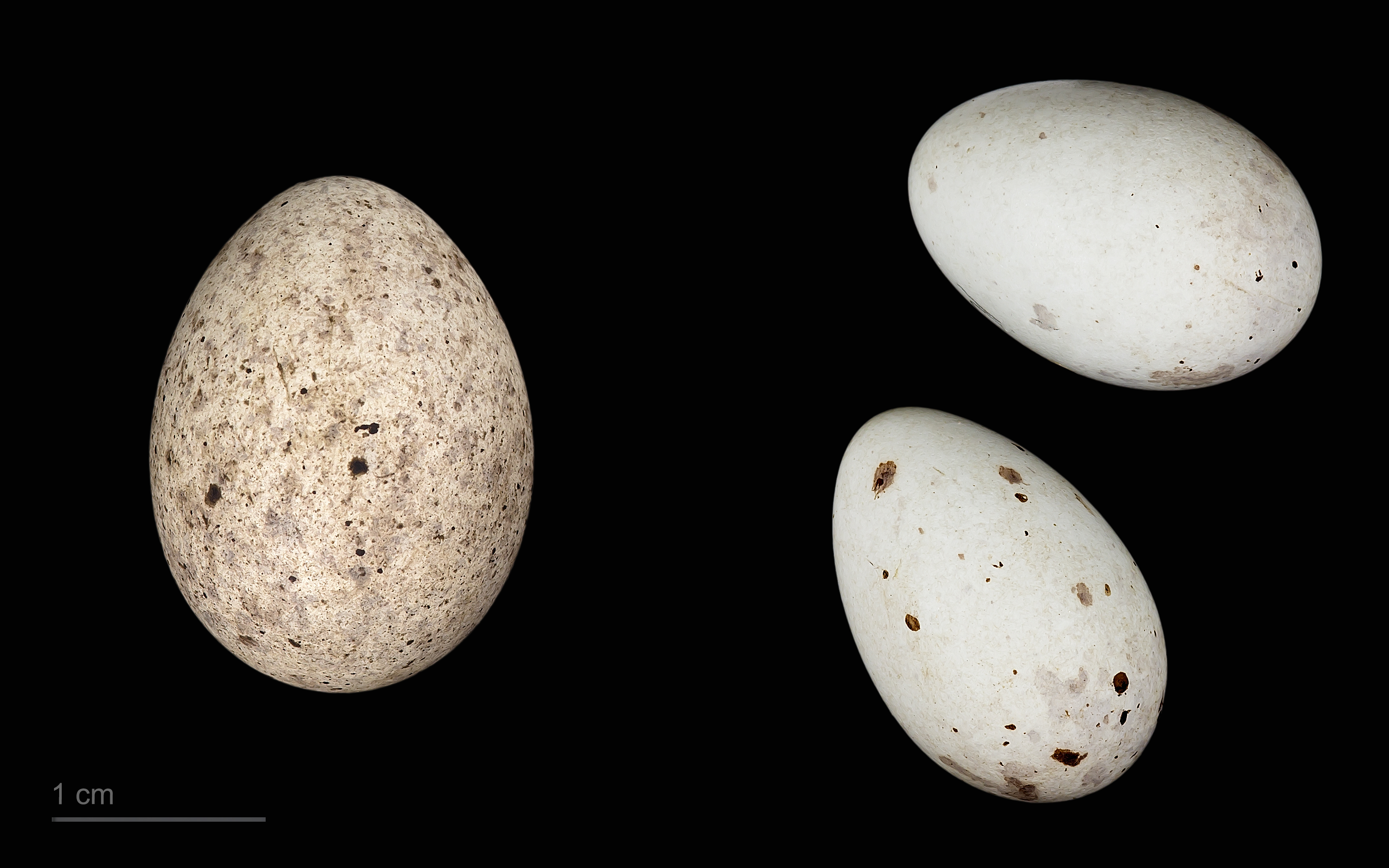
Cuculus canorus bangsi in a clutch of Carduelis chloris - MHNT

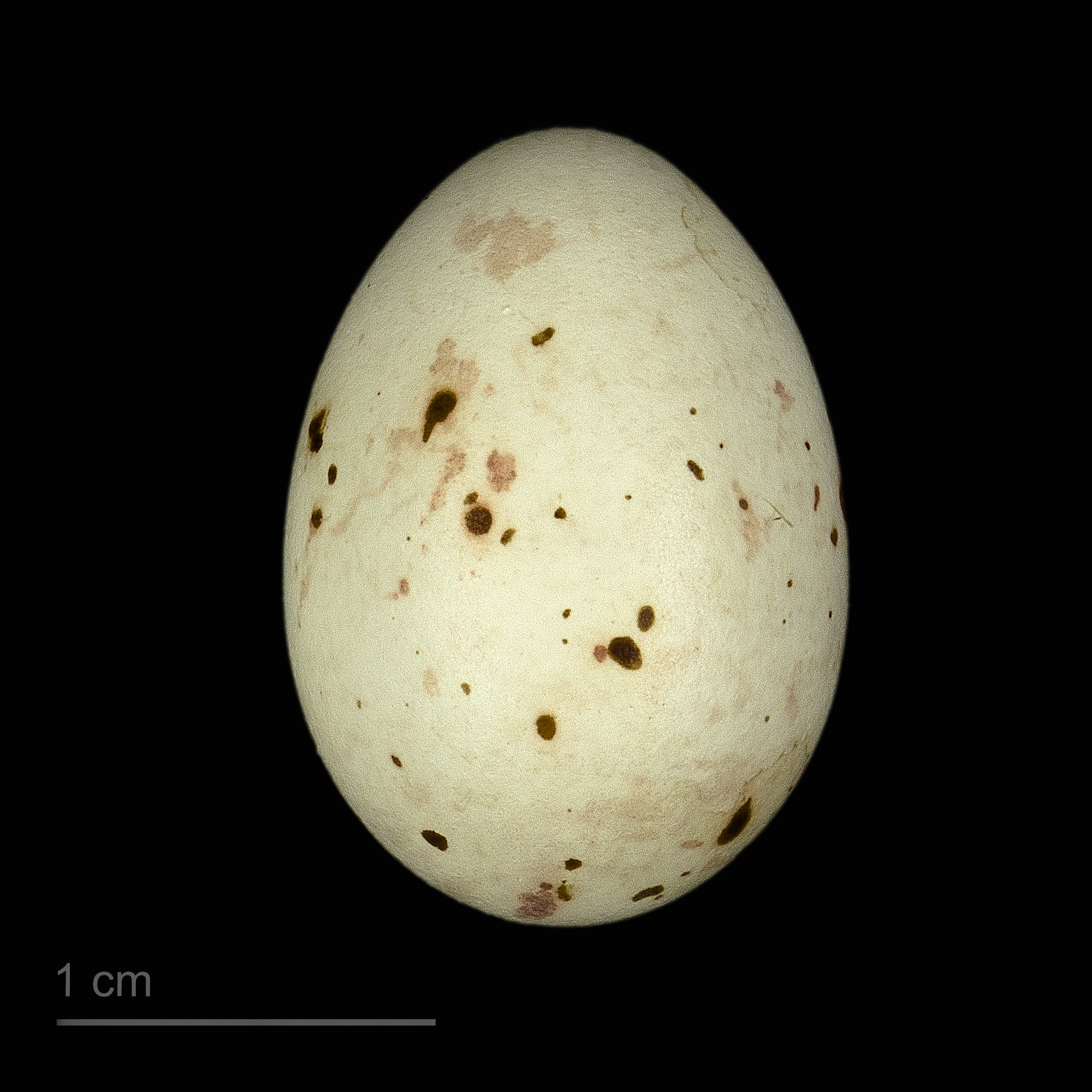
Chloris chloris aurantiiventris - MHNT

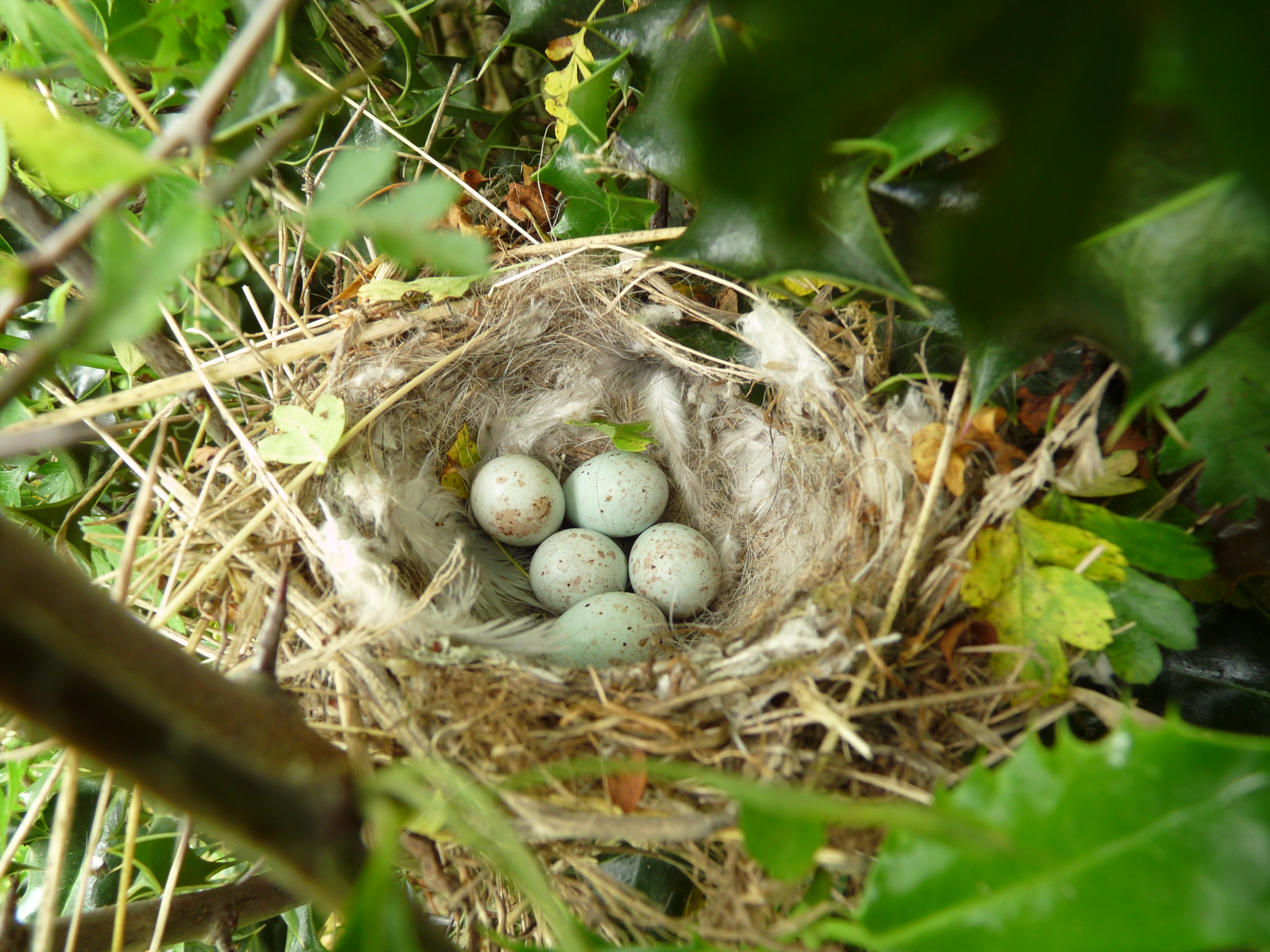
Nest with eggs in Nottinghamshire, England

The breeding season lasts from the second half of March until June; fledging takes place in early July. Woodland edges, farmland hedges and gardens with relatively thick vegetation are favoured for breeding. The nest is placed in trees or bushes. The nest is built by the female who is accompanied by the male. The clutch consists of 4–6 eggs which are typically laid at daily intervals, beginning one or two days after the nest is completed. The eggs are greyish-white, bluish-white, or beige, with reddish or brownish spots or blotches concentrated at the broader end. On average the eggs measure 20.0 mm × 14.6 mm (0.79 in × 0.57 in) and weigh 2.17 g (0.077 oz). They are incubated by the female for 13–14 days. During this period, the male feeds her at the nest. The chicks are covered in thick, long, greyish-white down when they hatch. Both adults feeds them on during the first days, and later on a frequently regurgitated yellowish paste made of seeds. They leave the nest after about 13 days, but cannot fly yet. They usually fledge 16–18 days after hatching. This species produces two or three broods per year.

In Australasia, the European greenfinch's breeding season is from October to March.

=== Food and feeding ===
The European greenfinch feeds on a great variety of seeds, berries, fruit, buds, flowers and some arthropods. It forages in trees and bushes, and also on the ground.

== Predators and parasites ==
The protozoal parasite Trichomonas gallinae is known to infect pigeons and raptors. However, beginning in Great Britain in 2005, carcasses of dead European greenfinches and common chaffinches were found to be infected with the parasite. The disease subsequently spread, with infected carcasses being found in Norway, Sweden and Finland in 2008 and in Germany the following year. It is believed that the spread of the disease was mediated by common chaffinches, given that large numbers of these birds breed in northern Europe and winter in Great Britain. In Great Britain, the number of infected carcasses recovered each year declined after peaking in 2006. The number of European greenfinches declined from around 4.3 million to around 2.8 million, but there was no significant change in the overall number of common chaffinches. A similar pattern occurred in Finland, where the number of European greenfinches declined after the arrival of the disease in 2008, but there was only a small change in the number of common chaffinches.

== In literature ==
The English poet William Wordsworth wrote a poem about this species entitled The Green Linnet in 1803.

== Sources ==
- Cramp, Stanley; et al., eds. (1994). "Carduelis chloris Greenfich". Handbook of the Birds of Europe the Middle East and North Africa. The Birds of the Western Palearctic. Vol. VIII: Crows to Finches. Oxford: Oxford University Press. pp. 548–569. ISBN 978-0-19-854679-5.
- Collar, N.J.; Newton, I.; Clement, P. (2010). "Family Fringillidae (Finches)". In del Hoyo, J.; Elliott, A.; Christie, D.A. (eds.). Handbook of the Birds of the World. Vol. 15: Weavers to New World Warblers. Barcelona, Spain: Lynx Edicions. pp. 440–617. ISBN 978-84-96553-68-2.
- Jobling, James A (2010). The Helm Dictionary of Scientific Bird Names. London: Christopher Helm. ISBN 978-1-4081-2501-4.
- Linnaeus, C. (1758). Systema naturae per regna tria naturae, secundum classes, ordines, genera, species, cum characteribus, differentiis, synonymis, locis. Tomus I. Editio decima, reformata (in Latin). Holmiae:Laurentii Salvii.
- Paynter, Raymond A. Jnr, ed. (1968). Check-list of Birds of the World Volume 14. Cambridge, Massachusetts: Museum of Comparative Zoology.
