= Mamo (disambiguation) =

Mamo is a common name for two species of extinct birds from Hawaii

Mamo may also refer to:

== Given names ==
- Mamo Clark (1914–1986), American actress and author
- Mamo Osanai (born 1970), Japanese golfer
- Mamo Wolde (1932–2002), Ethiopian runner

== Surnames ==
- Abel Mamo, Ethiopian footballer
- Alessio Mamo, Italian artist and photojournalist
- Anthony Mamo, Maltese politician
- Aster Mamo, Ethiopian politician
- Carlo Mamo, Maltese footballer
- Esti Mamo, Ethiopian-born Israeli model and actress
- Jake Mamo, Australian rugby league player
- Meskerem Mamo (born 1999), Ethiopian middle- and long-distance runner

== Other uses ==
- Mamo (song), Russia's entry in the 2009 Eurovision contest
- Mamo (Tibetan), one of the eight classes of gods and demons in Tibetan Buddhism
- MAMO Marseille Modulor, a contemporary art museum in Marseille
- A spiritual leader of the Kogi people
