= Mamo =

Common name for several species of bird

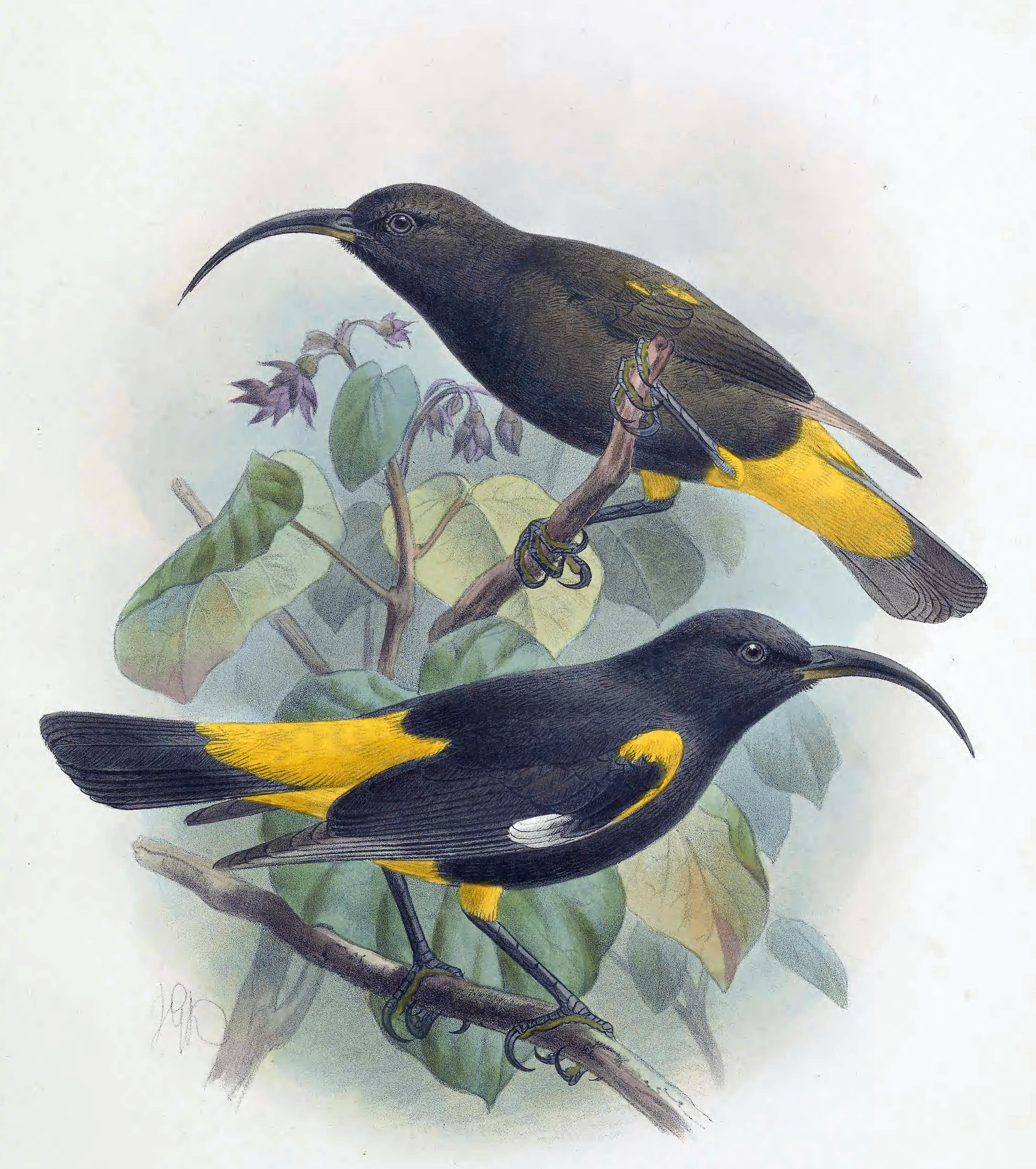
Hawai'i mamo (Drepanis pacifica)

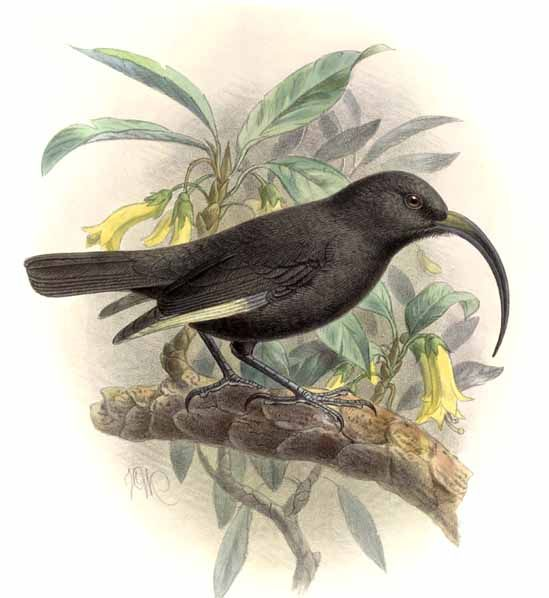
Black mamo (Drepanis funerea)

Mamo or woowoo is a common name for two species of extinct birds. Together with the extant ʻIʻiwi they make up the genus Drepanis. These nectarivorous finches were endemic to Hawaii but are now extinct.

The Hawaiian name may be related to the name of the ʻōʻō (Moho nobilis), a bird with a similar appearance. Another name for the mamo was ʻōʻō-nuku-umu, meaning "ʻōʻō with the sucking beak".

Two species are known.

== Hawaiʻi mamo ==
The Hawaiʻi mamo (Drepanis pacifica) was about 9 in (23 cm) in length. Its plumage was glossy black with yellow rumps and thigh feathers and a small yellow shoulder patch. The tail was black and there was a white basal primary patch and white shafts along the primaries. The bill was long, curved and black. Legs were dark gray or black.

This was a shy species that lived in the forest canopy and fed on the nectar of Lobelia species that possess curved, tubular flowers. Its call was a long, plaintive whistle.

The bright golden-yellow feathers of the Hawaiʻi mamo were prized for the featherwork worn by the aliʻi (Hawaiian royalty). The famous yellow cloak of Kamehameha I is estimated to have taken the reigns of eight monarchs and the golden feathers of 80,000 Hawaiʻi mamos before it was completed.

The Hawaiʻi mamo was last seen in 1899 near Kaūmana by a collector, H. W. Henshaw, who, as mentioned by Tim Flannery in his book, A Gap In Nature, shot and wounded a bird he was stalking, before it escaped him with another bird.

== Black mamo ==
The black mamo (Drepanis funerea) was about 8 in (20 cm) in length and appeared similar to the Hawaiʻi mamo but was entirely black except for the white primary shafts on the wings. The bill was more sharply decurved than the former species and had a small yellowy spot near the base (on the operculum).

When the bird fed the forehead would often become covered in pollen, making the forehead appear pale. The species fed on nectar from the flowers of Lobelia species and ʻōhiʻa lehua (Metrosideros polymorpha) at lower levels than the Hawaiʻi mamo. The bird was apparently curious and would approach observers. Its call was a clear flute-like whistle and a five or six note rollicking whistle.

The black mamo was endemic to Molokaʻi and was last observed in 1907 by the collector Alanson Bryan, who had shot three birds. Tim Flannery quoted him as having written, "To my joy I found the mangled remains hanging in the tree in a thick bunch of leaves, six feet or more beyond where it had been sitting."
