= Esti =

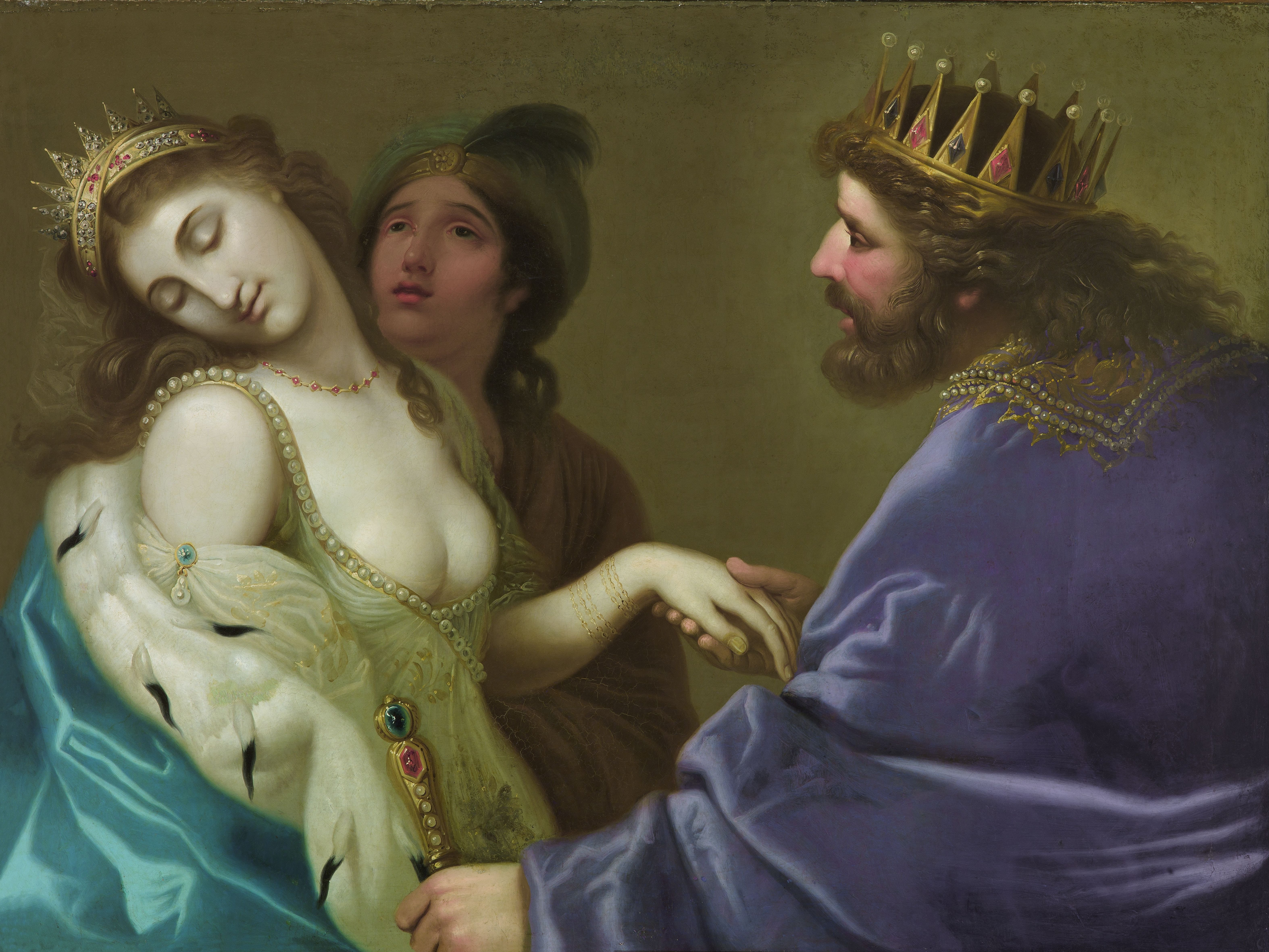
- Queen Esther before Ahasuerus by Franciszek Smuglewicz, 1778. The name Esti is often a diminutive of the name Esther.
- Pronunciation: /ˈɛstiː/ EST-ee
- Gender: Primarily female
- Language: Hebrew or Basque or Latin or Old Norse

Origin
- Meaning: Hebrew star or Basque honey or Latin summer or Old Norse from Estonia

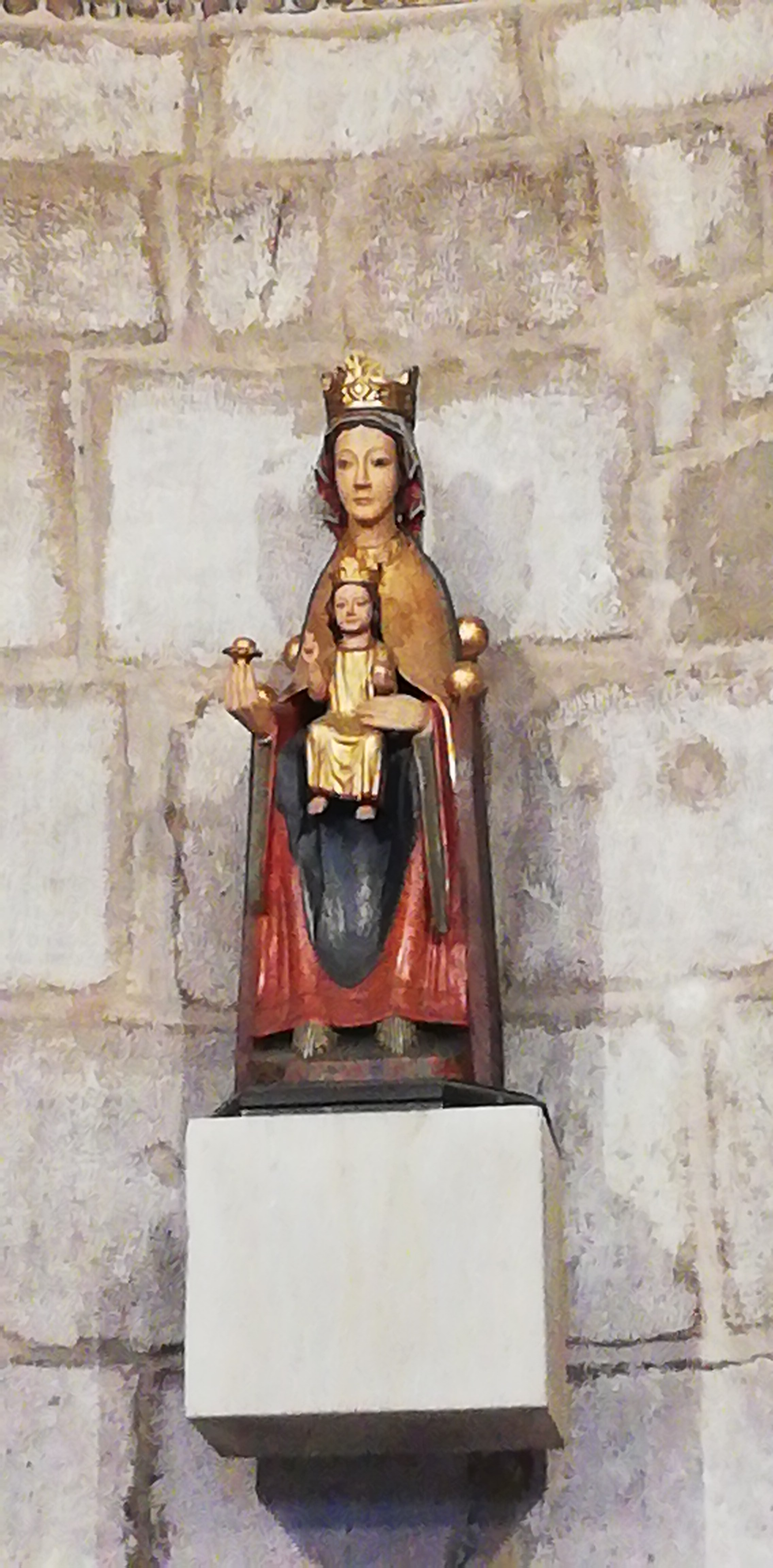
A statue of Our Lady of Estíbaliz, the patron saint of Álava. The name Esti is also used as a Basque and Spanish short form of the name Estíbaliz, given in reference to one of the devotional titles of the Virgin Mary used by Roman Catholics

Esti (/ˈɛstiː/) (EST-ee) is a primarily feminine given name.

Also spelled Estee or Estée, the name is a diminutive of the Hebrew name Esther. The name is often given in reference to the Biblical Esther in the Book of Esther. Esther and its diminutives are well used in Israel and elsewhere in the Jewish community. It is also in use in countries such as Finland as a short form of Ester. It is rarely used in the United States but could increase in usage for American girls after it was used in 2023 by John Legend and Chrissy Teigen for their daughter. Legend and Teigen were inspired to use the name after seeing the name Este on a hotel during a trip to Italy. Este, Veneto is located in the Province of Padua. They later learned the name Esti, in her case a derivative of Esther, had also belonged to Legend's great-grandmother.

The name is also said to be a Basque name with a folk etymology meaning of honey, derived from the Basque word ezti. It is used as a short form of the Basque Estibariz or the Spanish Estíbaliz or Estibaliz, all given in honor of Our Lady of Estíbaliz, one of many devotional titles for the Virgin Mary, the patron saint of Álava, a Spanish province and historic Basque territory. The popular meaning for the name is sweet like honey but other sources state that the place name Estíbaliz is derived from the Latin words Aestivalis or aestivus meaning summertime.

The name also has a history of use as a masculine name. It was an Old Danish form of the Old Norse name Æistr, meaning from Estonia, in use since the 1400s.

The etymologically unrelated Quebec French word esti or ostie, meaning host, is used as a profanity in Quebec when something unpleasant has occurred.

== People ==
- Estíbaliz "Esti" Gabilondo (born 1976), Spanish actress and journalist
- Esti Ginzburg (born 1990), Israeli model, actress and television host
- Esti Mamo (born 1983), Ethiopian-born Israeli fashion model and actress
- Dyah Roro Esti Widya Putri, commonly known as Esti (born 1993), Indonesian politician
- Esti Rosenberg (born 1965), American-Israeli Orthodox Rabbanit, founder and head of the Migdal Oz seminary
- Esti Almo Wexler, Ethiopian-Israeli film director, writer, and cinematographer

== Fictional characters ==
- Esther "Esti" Ben-David, a character in the Israeli television series Esti HaMekho'eret
