= 2019 Tour of the Basque Country =

Cycling race

2019 UCI World Tour, race 15 of 38

Race details
- Dates: 8–13 April 2019
- Stages: 6
- Distance: 783.7 km (487.0 mi)
- Winning time: 19h 24’ 09”

Results
Jersey awarded to the overall winner	Winner	Ion Izagirre (ESP)	(Astana)
	Second	Daniel Martin (IRL)	(UAE Team Emirates)
	Third	Emanuel Buchmann (GER)	(Bora–Hansgrohe)
Jersey awarded to the mountains classification winner	Mountains	Adam Yates (GBR)	(Mitchelton–Scott)
Jersey awarded to the young rider classification winner	Young rider	Tadej Pogačar (SLO)	(UAE Team Emirates)
Jersey awarded to the sprints classification winner	Sprints	Maximilian Schachmann (GER)	(Bora–Hansgrohe)

The 2019 Tour of the Basque Country was a road cycling stage race, that took place between 8 and 13 April 2019 in Spain. It was the 59th edition of Tour of the Basque Country and the 15th race of the 2019 UCI World Tour. Ion Izagirre of Spain was the winner.

== Participating teams ==
As the Tour of the Basque Country was a UCI World Tour event, all eighteen UCI WorldTeams were invited automatically and were obliged to enter a team in the race. Five UCI Professional Continental teams were awarded wildcard places, bringing the number of teams to twenty-three. As each team included seven riders, a total of 161 riders were due to start the first stage.

UCI WorldTeams

- AG2R La Mondiale
- Astana
- Bahrain–Merida
- Bora–Hansgrohe
- CCC Team
- Deceuninck–Quick-Step
- EF Education First
- Groupama–FDJ
- Team Katusha–Alpecin
- Lotto–Soudal
- Mitchelton–Scott
- Movistar Team
- Team Dimension Data
- Team Jumbo–Visma
- Team Sunweb
- Trek–Segafredo
- UAE Team Emirates
- Team Sky

UCI Professional Continental teams

- Burgos BH
- Caja Rural–Seguros RGA
- Cofidis
- Euskadi–Murias
- Team Manzana Postobón

== Route ==
The full route of the 2018 Tour of the Basque Country was announced on 27 February 2019.

Stage schedule
Stage	Date	Route	Distance	Type	Winner
1	8 April	Zumarraga to Zumarraga	11.2 km (7 mi)	Individual time trial	Maximilian Schachmann (GER)
2	9 April	Zumarraga to Gorraiz	149.5 km (93 mi)	Hilly stage	Julian Alaphilippe (FRA)
3	10 April	Sarriguren to Estibaliz	191.4 km (119 mi)	Hilly stage	Maximilian Schachmann (GER)
4	11 April	Vitoria-Gasteiz to Arrigorriaga	163.6 km (102 mi)	Medium-mountain stage	Maximilian Schachmann (GER)
5	12 April	Arrigorriaga to Arrate	149.8 km (93 mi)	Mountain stage	Emanuel Buchmann (GER)
6	13 April	Eibar to Eibar	118.2 km (73 mi)	Mountain stage	Adam Yates (GBR)

== Stages ==
=== Stage 1 ===
8 April 2019 — Zumarraga to Zumarraga, 11.2 km (7 mi), individual time trial (ITT)

Result of Stage 1
Rank	Rider	Team	Time
1	Maximilian Schachmann (GER)	Bora–Hansgrohe	17' 10"
2	Daniel Martínez (COL)	EF Education First	+ 9"
3	Michał Kwiatkowski (POL)	Team Sky	+ 10"
4	Julian Alaphilippe (FRA)	Deceuninck–Quick-Step	+ 12"
5	Adam Yates (GBR)	Mitchelton–Scott	+ 16"
6	Patrick Konrad (AUT)	Bora–Hansgrohe	+ 19"
7	Ion Izagirre (ESP)	Astana	+ 22"
8	Enric Mas (ESP)	Deceuninck–Quick-Step	+ 24"
9	Geraint Thomas (GBR)	Team Sky	+ 30"
10	Hugh Carthy (GBR)	EF Education First	+ 31"

General classification after Stage 1
Rank	Rider	Team	Time
1	Maximilian Schachmann (GER)	Bora–Hansgrohe	17' 10"
2	Daniel Martínez (COL)	EF Education First	+ 9"
3	Michał Kwiatkowski (POL)	Team Sky	+ 10"
4	Julian Alaphilippe (FRA)	Deceuninck–Quick-Step	+ 12"
5	Adam Yates (GBR)	Mitchelton–Scott	+ 16"
6	Patrick Konrad (AUT)	Bora–Hansgrohe	+ 19"
7	Ion Izagirre (ESP)	Astana	+ 22"
8	Enric Mas (ESP)	Deceuninck–Quick-Step	+ 24"
9	Geraint Thomas (GBR)	Team Sky	+ 30"
10	Hugh Carthy (GBR)	EF Education First	+ 31"

=== Stage 2 ===
9 April 2019 — Zumarraga to Gorraiz, 149.5 km (93 mi)

Result of Stage 2
Rank	Rider	Team	Time
1	Julian Alaphilippe (FRA)	Deceuninck–Quick-Step	3h 29' 37"
2	Bjorg Lambrecht (BEL)	Lotto–Soudal	+ 1"
3	Michał Kwiatkowski (POL)	Team Sky	+ 1"
4	Omar Fraile (ESP)	Astana	+ 1"
5	Valentin Madouas (FRA)	Groupama–FDJ	+ 1"
6	Maximilian Schachmann (GER)	Bora–Hansgrohe	+ 1"
7	Patrick Konrad (AUT)	Bora–Hansgrohe	+ 1"
8	Ion Izagirre (ESP)	Astana	+ 1"
9	Tadej Pogačar (SLO)	UAE Team Emirates	+ 1"
10	Pieter Serry (BEL)	Deceuninck–Quick-Step	+ 1"

General classification after Stage 2
Rank	Rider	Team	Time
1	Maximilian Schachmann (GER)	Bora–Hansgrohe	3h 46' 44"
2	Julian Alaphilippe (FRA)	Deceuninck–Quick-Step	+ 5"
3	Michał Kwiatkowski (POL)	Team Sky	+ 10"
4	Daniel Martínez (COL)	EF Education First	+ 18"
5	Patrick Konrad (AUT)	Bora–Hansgrohe	+ 23"
6	Ion Izagirre (ESP)	Astana	+ 23"
7	Enric Mas (ESP)	Deceuninck–Quick-Step	+ 28"
8	Dylan Teuns (BEL)	Bahrain–Merida	+ 36"
9	Daniel Martin (IRL)	UAE Team Emirates	+ 39"
10	Emanuel Buchmann (GER)	Bora–Hansgrohe	+ 41"

=== Stage 3 ===
10 April 2019 — Sarriguren to Estibaliz, 191.4 km (119 mi)

Result of Stage 3
Rank	Rider	Team	Time
1	Maximilian Schachmann (GER)	Bora–Hansgrohe	4h 47' 57"
2	Diego Ulissi (ITA)	UAE Team Emirates	+ 0"
3	Enrico Battaglin (ITA)	Team Katusha–Alpecin	+ 0"
4	Marc Hirschi (SUI)	Team Sunweb	+ 0"
5	Ion Izagirre (ESP)	Astana	+ 0"
6	Jon Aberasturi (ESP)	Caja Rural–Seguros RGA	+ 0"
7	Adam Yates (GBR)	Mitchelton–Scott	+ 0"
8	Bauke Mollema (NED)	Trek–Segafredo	+ 0"
9	Carlos Quintero (COL)	Team Manzana Postobón	+ 0"
10	Grega Bole (SLO)	Bahrain–Merida	+ 0"

General classification after Stage 3
Rank	Rider	Team	Time
1	Maximilian Schachmann (GER)	Bora–Hansgrohe	8h 34' 31"
2	Ion Izagirre (ESP)	Astana	+ 33"
3	Patrick Konrad (AUT)	Bora–Hansgrohe	+ 33"
4	Daniel Martínez (COL)	EF Education First	+ 48"
5	Daniel Martin (IRL)	UAE Team Emirates	+ 49"
6	Emanuel Buchmann (GER)	Bora–Hansgrohe	+ 51"
7	Pello Bilbao (ESP)	Astana	+ 54"
8	Dylan Teuns (BEL)	Bahrain–Merida	+ 1' 11"
9	Mikel Landa (ESP)	Movistar Team	+ 1' 16"
10	Sam Oomen (NED)	Team Sunweb	+ 1' 16"

=== Stage 4 ===
11 April 2019 — Vitoria-Gasteiz to Arrigorriaga, 163.6 km (102 mi)

Result of Stage 4
Rank	Rider	Team	Time
1	Maximilian Schachmann (GER)	Bora–Hansgrohe	4h 03' 55"
2	Tadej Pogačar (SLO)	UAE Team Emirates	+ 0"
3	Jakob Fuglsang (DEN)	Astana	+ 1"
4	Adam Yates (GBR)	Mitchelton–Scott	+ 1"
5	Marc Hirschi (SUI)	Team Sunweb	+ 9"
6	Emanuel Buchmann (GER)	Bora–Hansgrohe	+ 9"
7	Patrick Konrad (AUT)	Bora–Hansgrohe	+ 9"
8	Ion Izagirre (ESP)	Astana	+ 9"
9	Valentin Madouas (FRA)	Groupama–FDJ	+ 9"
10	Bjorg Lambrecht (BEL)	Lotto–Soudal	+ 9"

General classification after Stage 4
Rank	Rider	Team	Time
1	Maximilian Schachmann (GER)	Bora–Hansgrohe	12h 38' 16"
2	Patrick Konrad (AUT)	Bora–Hansgrohe	+ 51"
3	Ion Izagirre (ESP)	Astana	+ 52"
4	Daniel Martínez (COL)	EF Education First	+ 1' 07"
5	Daniel Martin (IRL)	UAE Team Emirates	+ 1' 08"
6	Emanuel Buchmann (GER)	Bora–Hansgrohe	+ 1' 10"
7	Jakob Fuglsang (DEN)	Astana	+ 1' 24"
8	Dylan Teuns (BEL)	Bahrain–Merida	+ 1' 30"
9	Mikel Landa (ESP)	Movistar Team	+ 1' 35"
10	Mikel Nieve (ESP)	Mitchelton–Scott	+ 1' 38"

=== Stage 5 ===
12 April 2019 — Arrigorriaga to Arrate, 149.8 km (93 mi)

Result of Stage 5
Rank	Rider	Team	Time
1	Emanuel Buchmann (GER)	Bora–Hansgrohe	3h 44' 14"
2	Ion Izagirre (ESP)	Astana	+ 1' 08"
3	Adam Yates (GBR)	Mitchelton–Scott	+ 1' 08"
4	Jakob Fuglsang (DEN)	Astana	+ 1' 08"
5	Tadej Pogačar (SLO)	UAE Team Emirates	+ 1' 24"
6	Daniel Martin (IRL)	UAE Team Emirates	+ 1' 24"
7	Mikel Landa (ESP)	Movistar Team	+ 1' 50"
8	Lucas Hamilton (AUS)	Mitchelton–Scott	+ 2' 04"
9	Maximilian Schachmann (GER)	Bora–Hansgrohe	+ 2' 04"
10	Patrick Konrad (AUT)	Bora–Hansgrohe	+ 2' 04"

General classification after Stage 5
Rank	Rider	Team	Time
1	Emanuel Buchmann (GER)	Bora–Hansgrohe	16h 23' 30"
2	Ion Izagirre (ESP)	Astana	+ 54"
3	Maximilian Schachmann (GER)	Bora–Hansgrohe	+ 1' 04"
4	Daniel Martin (IRL)	UAE Team Emirates	+ 1' 32"
5	Jakob Fuglsang (DEN)	Astana	+ 1' 32"
6	Patrick Konrad (AUT)	Bora–Hansgrohe	+ 1' 55"
7	Adam Yates (GBR)	Mitchelton–Scott	+ 1' 56"
8	Daniel Martínez (COL)	EF Education First	+ 2' 11"
9	Mikel Landa (ESP)	Movistar Team	+ 2' 25"
10	Tadej Pogačar (SLO)	UAE Team Emirates	+ 2' 25"

=== Stage 6 ===
13 April 2019 — Eibar to Eibar–Arrate, 118.2 km (73 mi)

Result of Stage 6
Rank	Rider	Team	Time
1	Adam Yates (GBR)	Mitchelton–Scott	2h 59' 46"
2	Daniel Martin (IRL)	UAE Team Emirates	+ 1"
3	Jakob Fuglsang (DEN)	Astana	+ 1"
4	Ion Izagirre (ESP)	Astana	+ 1"
5	Tadej Pogačar (SLO)	UAE Team Emirates	+ 27"
6	Bauke Mollema (NED)	Trek–Segafredo	+ 1' 24"
7	Mikel Landa (ESP)	Movistar Team	+ 1' 24"
8	Hugh Carthy (GBR)	EF Education First	+ 1' 24”
9	David Gaudu (FRA)	Groupama–FDJ	+ 1' 24"
10	Lucas Hamilton (AUS)	Mitchelton–Scott	+ 1' 24"

General classification after Stage 5
Rank	Rider	Team	Time
1	Ion Izagirre (ESP)	Astana	19h 24' 09"
2	Daniel Martin (IRL)	UAE Team Emirates	+ 29"
3	Emanuel Buchmann (GER)	Bora–Hansgrohe	+ 31"
4	Jakob Fuglsang (DEN)	Astana	+ 36"
5	Adam Yates (GBR)	Mitchelton–Scott	+ 51"
6	Tadej Pogačar (SLO)	UAE Team Emirates	+ 1' 56"
7	Mikel Landa (ESP)	Movistar Team	+ 2' 56"
8	Mikel Nieve (ESP)	Mitchelton–Scott	+ 3' 25"
9	Patrick Konrad (AUT)	Bora–Hansgrohe	+ 3' 29"
10	Maximilian Schachmann (GER)	Bora–Hansgrohe	+ 3' 44"

== Classification leadership table ==
Stage	Winner	General classification	Points classification	Mountains classification	Young rider classification
1	Maximilian Schachmann	Maximilian Schachmann	Maximilian Schachmann	Daniel Martínez	Maximilian Schachmann
2	Julian Alaphilippe	Maximilian Schachmann	Maximilian Schachmann	Garikoitz Bravo	Maximilian Schachmann
3	Maximilian Schachmann	Maximilian Schachmann	Maximilian Schachmann	Garikoitz Bravo	Maximilian Schachmann
4	Maximilian Schachmann	Maximilian Schachmann	Maximilian Schachmann	Garikoitz Bravo	Maximilian Schachmann
5	Emanuel Buchmann	Emanuel Buchmann	Maximilian Schachmann	Alessandro De Marchi	Maximilian Schachmann
6	Adam Yates	Ion Izagirre	Maximilian Schachmann	Adam Yates	Tadej Pogačar
Final		Ion Izagirre	Maximilian Schachmann	Adam Yates	Tadej Pogačar

== Final classification standings ==
Legend
Denotes the winner of the general classification	Denotes the winner of the mountains classification
Denotes the winner of the points classification	Denotes the winner of the young rider classification

=== General classification ===
Final general classification
Rank	Rider	Team	Time
1	Ion Izagirre (ESP)	Astana	19h 24' 09"
2	Daniel Martin (IRL)	UAE Team Emirates	+ 29"
3	Emanuel Buchmann (GER)	Bora–Hansgrohe	+ 31"
4	Jakob Fuglsang (DEN)	Astana	+ 36"
5	Adam Yates (GBR)	Mitchelton–Scott	+ 51"
6	Tadej Pogačar (SLO)	UAE Team Emirates	+ 1' 36"
7	Mikel Landa (ESP)	Movistar Team	+ 2' 56"
8	Mikel Nieve (ESP)	Mitchelton–Scott	+ 3' 13"
9	Patrick Konrad (AUT)	Bora–Hansgrohe	+ 3' 29"
10	Maximilian Schachmann (GER)	Bora–Hansgrohe	+ 3' 44"

=== Points classification ===
Final points classification
Rank	Rider	Team	Points
1	Maximilian Schachmann (GER)	Bora–Hansgrohe	96
2	Adam Yates (GBR)	Mitchelton–Scott	78
3	Ion Izagirre (ESP)	Astana	76
4	Tadej Pogačar (SLO)	UAE Team Emirates	54
5	Jakob Fuglsang (DEN)	Astana	50
6	Emanuel Buchmann (GER)	Bora–Hansgrohe	40
7	Daniel Martin (IRL)	UAE Team Emirates	39
8	Patrick Konrad (AUT)	Bora–Hansgrohe	35
9	Mikel Landa (ESP)	Movistar Team	27
10	Bauke Mollema (NED)	Trek–Segafredo	27

=== Mountains classification ===
Final mountains classification
Rank	Rider	Team	Points
1	Adam Yates (GBR)	Mitchelton–Scott	34
2	Alessandro De Marchi (ITA)	CCC Team	30
3	Ion Izagirre (ESP)	Astana	29
4	Jakob Fuglsang (DEN)	Astana	24
5	Emanuel Buchmann (GER)	Bora–Hansgrohe	15
6	Tadej Pogačar (SLO)	UAE Team Emirates	15
7	Carlos Verona (ESP)	Movistar Team	13
8	Luis León Sánchez (ESP)	Astana	12
9	Julien Bernard (FRA)	Trek–Segafredo	12
10	Garikoitz Bravo (ESP)	Euskadi–Murias	12

=== Young rider classification ===
Final young rider classification
Rank	Rider	Team	Time
1	Tadej Pogačar (SLO)	UAE Team Emirates	19h 25' 45"
2	Maximilian Schachmann (GER)	Bora–Hansgrohe	+ 2' 08"
3	Enric Mas (ESP)	Deceuninck–Quick-Step	+ 2' 39"
4	Hugh Carthy (GBR)	EF Education First	+ 3' 49"
5	Lucas Hamilton (AUS)	Mitchelton–Scott	+ 5' 07"
6	Valentin Madouas (FRA)	Groupama–FDJ	+ 5' 30"
7	David Gaudu (FRA)	Groupama–FDJ	+ 7' 27"
8	Bjorg Lambrecht (BEL)	Lotto–Soudal	+ 10' 07"
9	Daniel Martínez (COL)	EF Education First	+ 14' 20"
10	Jonas Vingegaard (DEN)	Team Jumbo–Visma	+ 28' 54"
