= Estee =

Estee is a feminine given name, a diminutive of the name Esther, and a surname.

Estee may refer to:

== People and characters ==
- Estee (given name), and a list of persons and characters with that given name
- Morris M. Estee (1833–1903), American Republican lawyer, politician, and judge from California
- D. M. Estee, a 19th-century notable from Canisteo, New York, U.S.A.
- Perry H. Estee, a 19th-century notable in Coe Township, Michigan, U.S.A.

=== Characters ===
- Alice Estee, a fictional character from the 1975 film The Day of the Locust (film)
- Claude Estee, a fictional character from the 1939 novel The Day of the Locust

== Other uses ==
- Earth Space Technical Ecosystem Enterprises (ESTEE), a space advocacy group headed by Omar Fayed

== See also ==
- Estée Lauder Companies
- Esti (given name)
- Este (disambiguation)
- Estey (disambiguation)
- Esty (disambiguation)
- Est (disambiguation)
