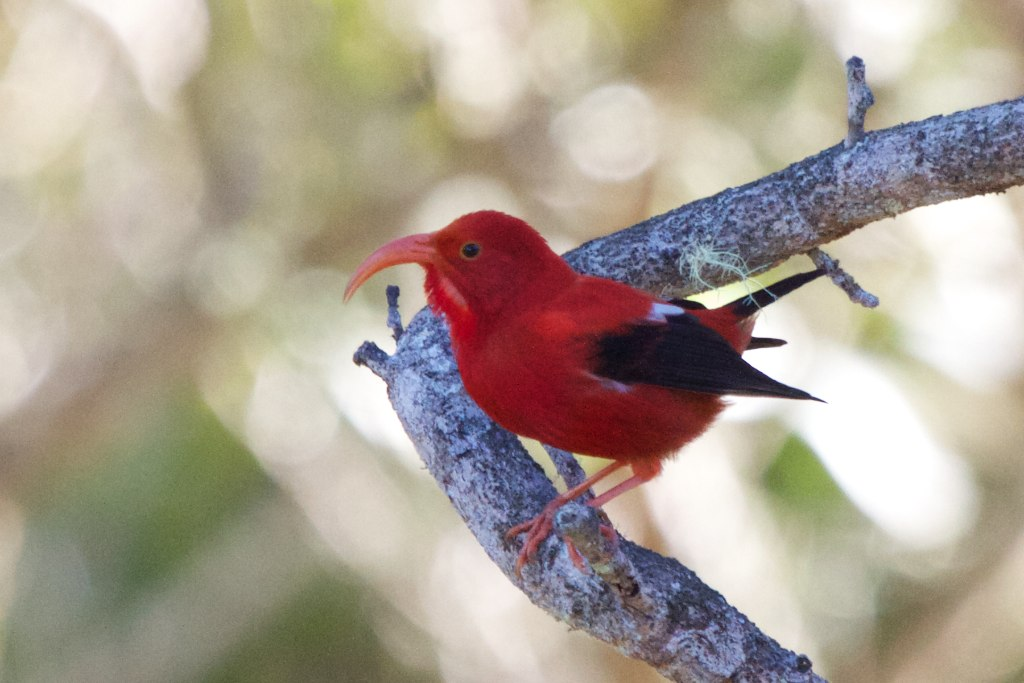
- Adult in Hawaii

Conservation status
- Vulnerable (IUCN 3.1)

Scientific classification
- Kingdom: Animalia
- Phylum: Chordata
- Class: Aves
- Order: Passeriformes
- Family: Fringillidae
- Subfamily: Carduelinae
- Genus: Drepanis
- Species: D. coccinea

Binomial name
- Drepanis coccinea (Forster, 1780)
- The distribution of ʻIʻiwi (green) with extinct areas (red)

Synonyms
- Vestiaria coccinea

= ʻIʻiwi =

Species of bird

The ʻiʻiwi (pronounced /iː.ˈiː.wiː/, ee-EE-wee or /iː.ˈiː.viː/, ee-EE-vee) or scarlet honeycreeper (Drepanis coccinea) is a species of Hawaiian honeycreeper. The ʻiʻiwi is a highly recognizable symbol of Hawaii.

== Etymology ==
Linguists derive the Hawaiian language word ʻiʻiwi from Proto-Nuclear-Polynesian *kiwi, which in central Polynesia refers to the bristle-thighed curlew (Numenius tahitiensis), a migratory bird. The long decurved bill of the curlew somewhat resembles that of the ʻiʻiwi.

== Taxonomy ==
The ʻiʻiwi was historically placed in its own genus Vestiaria, but many recent authorities regard it as a member of the genus Drepanis, also including the now extinct elongate billed Hawaii mamo and black mamo. However, this has been questioned based on genetic evidence, with genomic studies finding the ʻiʻiwi to be more closely related to the recently extinct Laysan honeycreeper and still living ʻAkohekohe and ʻApapane than to the two mamo species.

== Description ==
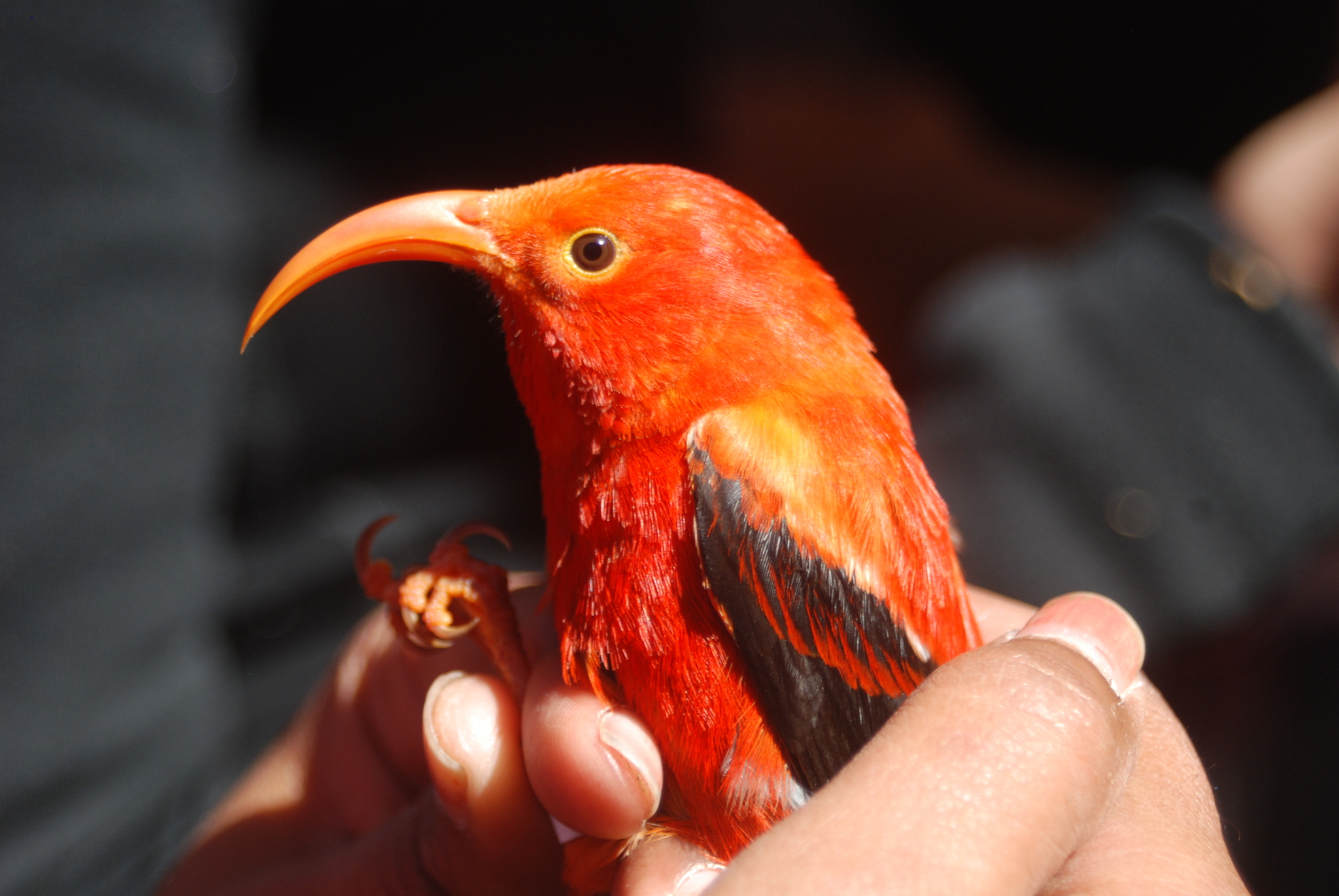
Closeup

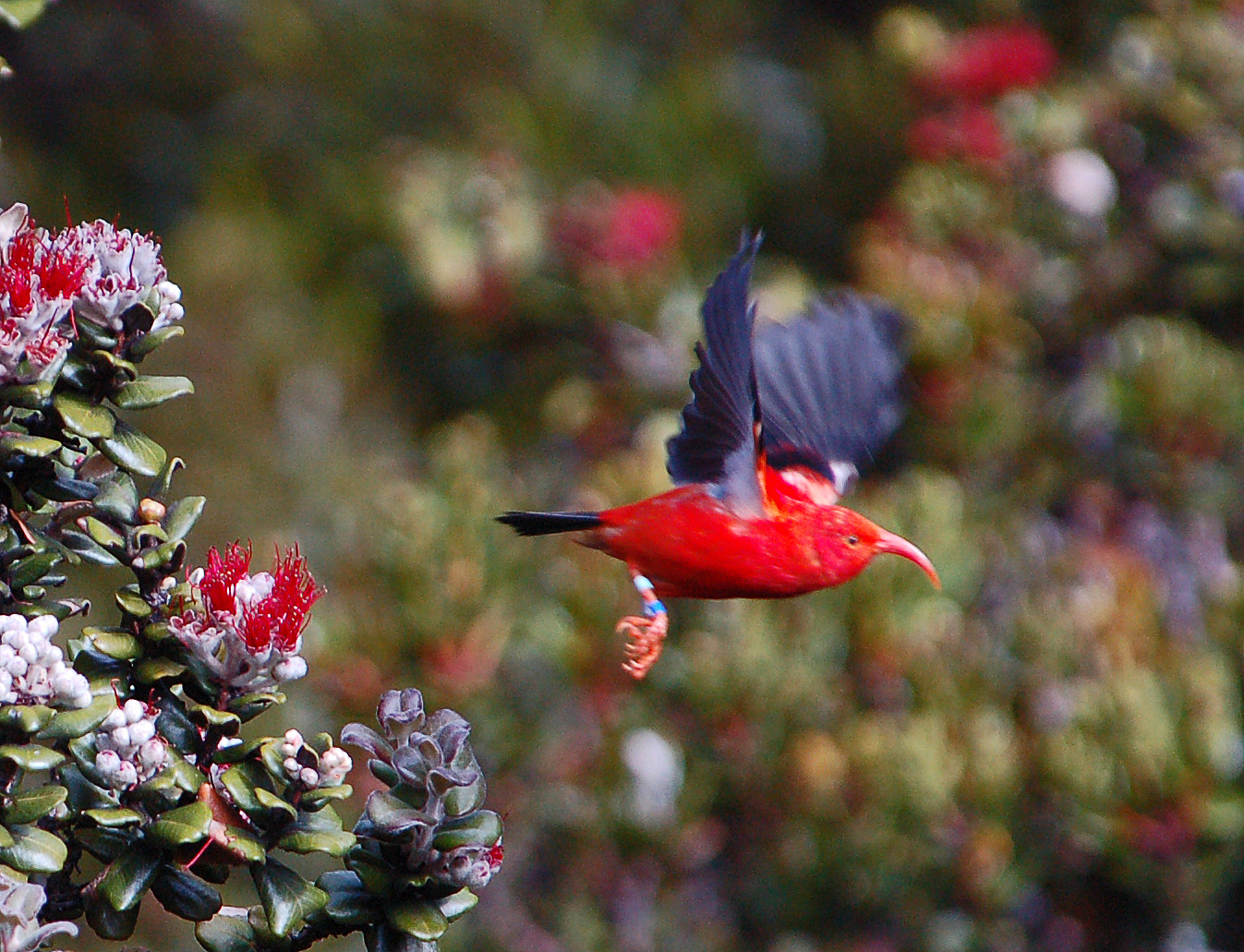
ʻIʻiwi in flight demonstrates its vivid colors

The adult ʻiʻiwi is mostly scarlet, with black wings and tail and a long, curved, salmon-colored bill used primarily for drinking nectar. The contrast of the red and black plumage with surrounding green foliage makes the ʻiʻiwi one of Hawaiʻi's most easily seen native birds. Younger birds have golden plumage with more spots and ivory bills and were mistaken for a different species by early naturalists. Observations of young birds moulting into adult plumage resolved this confusion.

Along with the Hawaiʻi Mamo, ʻiʻiwi were used in the feather trade. The ʻiʻiwi's feathers were highly prized by Hawaiian aliʻi (nobility) for use in decorating ʻahuʻula (feather cloaks) and mahiole (feathered helmets), and such uses gave the species its original scientific name: Vestiaria, which comes from the Latin for "clothing", and coccinea meaning "scarlet-colored". (In 2015 the IOC World Bird List moved the ʻiʻiwi from genus Vestiaria to Drepanis because of the close relationship between the ʻiʻiwi and the two species of mamo; Drepanis comes from the Greek for sickle, a reference to the shape of the beak.)

The bird is often mentioned in Hawaiian folklore. The Hawaiian song "Sweet Lei Mamo" includes the line "The ʻiʻiwi bird, too, is a friend".

=== Songs ===
The ʻiʻiwi has a complex and varied song, which has been compared to the sound of whistles, balls dropping in water, the rubbing of balloons together, and the squeaking of a rusty hinge. Both sexes have been observed to mimic other bird calls.

=== Diet ===
The long bill of the ʻiʻiwi assists it to extract nectar from the flowers of the Hawaiian lobelioids, which have decurved corollas. Starting in 1902 the lobelioid population declined dramatically, and the ʻiʻiwi shifted to nectar from the blossoms of ʻōhiʻa lehua (Metrosideros polymorpha) trees. ʻIʻiwi also eat small arthropods.

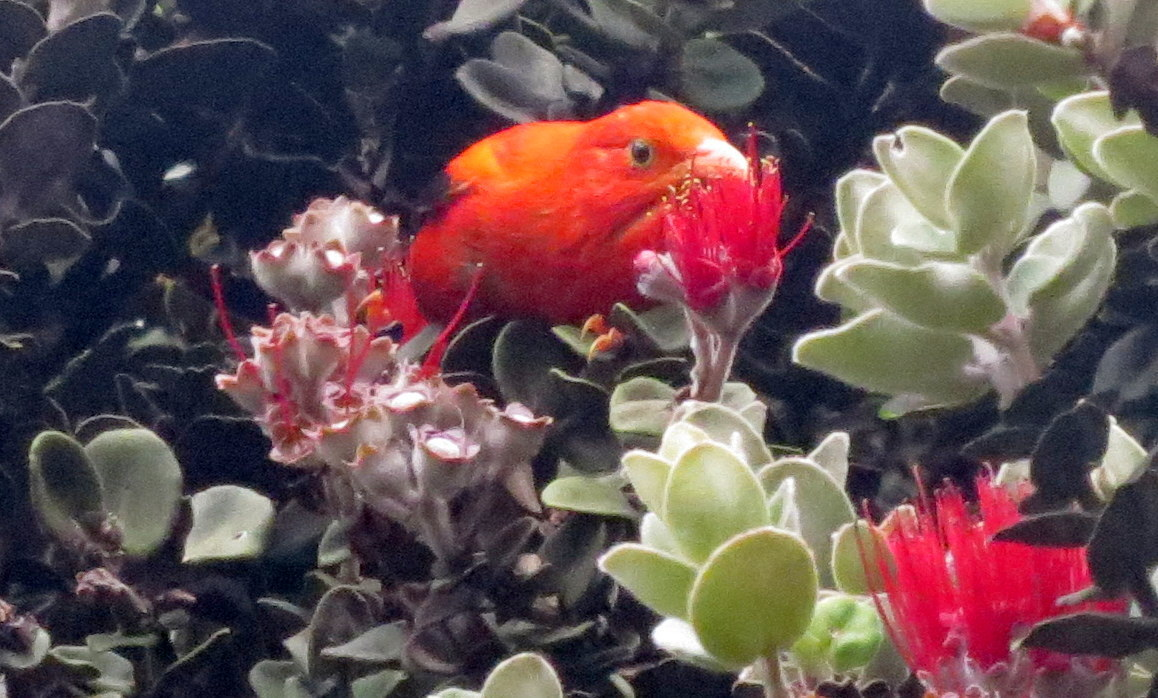
Feeding on ʻōhiʻa lehua

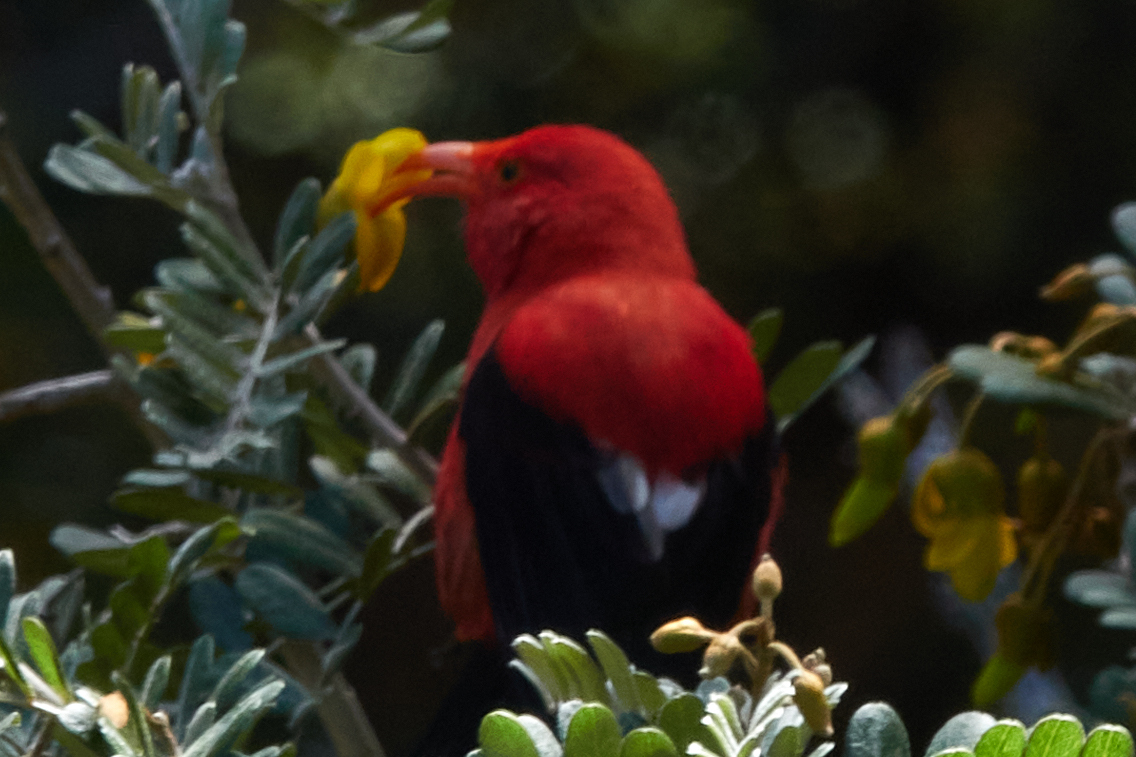
Feeding on māmane

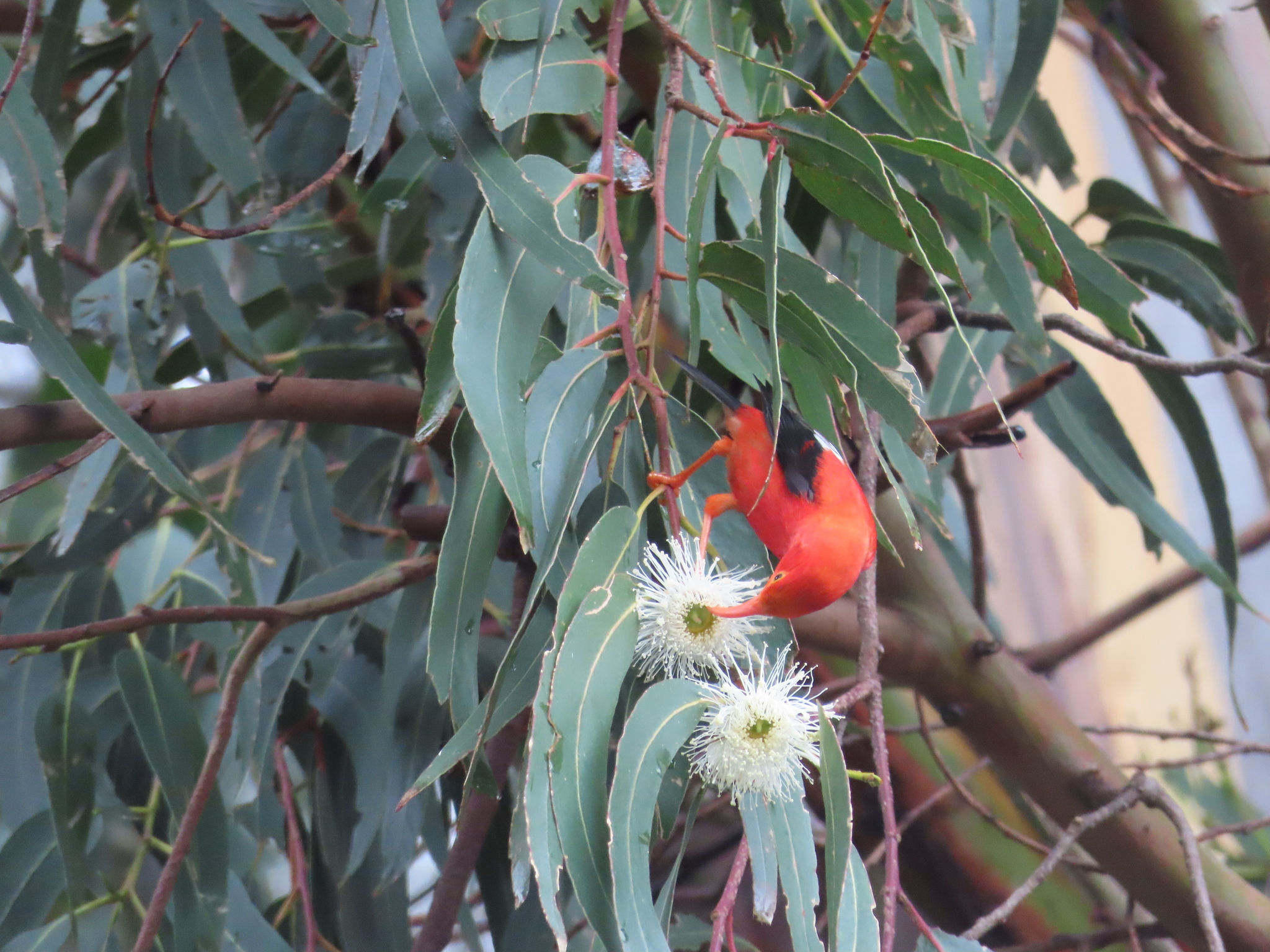
Feeding on Angophora

=== Breeding ===
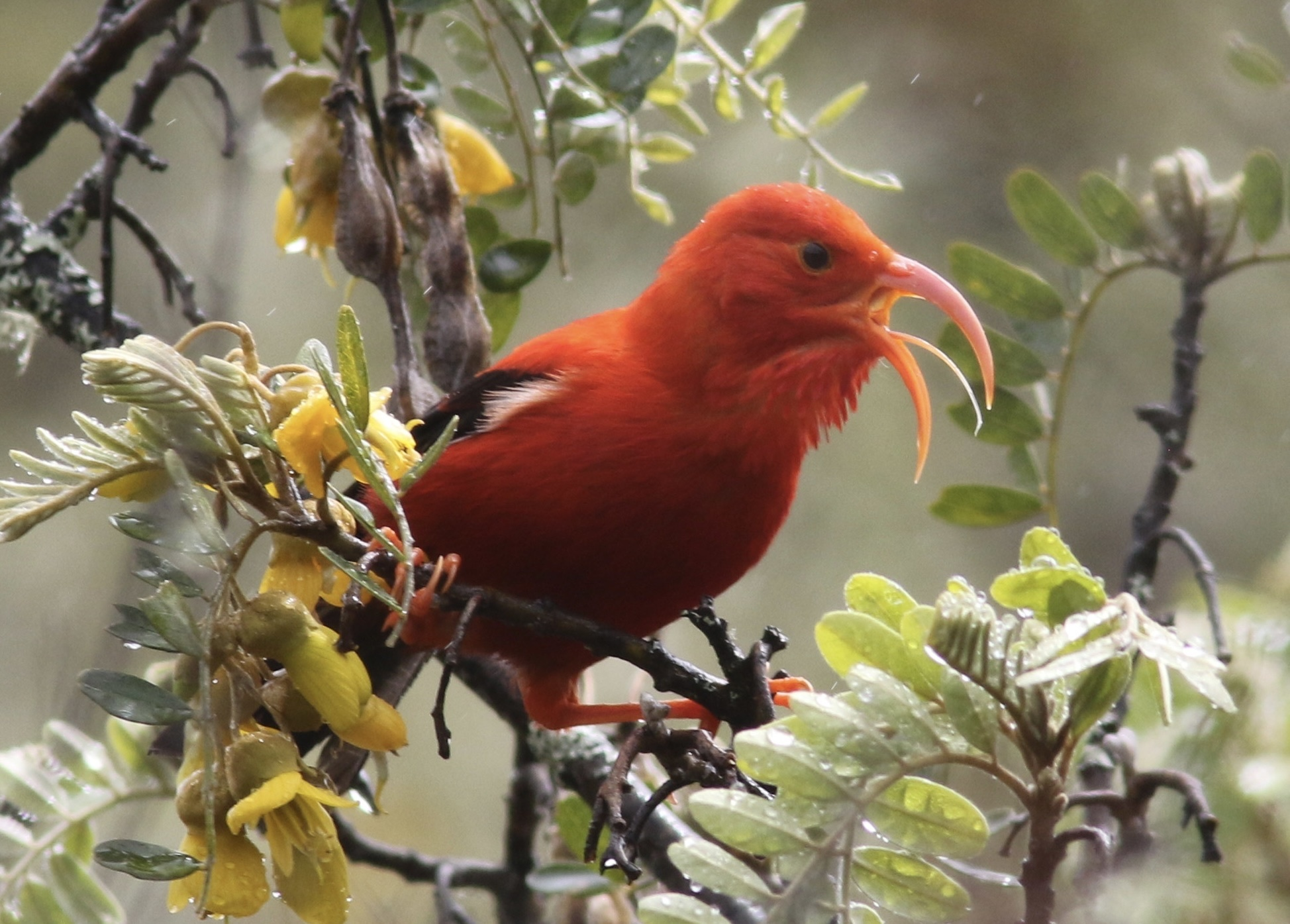
Adult, showing tongue

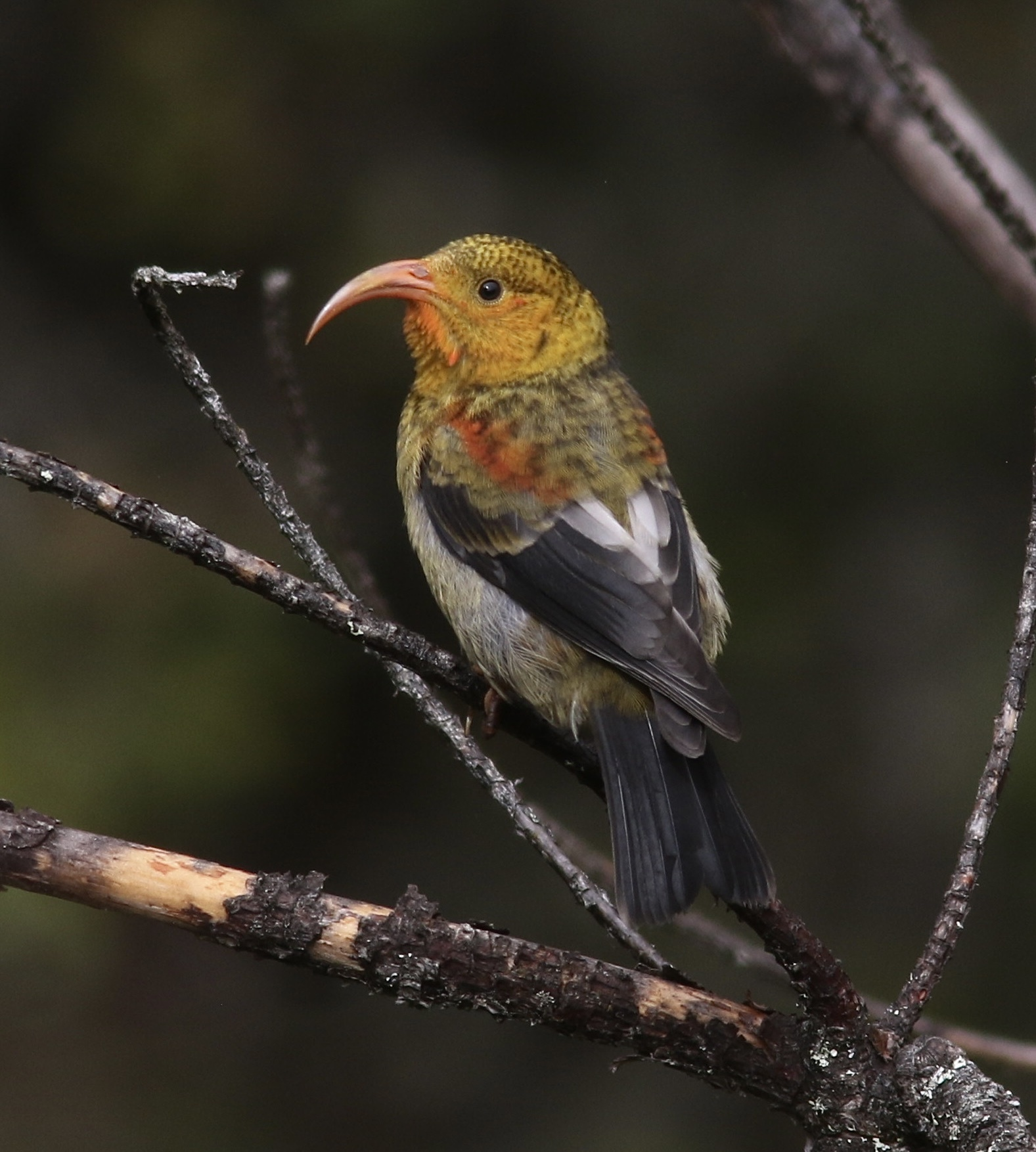
Juvenile

In the early winter in January to June, the birds pair off and mate as the ʻōhiʻa plants reach their flowering maximum. The female lays two to three eggs in a small cup shaped nest made from tree fibers, petals, and down feathers. These bluish eggs hatch in fourteen days. The chicks are yellowish-green marked with brownish-orange. The chicks fledge in 24 days and soon attain adult plumage.

=== Habitat and Distribution ===
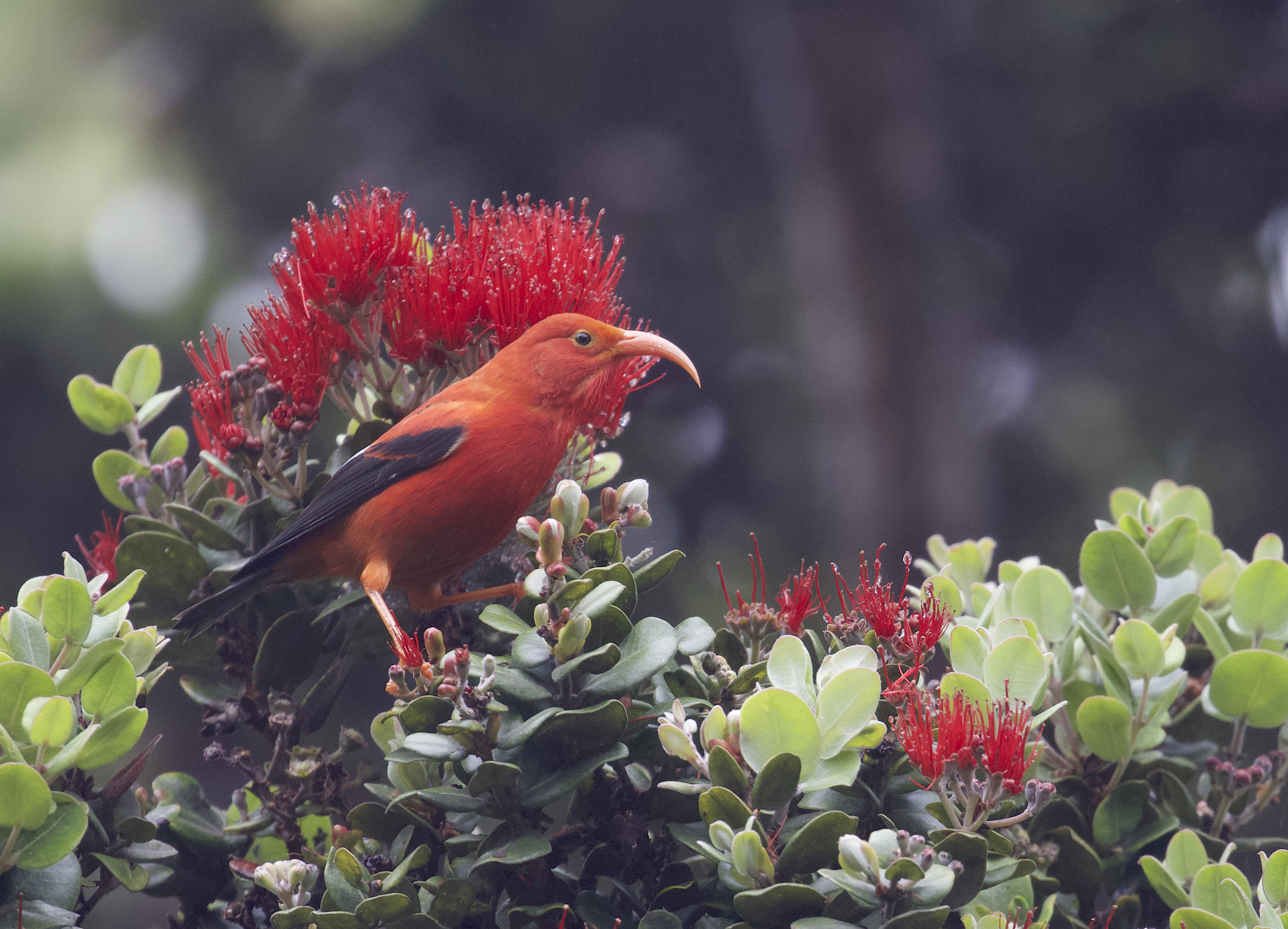
ʻIʻiwi in Hakalau Forest National Wildlife Refuge

The largest populations of ʻiʻiwi inhabit Hawaiʻi Island, followed by Maui with the greatest numbers in East Maui, and fewer than 1% of ʻiʻiwi remain on Kauaʻi. There may be remnant populations on Molokaʻi and Oʻahu; very few ʻiʻiwi have been recorded on either island since the 1990s. They are no longer present on Lānaʻi. Overall, ninety percent of the ʻiʻiwi population is confined to a narrow band of forest on East Maui and the windward slopes of the island of Hawaii, between 4,265 and 6,234 feet (1,300 and 1,900 meters) in elevation. They are most abundant in mesic to wet forests at higher elevations.

These birds are altitudinal migrants; they follow the progress of flowers as they develop at increasing altitudes throughout the year. It has also been noted that birds on Mauna Kea, Hawaiʻi Island, likely make daily trips from lower elevations to feed on nectar. Seeking food at low elevation exposes them to low elevation disease organisms and high mortality. It has been theorized that the ʻiʻiwi can migrate between islands and it may be why the bird has not gone extinct on smaller islands such as Molokaʻi. Altitudinal migration complicates population assessment.

== Threats and Conservation ==
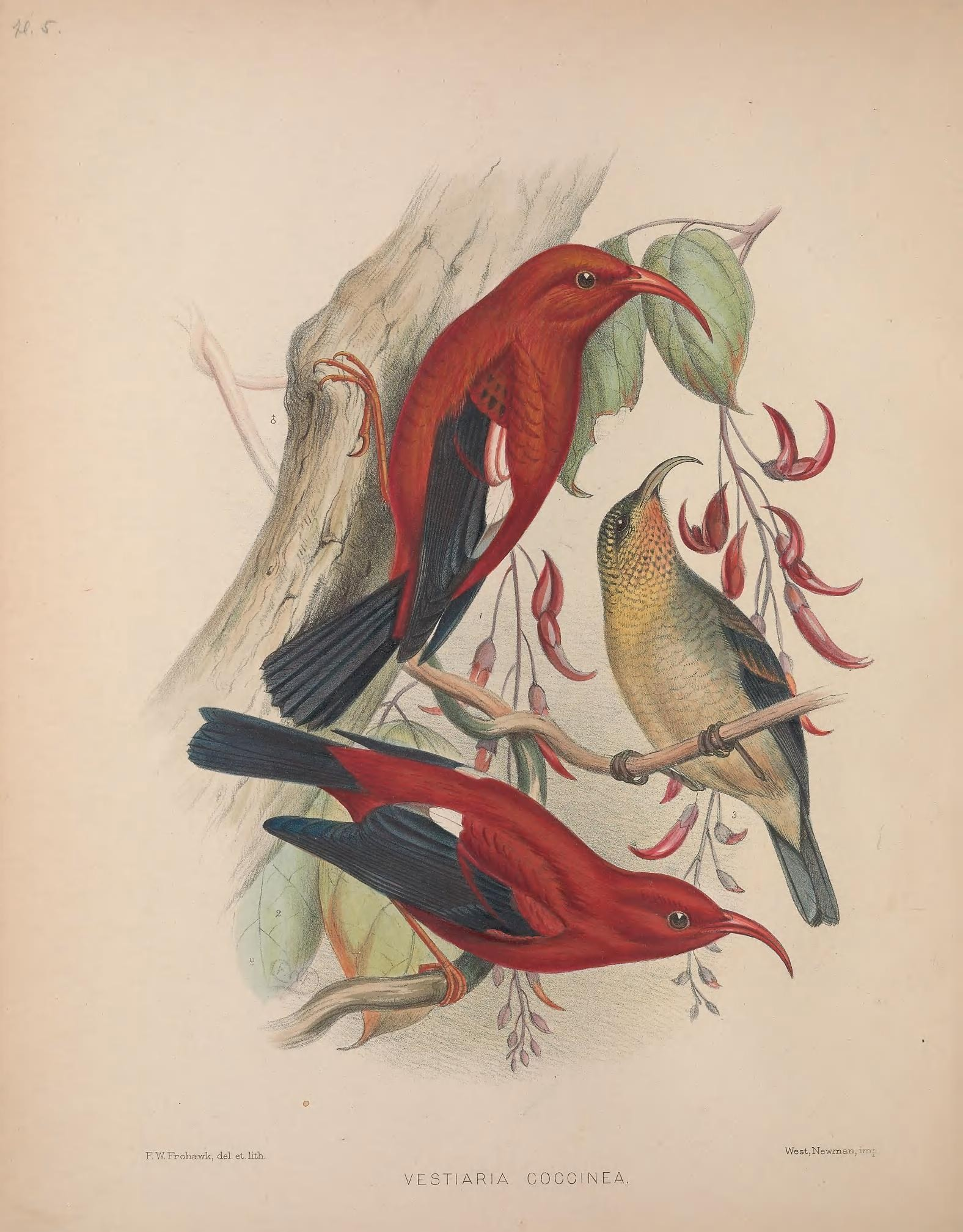
1890-1899 illustration. Male (top), female (bottom), juvenile (middle).

Although 'I'iwi are still relatively common in Hawaii, they have lost over 90% of their range and are being considered to be listed on the endangered species act. ʻIʻiwi was formerly classified as a near threatened species by the IUCN, but recent research has proven that it is rarer than previously believed. Consequently, it was uplisted to vulnerable status in 2008. The species was listed as threatened by the United States Department of the Interior on 20 October 2017.

=== Avian Malaria ===
ʻIʻiwi are listed as a threatened species because of small and declining populations in some of its range and its susceptibility to fowlpox and avian malaria. Avian malaria (Plasmodium relictum) is an introduced disease that is spread by mosquitoes. ʻIʻiwi generally survive at higher elevations where temperatures are too cool for mosquitoes. Many disease-susceptible endemic birds, including ʻiʻiwi and kiwikiu, became rare to absent at lower elevations, even in relatively intact native forest. Avian malaria has been identified as the primary driver of declines in abundance and distribution of ʻiʻiwi observed since 1900. They are one of the most susceptible Hawaiian honeycreepers, with more than 75% exposure to the bird after being bitten by a single mosquito and with 90% overall mortality. One of the main reasons the 'I'iwi get exposed to malaria is because the birds move down to lower elevations post breeding season in order to track more food from ˋŌhiˋa trees and were shown to be exposed to malaria much more often than those birds who were more sedentary and stayed in higher elevation zones. In another study, they were also shown to have the longest movement patterns out of any of three other native Hawaiian birds, which may also be spreading avian malaria amongst the 'I'iwi. In middle elevations, there is a growing number of mosquitoes in the fall that facilitate disease transmission and affect the birds at higher elevations that travel to lower elevations to forage for food. 'I'iwi usually reside at high enough elevations that they are not exposed to the disease. However, with climate change, they are expected to be exposed to the disease even more as the climate warms and the disease is able to develop in mosquitoes at higher altitudes where the 'I'iwi used to be somewhat safe. As for the current abundance of 'I'iwi in these areas, there were more 'I'iwi found above 1350 m in altitude when compared to a survey done in 1979. There were also no 'I'iwi found in mid-elevations, while back in 1979, 37% of the 'I'iwi found were located here, which gives further evidence that they are being pushed into higher elevations because of global warming. For these reasons, it has been projected that the 'I'iwi may be on the verge of extinction by 2100. There is a movement to begin an official eradication of mosquitos in Hawaii, as there are no native species on the islands, and their removal would not hurt the food web. Each week, 250,000 male mosquitoes who cannot produce offspring with local female mosquitoes are released from helicopters to suppress the mosquito population.

=== Land Conservation and ˋŌhiˋa Death ===
ʻIʻiwi habitat has been reduced and fragmented through various types of land development, including clearing native forest for food crops and grazing. Invasive plants also outcompete and displace native plants that ʻiʻiwi use for foraging and nesting. Invasive animals impact ʻiʻiwi in a variety of ways, for example feral ungulates may trample native plants and spread nonnative plants and invasive seeds, further degrading habitat. Feral pigs often create wallows by knocking over vegetation and hollowing out areas that fill with rain water. These have the potential to become incubator sites for mosquito larvae, which in turn spread avian malaria.

Another problem aiding the extinction of the 'I'iwi is the death of the ˋŌhiˋa tree. The ˋŌhiˋa tree is known to act as shelter for various rare and endangered species and be a food source for many birds on the island, making it one of the most important sources of nectar for Hawaiian Honeycreepers and the most important tree in regards to ecology in Hawaii. However, in recent years many of the trees have begun to die out due to a disease called Ceratocystis Wilt, also called Rapid ˋŌhiˋa Death, which causes rapid death of the leaves on a single branch that spreads to the rest of the tree incredibly quickly. There has been extensive death of these trees in untouched part of the forest, which has further contributed to the problem of the 'I'iwi having to leave higher elevations to find food and being exposed to malaria.

=== Mitigating Threats and Conservation Issues ===
One way that has been studied to help mitigate the issue of 'I'iwi and avian malaria is through gene editing to make 'I'iwi that are resistant to malaria. However, a very large number of gene edited 'I'iwi would have to be released before the year 2050 in order for this strategy to work, which would be extremely expensive. There have also been various other solutions proposed, like gene edited mosquitoes, feral pig control in order to reduce habitats for mosquito larvae, and 'I'iwi predator control in order to increase the population. Other solutions include getting rid of invasive species that produce nectar and increasing native flowering plants in higher elevations so that the 'I'iwi do not have to go into the lower elevation, mosquito infested areas to forage for food.

Organizations throughout the islands have established nature reserves to protect native habitat. Fencing off sections of land to keep out feral ungulates, especially pigs, goats and axis deer enables native plants to recover from overgrazing and ungulate damage and helps restore native bird habitat. In recent years another threat has put native bird habitat at risk. Conservation groups are diligently working to reduce the risk of spreading a disease called Rapid ˋŌhiˋa Death (ROD). This disease along with ʻōhiʻa dieback and ʻōhiʻa rust could lead to a rapid decline in ʻōhiʻa forests, an important nectar source for ʻiʻiwi.

== In popular culture ==
A feather of the i'i'wi plays a prominent part in "The Case of the Feather Cloak" episode of Perry Mason (season 8, episode 19, first broadcast February 11, 1965).

== See also ==
- List of adaptive radiated Hawaiian honeycreepers by form
