= Lady Titi Singing Blues =

2018 film by Esti Almo Wexler

- Directed by: Esti Almo Wexler
- Screenplay by: Esti Almo Wexler
- Starring: Zvika Hizikias, Elsa Almo, Lirit Balaban
- Cinematography: Zamir Nega
- Release date: October 17, 2018 (Israeli Cinema Day)
- Running time: 94 minutes
- Country: Israel
- Languages: Hebrew, Amharic

Lady Titi Singing Blues (Hebrew: ליידי טיטי, lit. 'Lady Titi') is a 2018 comedy-drama film directed by Esti Almo Wexler.

== Plot ==
Worko (Zvika Hizikias), is a 27 year old failed musician with sexist attitudes from Israel's marginalized Ethiopian community, who lives in Tel Aviv and gets in trouble with loan sharks. He escapes to Beit Shemesh, where he grew up, there he finds work in a community center while presenting as a woman named Titi, whose job is to facilitate women's empowerment workshops for Ethiopian women. He faces several challenges in this work: For one, he falls in love with his co-worker, Alsech (Elsa Almo), and must deal with the Ashkenazi director of the center (Lirit Balaban) who pretends to be a committed advocate for the Ethiopian community, but in reality looks down on the people she is supposed to serve, and is condescending towards them. Worko is very successful in this work, and becomes a leader to the women, and an object of hope. From the moment he became woman, Worko experiences all the double and triple oppressions of being a woman, of color, from a derided immigrant community. Meanwhile, the loan sharks hire a local to track Worko down, putting his mother (Tehilla Yashayauh-Adgeh) and other family members at risk.

== Cast ==
The lead cast of the film includes:

- Zvika Hizikias - Worko
- Elsa Almo - Alsech
- Lirit Balaban - Community center director
- Tehilla Yashayauh-Adgeh - Worko's mother
- Beyene Gethon

== Production ==
Lady Titi Singing Blues was produced with support from the Rabinowitz Arts Foundation, the Israeli Film Council, Israel's Ministry of Culture, and the New Fund for Cinema and Television.

Days before filming was to begin, Almo Wexler did not have a leading actress cast, and she asked her sister Elsa Almo to step up, in spite of her lack of experience. The choice proved a correct one, as Almo received positive reviews for her performance.

== Reception ==
Lady Titi is viewed by critics as part of a growing wave of Ethiopian-Israeli creations with cultural significance that is yet to be fully studied. It is only the second feature-length Israeli narrative film directed by an Ethiopian woman, following Fig Tree, also a 2018 release. Gal Uchovsky sees the film as an attempt to examine the status of Ethiopian-Israeli women both in the general Israeli context, and in the Ethiopian community itself. In his generally positive review, he focused on the cultural aspects of the film, as representing a new and different voice in Israeli cinema—the "Israeli" part being the significant appellation, as he is determined to have the Ethiopian creators seen as part of the Israeli oeuvre. He does not find the director's debut film free of fault, but cites the many "points of light" it offers, in particular the new, young and talented cast, the fun soundtrack of Ethiopian music, and the successful cinematography of Ethiopian-Israeli Zamir Noga.

The Habama review, awarding the film 3/5 stars, emphasizes that Lady Titi is not a film about transgender people or gender identity, but rather attempts to show different, less commonly depicted aspects of the Ethiopian community, in a sense "bucking its conventions", which are generally perceived as conservative, separatist, and closed. The review finds the acting sometimes overly-theatrical, and the story not fully gelled, and yet concludes it is a good effort that will hopefully bear more significant fruit in Esti Almo Wexler's future projects.

== Awards ==
Year	Award	Category	Result
2018	Israeli Film Academy (Ophir Award)	Best Makeup	Nominated
2018	Israeli Film Academy (Ophir Award)	Best Sound	Nominated
2018	Israeli Film Academy (Ophir Award)	Best Costume Design	Nominated
