= Estee (given name) =

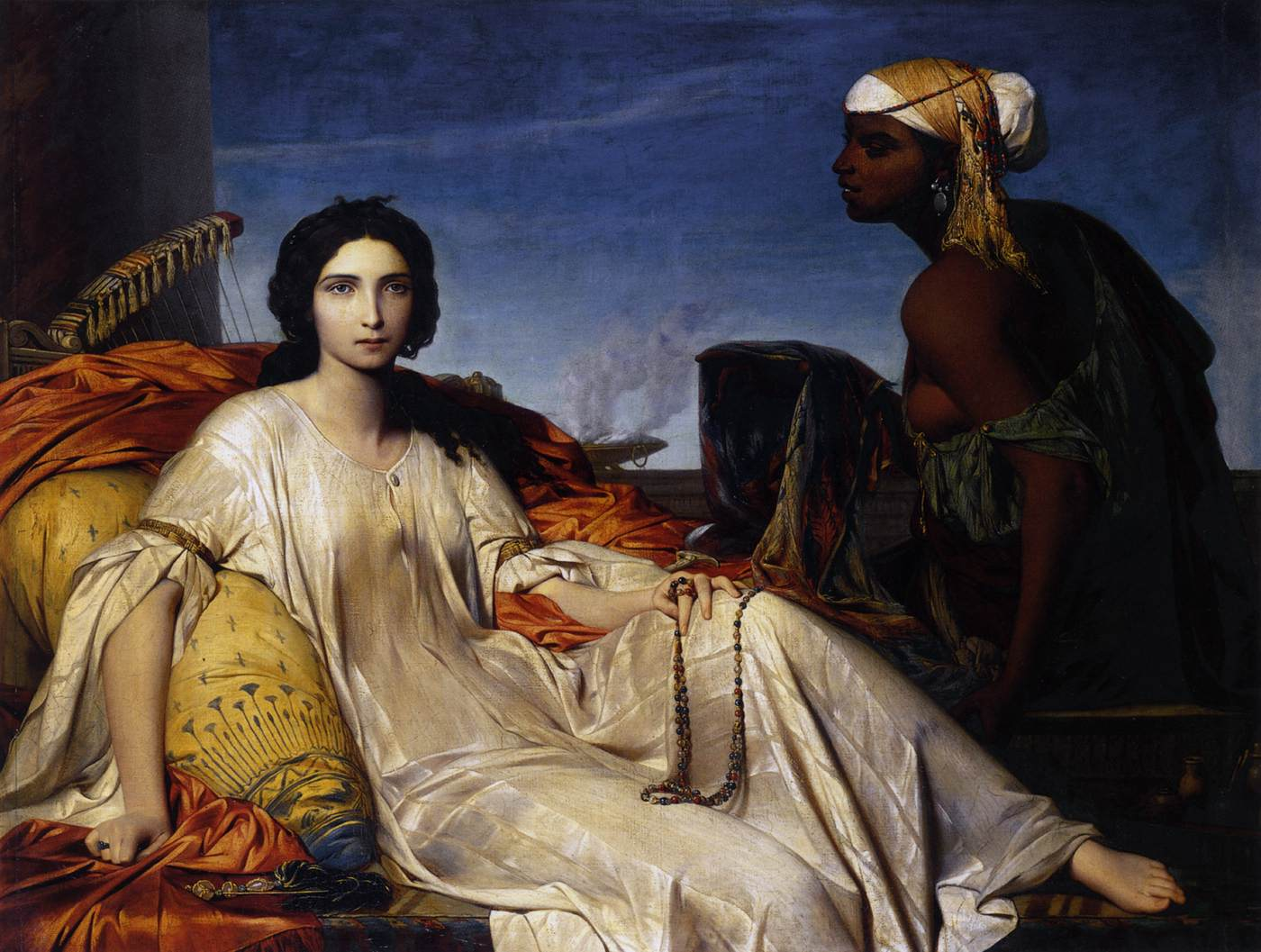
- Queen Esther by Léon Benouville, 1887. Estee is a diminutive of the name Esther, often used in reference to the Biblical Esther.
- Gender: Female
- Language: Hebrew

Origin
- Meaning: Star

Estee (/ˈɛstiː/ (EST-ee) and Estée (/ˈɛsteɪ/) (EST-ay) are feminine given names, both diminutives of the name Esther.

It may refer to:

- Estée Cattoor (born 2004), Belgian footballer
- Estée Lauder (1908-2004), American entrepreneur and namesake of Estée Lauder Companies
- Estee Portnoy, American business executive
- Estee Shiraz, American-Israeli entrepreneur, communication expert and mediator

== See also ==
- Estee (disambiguation)
- Esti (given name)
