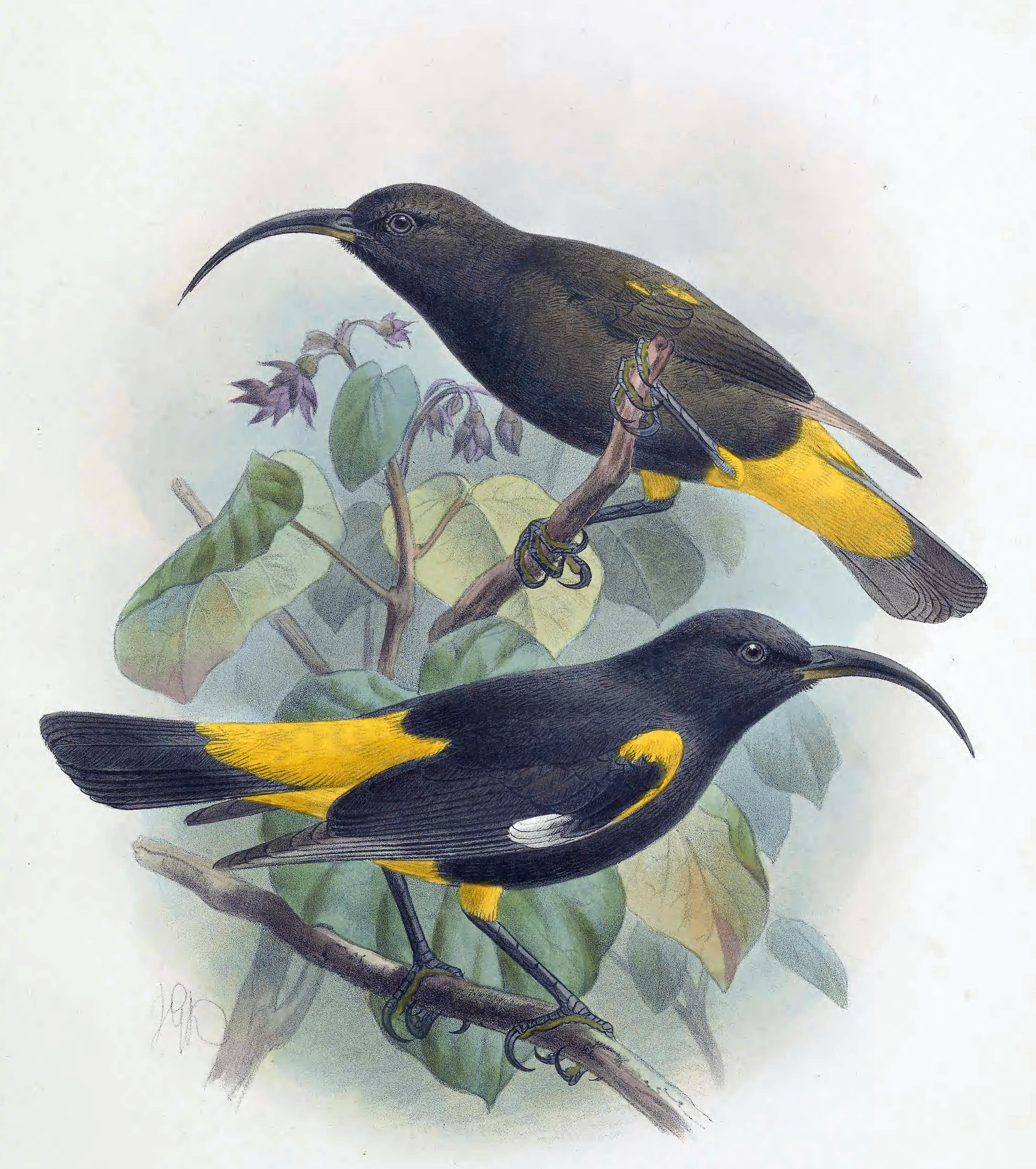
- Hawaii mamo, Drepanis pacficia

Scientific classification
- Kingdom: Animalia
- Phylum: Chordata
- Class: Aves
- Order: Passeriformes
- Family: Fringillidae
- Subfamily: Carduelinae
- Genus: Drepanis; Temminck, 1820

Type species
- Certhia pacifica Gmelin, 1788

Species
- See text

= Drepanis =

Genus of birds

Drepanis is a genus of Hawaiian honeycreeper in the subfamily Carduelinae of the family Fringillidae, endemic to Hawaii. It contains two recently extinct species, the Hawaii mamo and the black mamo, notable for their very elongate bills. The ʻIʻiwi (which also has a somewhat elongate bill) has also been historically been placed in this genus, but genetic evidence suggests that it is unrelated and should be placed into its own genus Vestiaria.

== Species ==
It contains the following species:

Image	Scientific name	Common name	Distribution
	Drepanis coccinea	ʻIʻiwi	Hawaiʻi, Maui, and Kauaʻi, with smaller populations on Molokaʻi
	†Drepanis pacifica	Hawaiʻi mamo	Hawaiʻi
	†Drepanis funerea	Black mamo	Molokaʻi

== See also ==
- Hawaiian honeycreepers
- Endemic fauna of Hawaii
