= Argandoña =

Hamlet in Álava, Spain

- Concejo
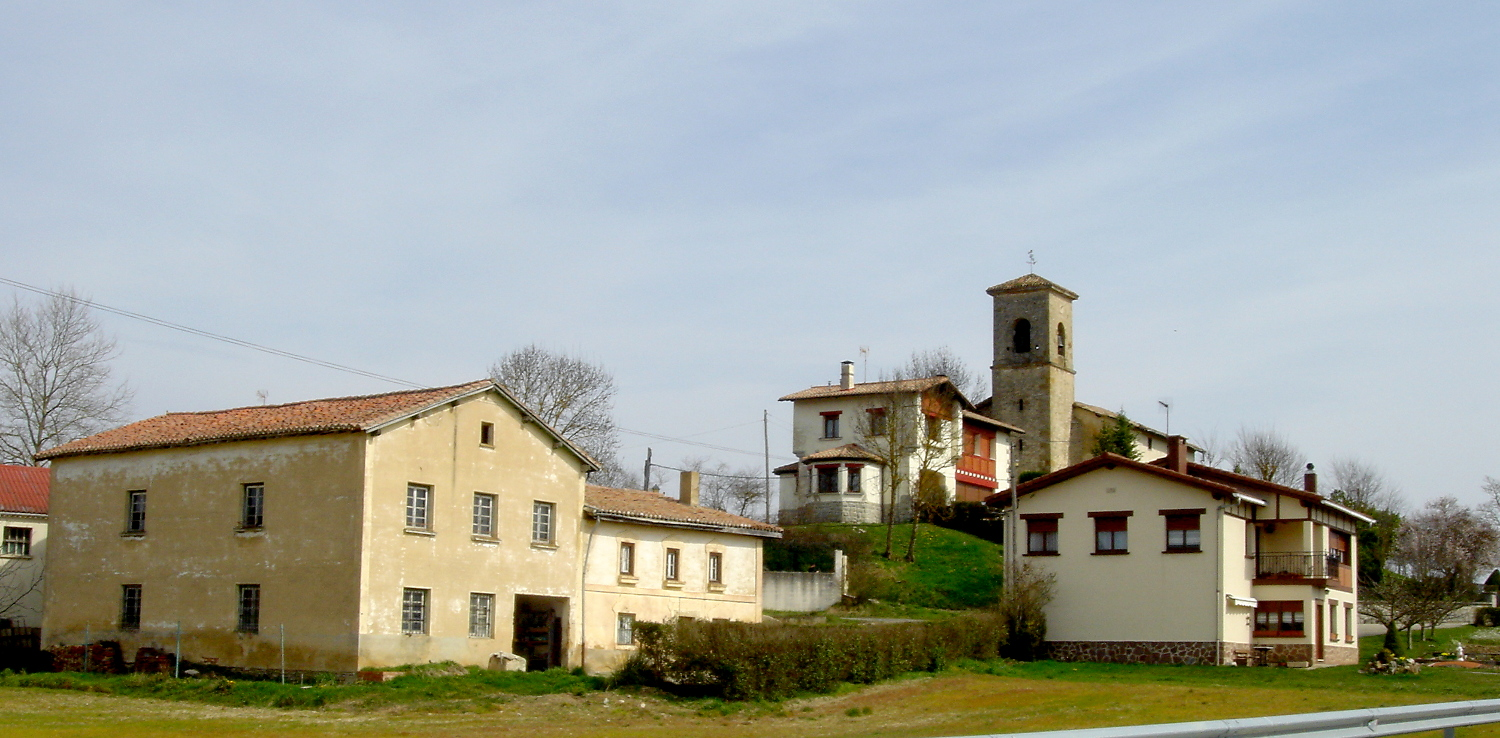
- View of Argandoña

- Coat of arms

- Location within Álava Location within the Basque Country Location within Spain
- Coordinates: 42°50′20″N 2°35′00″W
- Country: Spain
- Autonomous community: Basque Country
- Province: Álava
- Comarca: Vitoria-Gasteiz
- Municipality: Vitoria-Gasteiz

Area
  - Total: 2.76 km^{2} (1.07 sq mi)
- Elevation: 555 m (1,821 ft)

Population (2023)
  - Total: 44
  - Density: 16/km^{2} (41/sq mi)
- Postal code: 01193

Argandoña is a hamlet and concejo in the municipality of Vitoria-Gasteiz, in Álava province, Basque Country, Spain.
