= Sarriguren =

- Locality
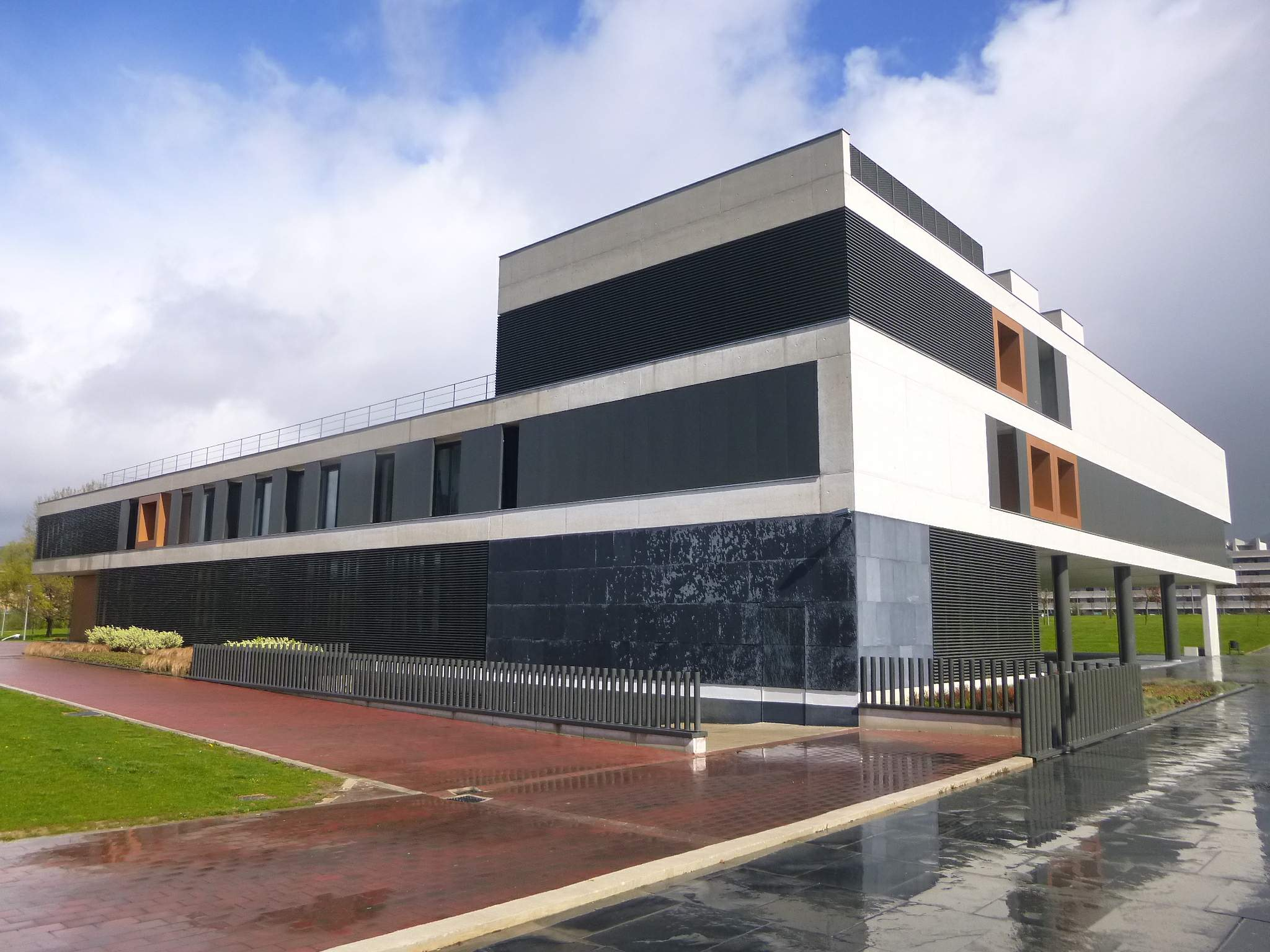
- Town hall of Sarriguren

- Location within Navarre Location within Spain
- Coordinates: 42°48′47″N 1°35′51″W
- Country: Spain
- Community: Navarre
- Province: Navarre
- Municipality: Valle de Egüés
- Elevation: 458 m (1,503 ft)

Population
  - Total: 15,665

Sarriguren is a locality located in the municipality of Valle de Egüés, in Navarre province, Spain, Spain. As of 2020, it has a population of 15,665. Sarriguren is the capital of the municipality of Valle de Egüés.

== Geography ==
Sarriguren is located 6 km (3.7 mi) east of Pamplona.
