= Esty =

Esty may refer to:

== Surname ==
- Alexander Rice Esty (1826–1881), American architect
- Alice Esty (soprano) (1864–1935), American-born operatic soprano
- Alice Swanson Esty (1904–2000), American actress, soprano and arts patron
- Constantine C. Esty (1824–1912), member of the United States House of Representatives from Massachusetts
- Daniel C. Esty (born 1959), Commissioner of the Connecticut Department of Energy and Environmental Protection
- Donald Esty, Jr., American politician from Maine
- Edward S. Esty (1824–1890), American politician from New York
- Elizabeth Esty (born 1959), member of the United States House of Representatives from Connecticut
- Kim Esty, Canadian musician
- L. D. Esty or Lee. D. Esty (1875–1943), American architect
- William Esty (1895–1954), American advertising executive

== Given name ==
- Esty Amukwaya, Namibian footballer
- Esty Chaney (1891–1952), relief pitcher in Major League Baseball
