= Esti Almo Wexler =

Ethiopian-Israeli film director, writer, and cinematographer

- אסתי עלמו וקסלר
- Born: Ethiopia
- Education: Bezalel Academy of Arts and Design, Tel Aviv University
- Occupations: Film director, writer, cinematographer
- Notable work: Lady Titi Singing Blues, Looking for Tena
- Spouse: Elad Wexler
- Children: 2

Esti Almo Wexler or Esti Almo (Hebrew: אסתי עלמו וקסלר) is an Ethiopian-Israeli film director, writer, and cinematographer. Along with her husband Elad, she is the founder of Abayenesh Productions. Her works strive to tell the stories and hardships of Israeli-Ethiopian Jews.

== Early life and education ==
Almo Wexler emigrated to Israel at the age of four, joining her family members who had emigrated there in prior years. In high school, she studied art and design, and often participated in extra-curricular theater activities after school. After completing her mandatory two-year military service, she studied cinema and storytelling at Bezalel Academy of Arts and Design where she got her undergraduate degree and graduated with a masters from Tel Aviv University but could not secure employment and ultimately moved back to her parents house, where she eventually took up film-making and writing about her community's issues.

== Films ==
In high school she produced an animated short called Written in the Sand. Almo Wexler's first professional work was a short film titled Summer of 89 released in 2013. Her first full-length film was titled Lady Titi Singing Blues or sometimes just Lady Titi a comedy-drama about the length an Ethiopian-Israeli individual goes to find employment. Although a comedy, it deals with serious issues affecting the Ethiopian-Israeli community, including poverty, underemployment, and institutional racism. Almo Wexler also directed a documentary titled Looking for Tena, about a family's efforts to find a relative in Sudan who had converted to Islam and given up their Jewish culture. The documentary dealt with double rejection of the family, both from Israeli society but also from the Ethiopian Jewish community.

== Personal life ==
She is married to Elad Wexler, whom she met when the two studied at Bezalel Academy of Arts and Design. They are also business partners, and have their own film company they co-own named Abayenesh Productions. Esti and Elad have two children.

== Filmography ==
- Summer of 89 (2013)
- Lady Titi Singing Blues (2018)
