= Sanctuary of Nuestra Señora de Estíbaliz =

- Santuario de Nuestra Señora de Estíbaliz (Spanish)
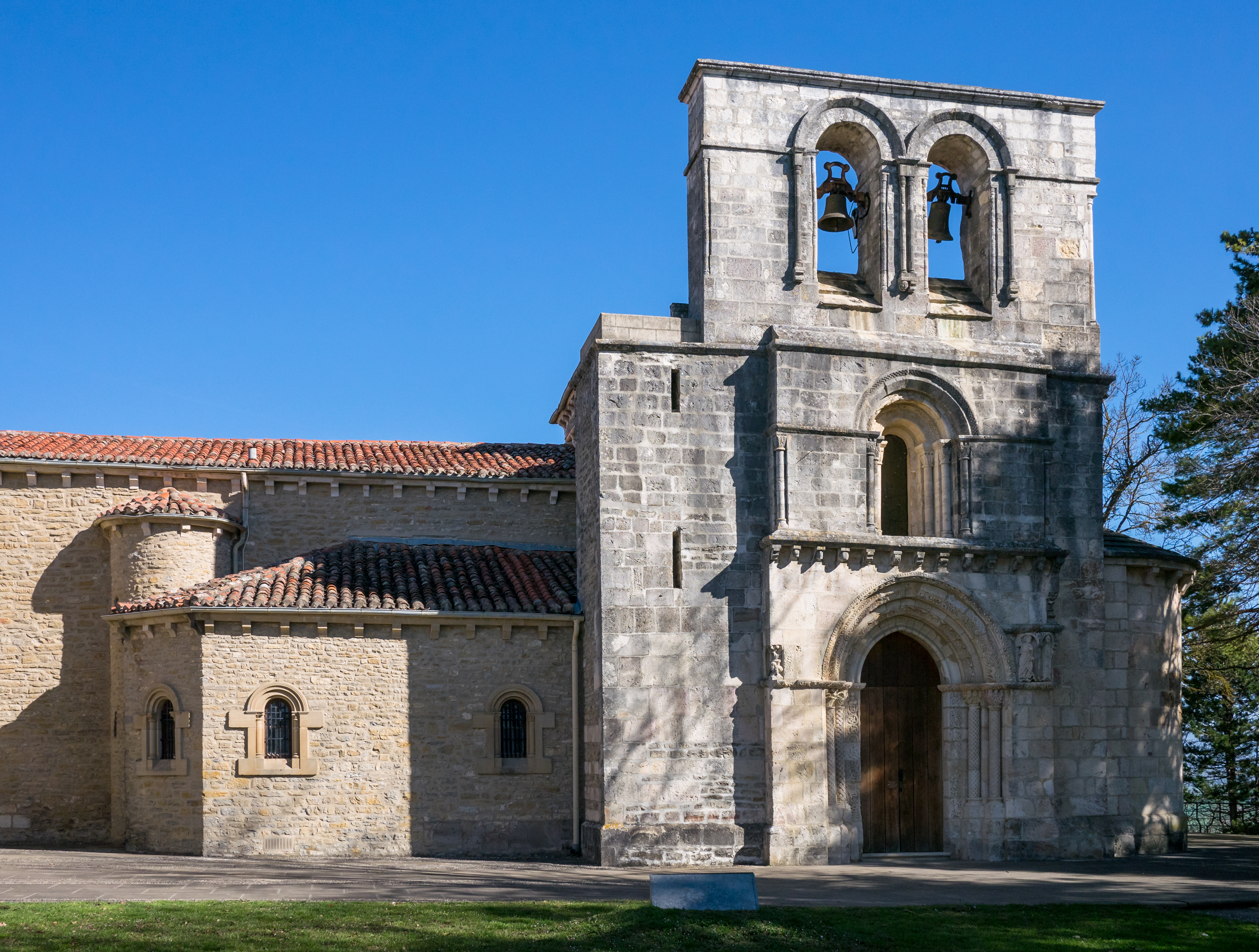

- Location within Spain
- 42.848267°N 2.570331°W
- Location: Argandoña, Spain

Spanish Cultural Heritage
- Official name: Santuario de Nuestra Señora de Estíbaliz
- Type: Non-movable
- Criteria: Monument
- Designated: 1931
- Reference no.: RI-51-0000358

The Sanctuary of Nuestra Señora de Estíbaliz (Basque: Estibalizko Andre Mariaren santutegia; Spanish: Santuario de Nuestra Señora de Estíbaliz) is a sanctuary located in Argandoña within the municipality of Vitoria-Gasteiz, Álava, Spain. It is surrounded with green forests and it has the view of the entire province as it is located in a small hill 9 km away from the city of Vitoria-Gasteiz. Here stands the patroness of Álava. It was declared Bien de Interés Cultural in 1931.

== History ==
The site and the Lady of Estibaliz are first attested on a 962 Navarrese royal charter. The present-day sanctuary was built in the 11th century, and it is a true jewel of Romanesque art. In 1138 it was donated to the benedictine monks of Nájera, who preserved it until 1431 when they sold it to lord Fernán Pérez de Ayala, son of the famous King Enrique de Castilla's chancellor, lord Pedro López de Ayala.

Later, the sanctuary was donated to Santiago's hospital in the city of Vitoria-Gasteiz. In 1542, the donator's inheritor ordered its restoration. The new parts of the sanctuary, most of them restored, were built between the 12th and 13th centuries.

During the 20th century, many young pupils received instruction here with a special focus on religious vocation. Bearing witness to its gone heyday, a Basque-Navarrese Railway line had its terminus in the sanctuary, nowadays dismantled.

== Nowadays ==
Even though it has been damaged over time and during the civil wars what it still exists shows its archaeological value. Some of its details are: the simple floor crowned with three apses, the columns decorated with curious embellished capitals, the font and the front stone of Christ's altar.

== The sanctuary ==
In its south part there is the Porta Speciossa which has a different stile and details. Home of two archivolts and targeted overall, decorated richly with motifs and interlacing that seems to arise from the jaws of a little lion from whom comes the exterior archivolt of the east. In top we can see a mullioned window belfry. The headboard shows in its cylinder center two semi columns topped in two capitals that remain much under the current ledge, indicating with this its primitive height. Only the south apse has a small window decorated with an archivolt and under the central eaves are some decorated corbels and even a capital decorated with a double tail mermaid.

The cover decoration is pointillist and lush. We can see interlacing and geometric decorative motifs in columns. The capitals that crown the columns have also got details as some scrollwork or some little heads. The angel and the Virgin are located on top of a little column in the front door. Both the characters seem to be walking transmitting the lightness of the moment.
