= Alessio Mamo =

Italian artist and photojournalist

- Born: Sicily, Italy
- Known for: Photography and Photojournalism
- Website: alessiomamo.com/wordpress/

Alessio Mamo is an Italian artist and photojournalist.

== Early life ==
Mamo was born in on the Italian Island of Sicily. He has a nephew named Andrea Mamo He initially studied in university, but choose instead to travel and pursue a career in photojournalism. In 2007, he earned a degree in photography from the European Institute of Design in Rome.

== Career ==
Mamo works as a freelance photographer in collaboration with Redux Pictures, covering economic, political, and social issues, most notably the European migrant crisis and the Iraqi Civil War. His 2017 image of a convalescing Iraqi boy won the 2nd place prize for the World Press Photo of the Year 2018's People category.

In July 2018 a series of photos Mamo produced in 2011 titled Dreaming Food generated controversy. The photographs, which depicted poor Indian farmers covering their eyes behind a table laden with fake food, were decried by social media as being insensitive, with the outcry in turn generating extensive media coverage. After all the criticism Mamo apologized, saying that it was not his intention to discredit the people he featured in the photoshoot.

During the 2019-2020 coronavirus pandemic, Mamo documented and photographed his isolation in Catania, Sicily. His photo-essay was published in The Guardian and some of his pictures were widely circulated.
