= Esti Mamo =

Israeli model and actress

Esti Mamo אסתי ממו
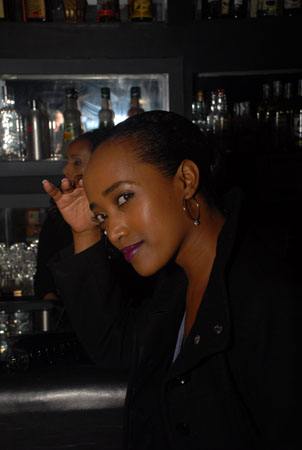
- Mamo in 2009
- Born: Esti Mamo; January 29, 1983 (age 43); Chilga, Ethiopia
- Modeling information
- Height: 1.82 m (6 ft 0 in)
- Hair color: Black
- Eye color: Brown

Esti Mamo (Ge'ez: እስቲ ማሞ istī māmmō; Hebrew: אסתי ממו) born 29 January 1983) is an Ethiopian-born Israeli fashion model and actress.

== Childhood ==
Of Ethiopian Jewish descent, Esti Mamo was born in 1983 in Chilga, in northwestern Ethiopia. She is a member of the Beta Israel community.

At the age of 9, she and her family immigrated from Ethiopia to Israel, where the family lived in a poor district of a southern Israeli city. A younger brother committed suicide in 2004.

As a teenager, Mamo founded a dance group called Mango, which has performed professionally in clubs in Israel and represented Israel in London's Notting Hill Carnival.

== Modeling and acting ==
Initially discovered at 15, Mamo decided to finish school before she began her career.

From 2004 on, Mamo has worked in Europe campaigning for several international brands. She also studied acting in Israel, and has acted in various Israeli TV productions.

== Miscellaneous ==
Esti Mamo is also dedicated to philanthropic work within Ethiopian Jewish, Israeli, and diaspora Jewish communities.

She was voted the 97th sexiest woman of 2005 in an online survey reported in the December edition of men's magazine Blazer.
