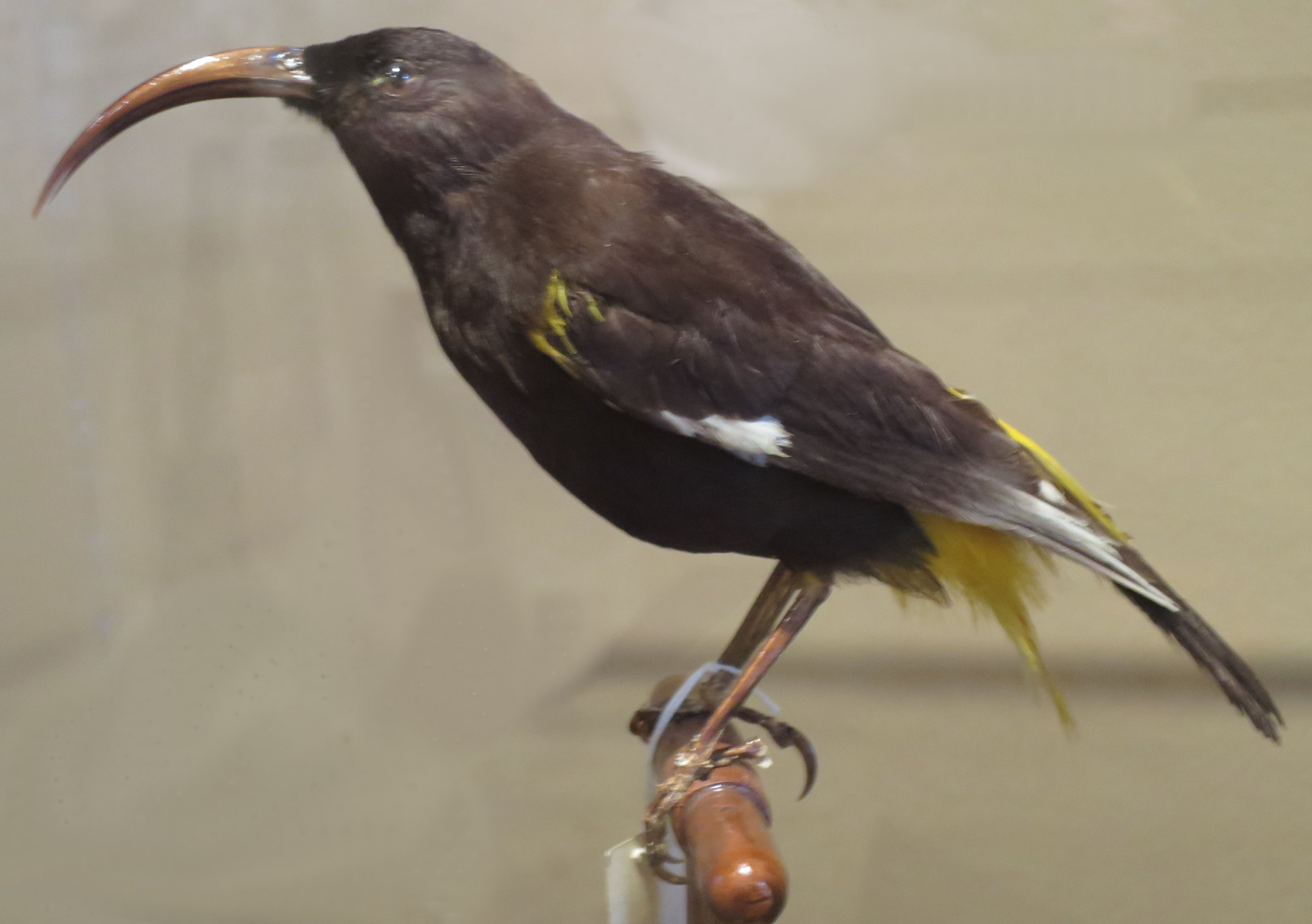
- Specimen

Conservation status
- Extinct (1898) (IUCN 3.1)

- Presumed Extinct (1898) (NatureServe)

Scientific classification
- Kingdom: Animalia
- Phylum: Chordata
- Class: Aves
- Order: Passeriformes
- Family: Fringillidae
- Subfamily: Carduelinae
- Genus: Drepanis
- Species: †D. pacifica

Binomial name
- †Drepanis pacifica (Gmelin, 1788)

= Hawaii mamo =

Hawaiʻi mamo

Extinct species of bird

The Hawaiʻi mamo (Drepanis pacifica) is an extinct species of Hawaiian honeycreeper. It was endemic to Hawaiʻi Island. It became extinct due to habitat loss, mosquitoes, introduced predators such as the small Indian mongoose, and excessive plume hunting.

== Description ==
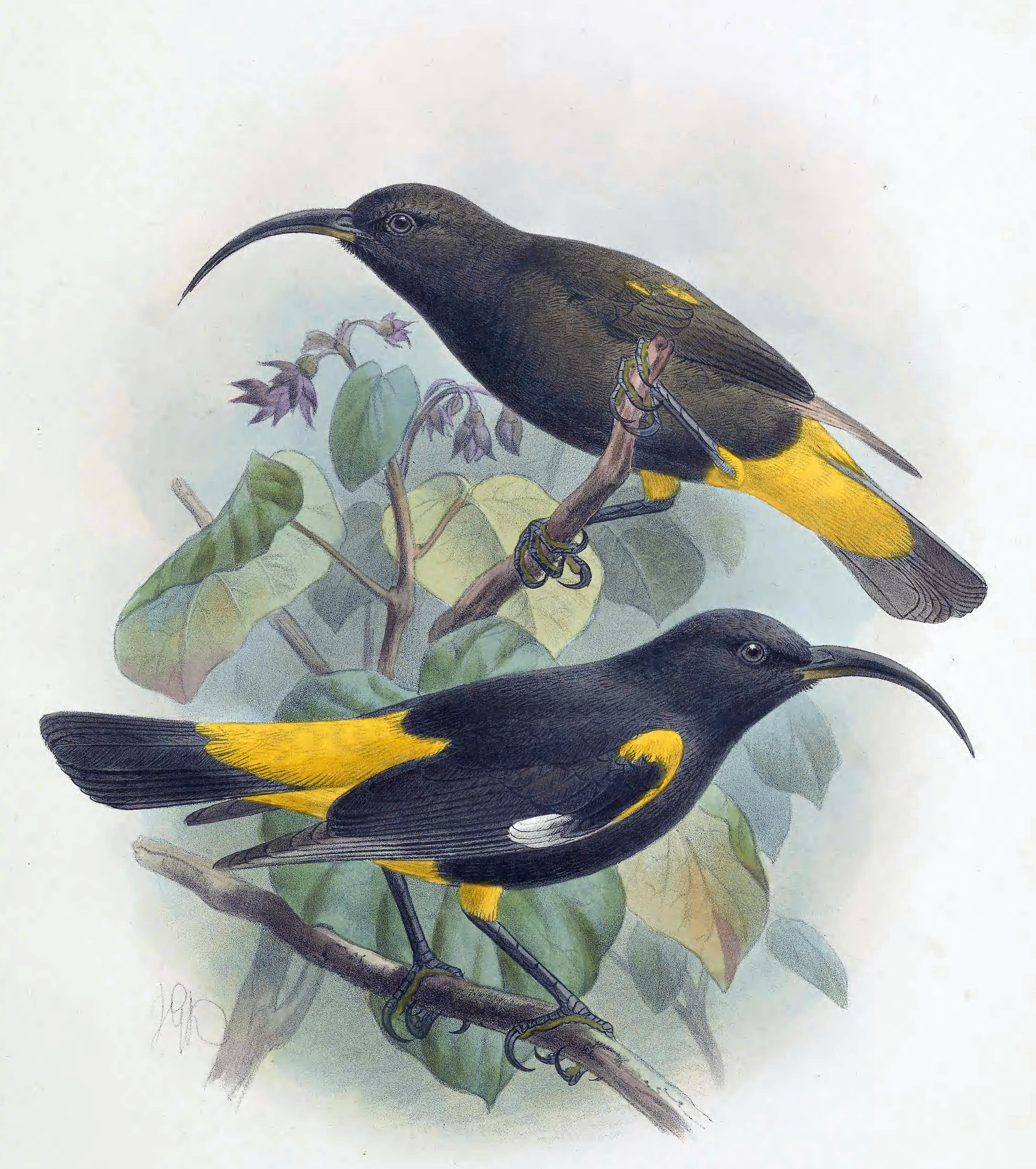
Illustration

The bird's natural habitat was limited to the Big Island (Hawaiʻi Island). This bird averaged 9 inches (22.86 cm) in length. It was mostly black with bright yellow feathers on its rump, undertail coverts, shoulders, and legs. There was a white patch on the primaries. It had small, black eyes and was the centerpiece of portraits. It had a slightly decurved blackish bill, some three inches long. Juveniles may have been brown.

This shy species lived in the forest canopy and fed particularly on nectar of lobelioids from the tree-plant's curved, tubular flowers. The mamo was said to favor feed on the hāhā plant, (Note: Palmer's diary, 13 April 1892.) encompassing Cyanea and Clermontia spp. of lobelioids, but these are also commonly called ʻōhā and other authorities refer to the mamo's feeding plant as ʻōhā, synonymous with ʻōhāhā. (Note: Authorities in the 20th century refer to the plants as "lobelias". Thus Degener construed Oha (ʻōhā) as "Hawaiian Lobelia" and Oha Kepau (ʻōhā kēpau) as "Hawaiian Clermontia". However, all the plants named ʻōhā are now classed as Clermontia, and none retain the genus classification Lobelia (cf. Hawaiian lobelioids).) (Note: Pratt comments that the mamo's diet was probably not restricted to the hāhā and it likely opportunistically fed on other plants. Palmer also mentions attempts to find the bird feeding on an "aku" plant. Emerson writes "keʻa, oha, lehua and mamane" were by bird catchers to attract the mamo, as well as fruits. Greenway adds Pritchardia palms.) There is anecdotal evidence they may have been partly insectivorous. (Note: Henshaw reported seeing a pair (before extinction) chasing insects, also quoted by Pratt) According to Henry C. Palmer, the bird was also fond of the berries of the hāhā, and ironically the berry juice could be made into birdlime.

Its call was a long, plaintive whistle. (Note: The call was demonstrated to Perkins (1903), p. 399).) (Note: As additional testament of frugivorous habit, bird-catchers used the fruit of the banana or ʻieʻie (Freycinetia arborea) to attract the bird.)

== In Hawaiian culture ==
The mamo was one of the most honored birds in pre-European Hawaiian society. Its yellow feathers were used to create capes and hats (featherwork) for royalty. Feather collecting contributed to the bird's decline. The famous yellow cloak of Kamehameha I is estimated to have taken the reigns of eight monarchs and the golden feathers of 80,000 birds to complete.

The natives caught the bird by noose or by birdlime, and would lure it by imitating its call. The call is said to be "a single rather long and plaintive note" so this may have been a song rather than a call. The Hawaiian recipe for their sticky birdlime consisted of sap from breadfruit (Hawaiian: ʻulu) and lobelioids (ʻōhā). (Note: Palmer's noting that hāhā berries became birdlime, as already noted. Otto Degener says " fruit of plants belonging to the groups called lobelia" (p. 129), where he cross-references to his explanation of "lobelia" known by the Hawaiian names oha (ʻōhā)(p. 288) as aforementioned.)

The native feather-hunters (poe kawili) had developed (at the behest of King Kamehameha) the practice of sparing and releasing any birdlime-caught birds with only a few (yellow) feathers to be harvested, namely the ʻōʻō and the mamo. (Note: Little & Skolmen, citing Degener.) However by the 19th century, the kapu against killing mamo and ʻōʻō was not being strictly observed and these birds were being eaten by natives, as ornithologist Henry W. Henshaw suspected, and native historian David Malo has confirmed. Henshaw attributes the acceleration towards extinction to adoption of shotgun-hunting over traditional birdliming.

== Settler impact and extinction ==
Turnaround video

Due to their bright colors, the birds were also popular with European collectors.

European settlers changed the mamo's habitat to support agriculture and cattle ranching, which damaged the bird's food source. Cattle roamed loose in the forests, destroying the understory ecosystem. Small Indian mongooses were introduced to control rats, but they also preyed on native birds. Even though this was discovered early and was well known to the Hawaiians, the mamo quickly disappeared.

Introduced disease may have killed any birds that survived habitat destruction. There are many specimens of this bird in American and European museums. The bird had not been particularly scarce until the 1880s. (Note: Though Force&Force (1968) writes that it became extinct by the 1880's.) The last live specimen was obtained by Henry C. Palmer in 1892. This bird has been reported as tame and unafraid when captured; Palmer's specimen fed on "sugar and water eagerly", and would stay perched on a twig in the tent. (Note: Pratt: "by a native collector, working for Henry Palmer" in 1892". citing Munro (1960).) (Note: 16 April 1892, captured by Ahulau, who set snare and birdlime on the hāhā. cf. also resumé of Palmer's diary.) The last confirmed sighting dates to July 1898 near Kaumana on the Island of Hawaiʻi, as reported by a collector, Henry W. Henshaw, (Note: Pratt, citing Henshaw (1902). Henshaw writes that a year after his own sighting, a native catcher reported hearing the bird's call, but nevertheless did not lead to capture, thus dating the extinction to 1899.) Henshaw in correspondence to Rothschild revealed that when he spotted and he stalked a family of them, he actually shot and wounded one of them, though it escaped.
