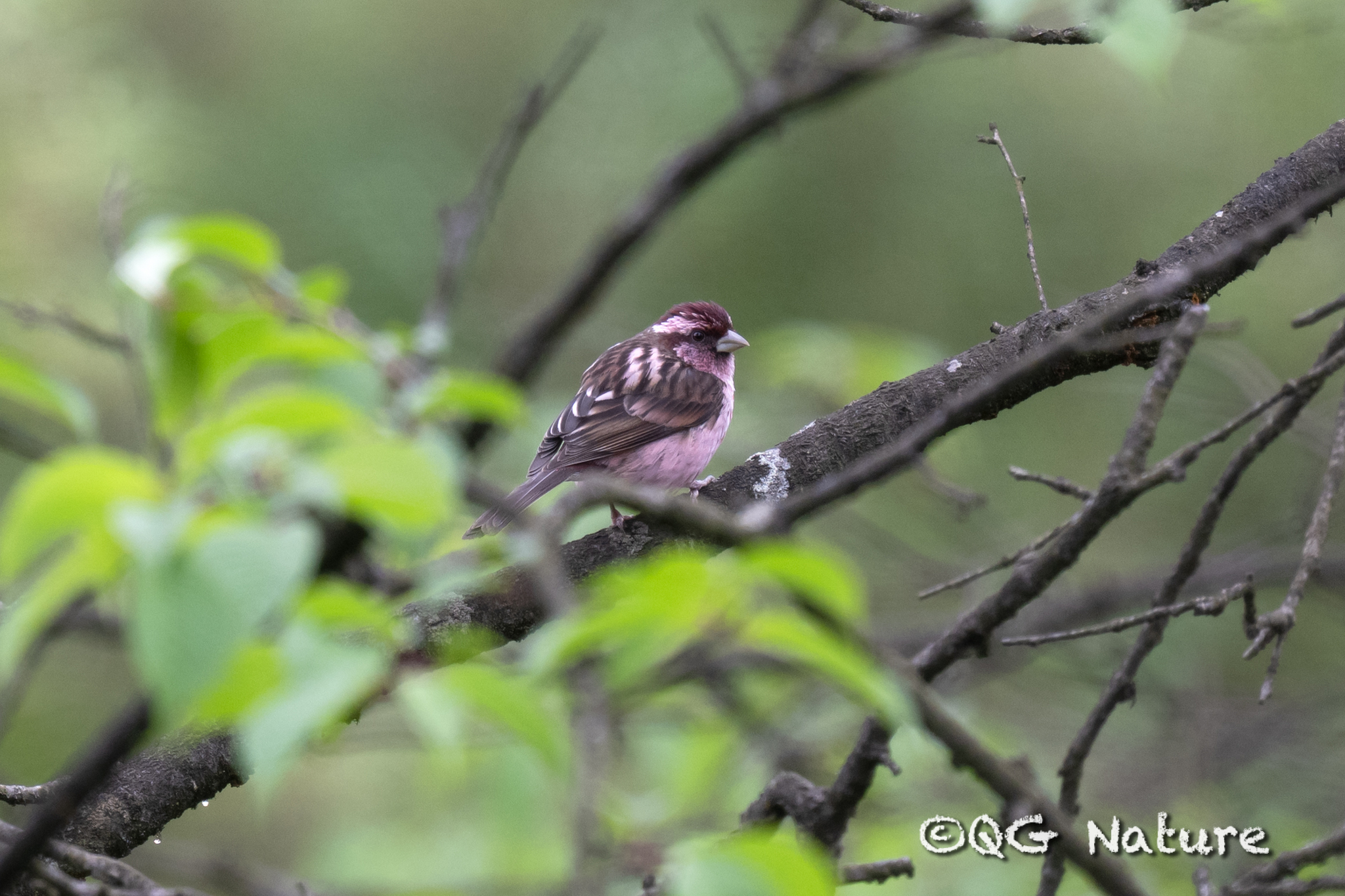

Conservation status
- Least Concern (IUCN 3.1)

Scientific classification
- Kingdom: Animalia
- Phylum: Chordata
- Class: Aves
- Order: Passeriformes
- Family: Fringillidae
- Subfamily: Carduelinae
- Genus: Carpodacus
- Species: C. verreauxii

Binomial name
- Carpodacus verreauxii (David, A & Oustalet, 1877)

= Sharpe's rosefinch =

Species of bird

Sharpe's rosefinch (Carpodacus verreauxii) is a species of finch in the family Fringillidae. It is found in central China and far northern Myanmar. Its natural habitat is subtropical or tropical high-altitude shrubland. It was formerly considered to be a subspecies of the spot-winged rosefinch.

The common name commemorates the British zoologist Richard Bowdler Sharpe.

== Taxonomy and evolutionary history ==
Until recently considered conspecific with C. rodopeplus, but verreauxii differs genetically (1) and in its distinctly smaller bill (at least 2); strong, long black streaks on upperparts (1); and (in male) distinctly paler pink overall appearance vs dark and duller pink with heavy dark markings below (2); bright pink rump vs no distinct paler rump but just a few flecks of pinkish in dark rump feathers (2) (2). Monotypic.

== Description ==
15 cm. Medium-sized slim, relatively small-billed rosefinch with long, slightly notched tail. Male has forehead to nape dark maroon with blackish streaks, very pale pink supercilium (some feathers tipped white) extending from above lores to just behind ear-coverts; lores, ear-coverts and cheeks very dark crimson with variable pink streaking; hindneck to lower back brownish with broad black streaks, scapulars and mantle sides with broad pale pinkish edges, rump contrastingly pale pink and more or less unmarked; upperwing blackish, tertials edged pinkish white, median and greater wing-coverts with pale pink or pale brown tips; tail dark brown, rectrices narrowly edged pink; chin and throat to neck-side dull pinkish maroon, underparts pale pinkish, undertail-coverts very pale pink-tinged greyish white; iris very dark brown; bill dark brownish; legs flesh-brown to pale greyish. Female is greyish olive-brown to greyish brown above, crown to rump heavily streaked blackish, head with pale buff supercilium from above lores to nape-side; upperwing dark brown, flight-feathers finely edged warm brown, tertials broadly edged pale whitish buff towards tips, coverts finely edged paler and tipped pale buff; tail dark brown, feathers edged buffish brown; lores to ear-coverts dark brown, cheeks to chin and throat paler and with blackish streaks; underparts almost entirely warm buff-brown, heavily streaked blackish on lower throat and breast to upper flanks, undertail-coverts paler buff-brown and more or less unstreaked; bare parts much as for male. Juvenile little known; resembles female.

=== Vocalization ===
Song un-described. Call is a short, sharp or piercing, metallic "spink spink".

== Habitat and range ==
S China (S & W Sichuan and NE Yunnan) and NE Myanmar; winters at lower altitudes. Found in summer (presumed breeding period) in forest edge, second growth and areas of scrub and bushes in alpine meadows, at 3000–4600 m. At other times occurs in mixed forest, grassy hillsides with bushes and bamboo thickets at lower levels, at 2100–2900 m.

== Conservation status ==
Not globally threatened (Least Concern). Very poorly known, but appears to be generally scarce to rare in most of its range. Perhaps uncommon in NE Yunnan. Uncommon in NE Myanmar, where possibly only a non-breeding visitor; fieldwork required in order to ascertain this species' true status in that country. It is not known to be subject to any significant threats.
