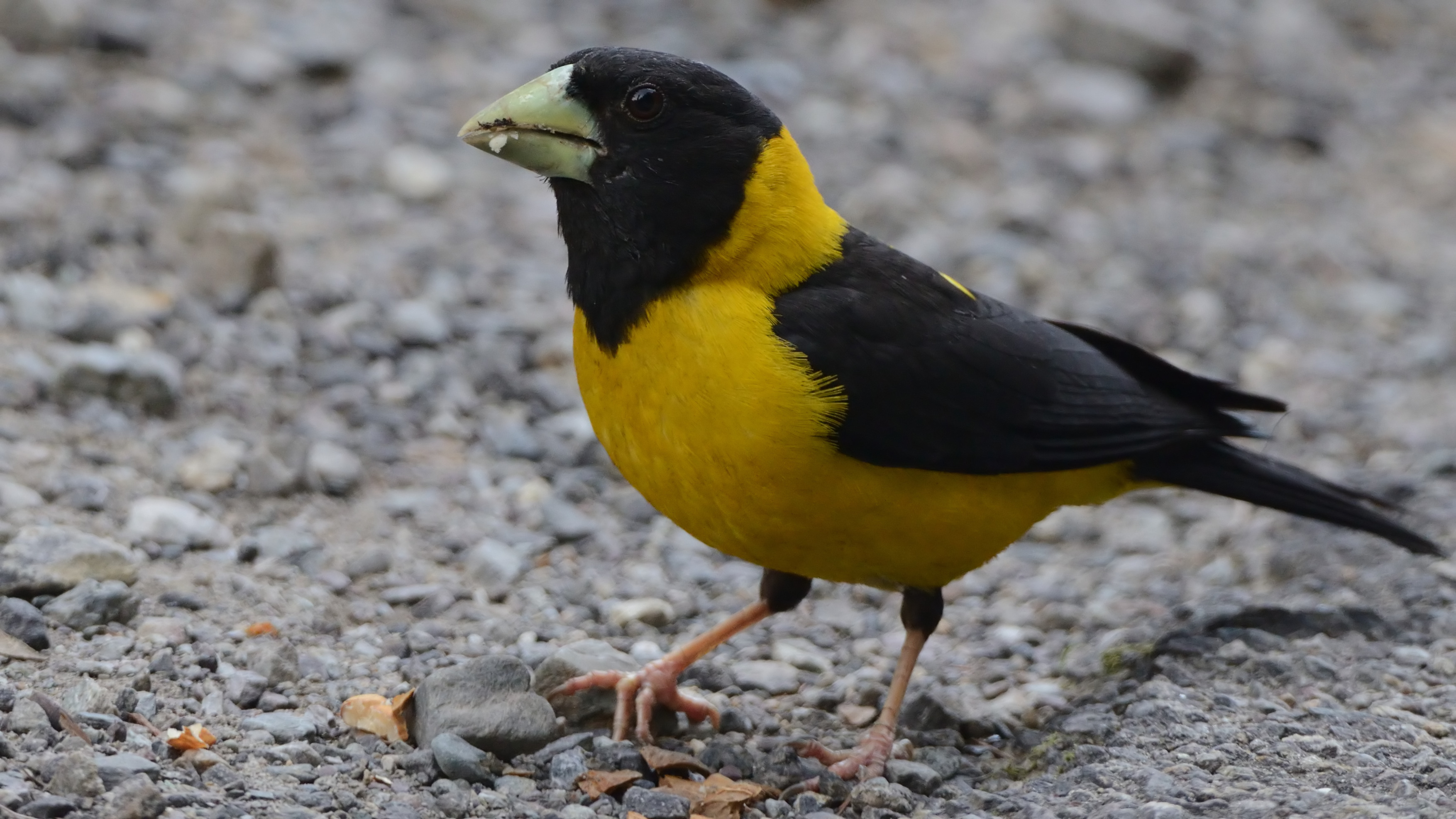
- Male at Dhanaulti, India
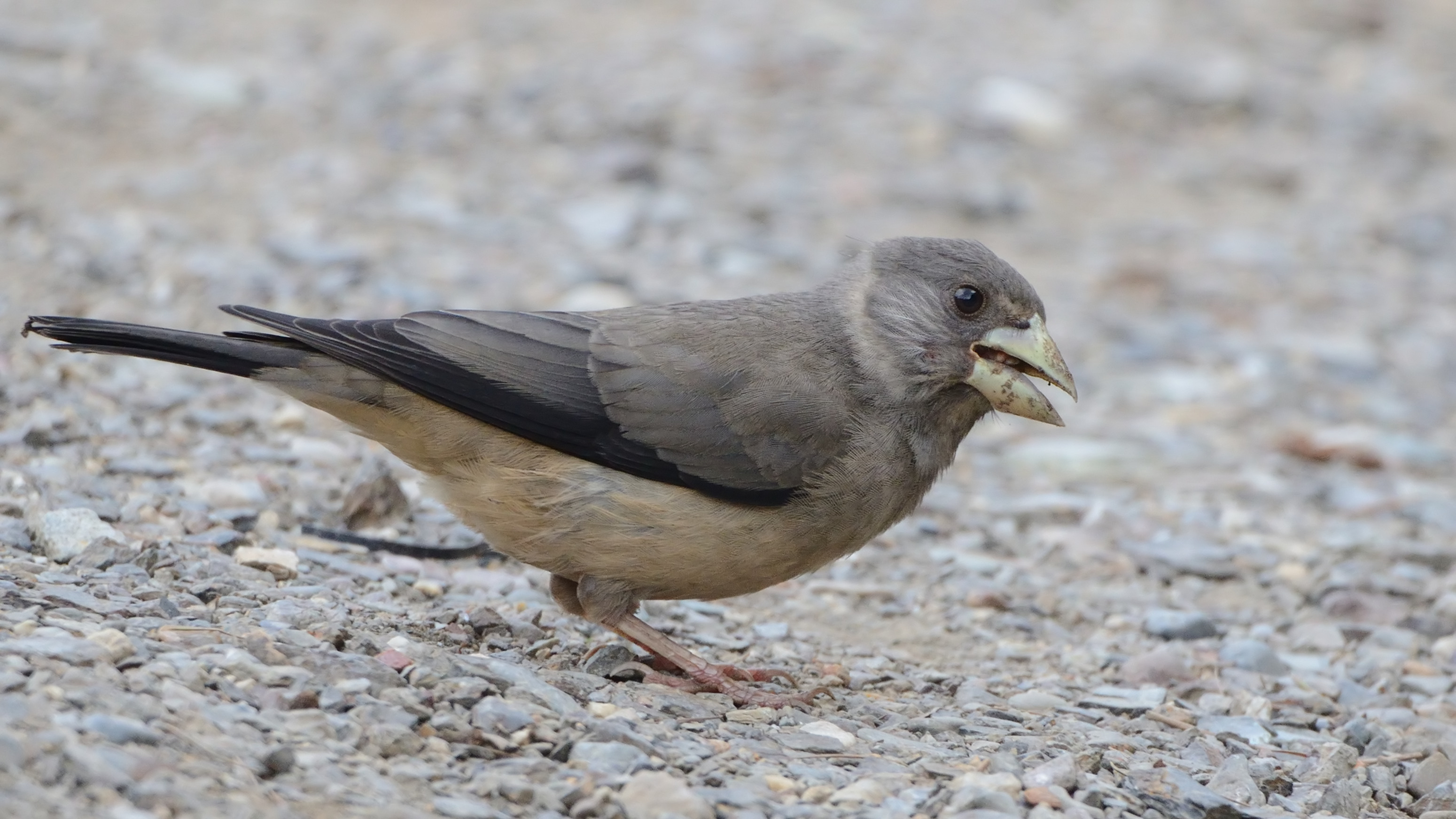
- Female at Dhanaulti, India

Conservation status
- Least Concern (IUCN 3.1)

Scientific classification
- Kingdom: Animalia
- Phylum: Chordata
- Class: Aves
- Order: Passeriformes
- Family: Fringillidae
- Subfamily: Carduelinae
- Genus: Mycerobas
- Species: M. icterioides

Binomial name
- Mycerobas icterioides (Vigors, 1830)

= Black-and-yellow grosbeak =

Species of bird

The black-and-yellow grosbeak (Mycerobas icterioides) is a species of finch native to the northern parts of the Indian subcontinent, primarily the lower and middle Himalayas. It is in the family Fringillidae.

The species ranges across Afghanistan, India, Nepal and Pakistan where its natural habitat is temperate forests.

== Gallery ==
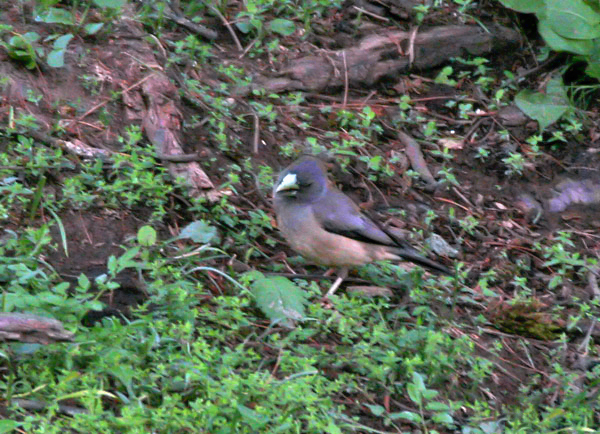
Female at Bhandak Thaatch (8500 ft) in Kullu-Manali District of Himachal Pradesh, India

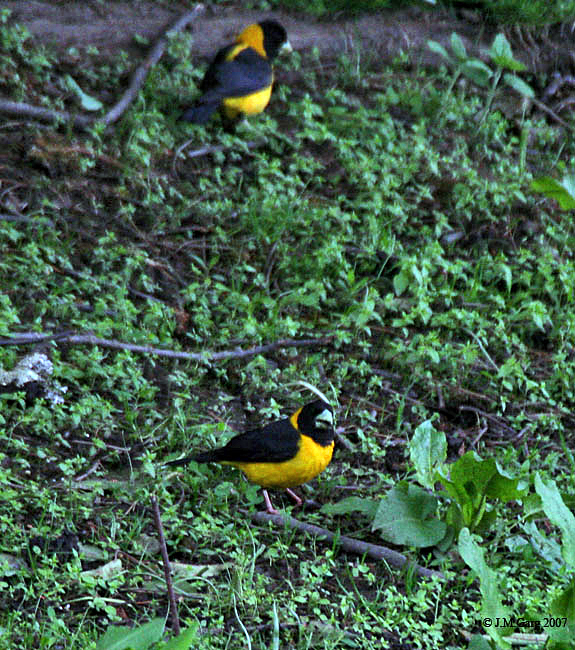
Male at Bhandak Thaatch (8500 ft) in Kullu-Manali District of Himachal Pradesh, India

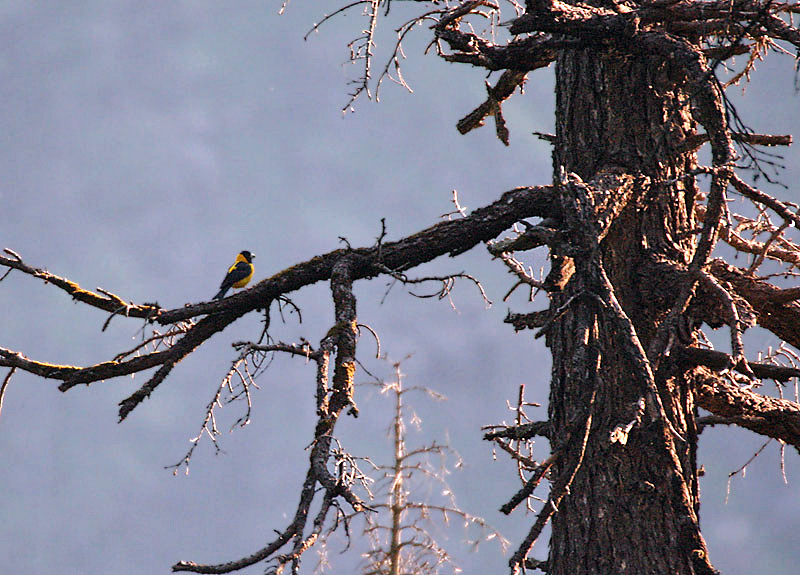
Male at Guna Pani (9000 ft) in Kullu-Manali District of Himachal Pradesh, India

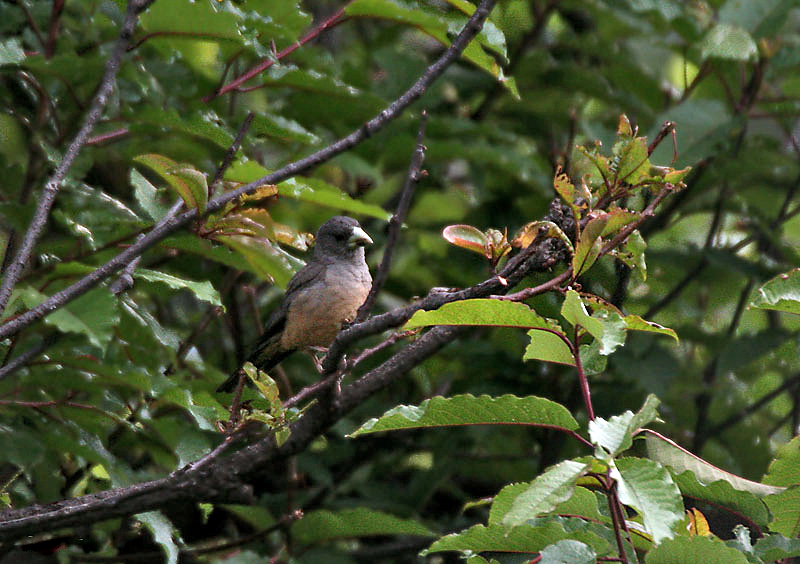
Female at Bhandak Thaatch (8500 ft) in Kullu-Manali District of Himachal Pradesh, India
