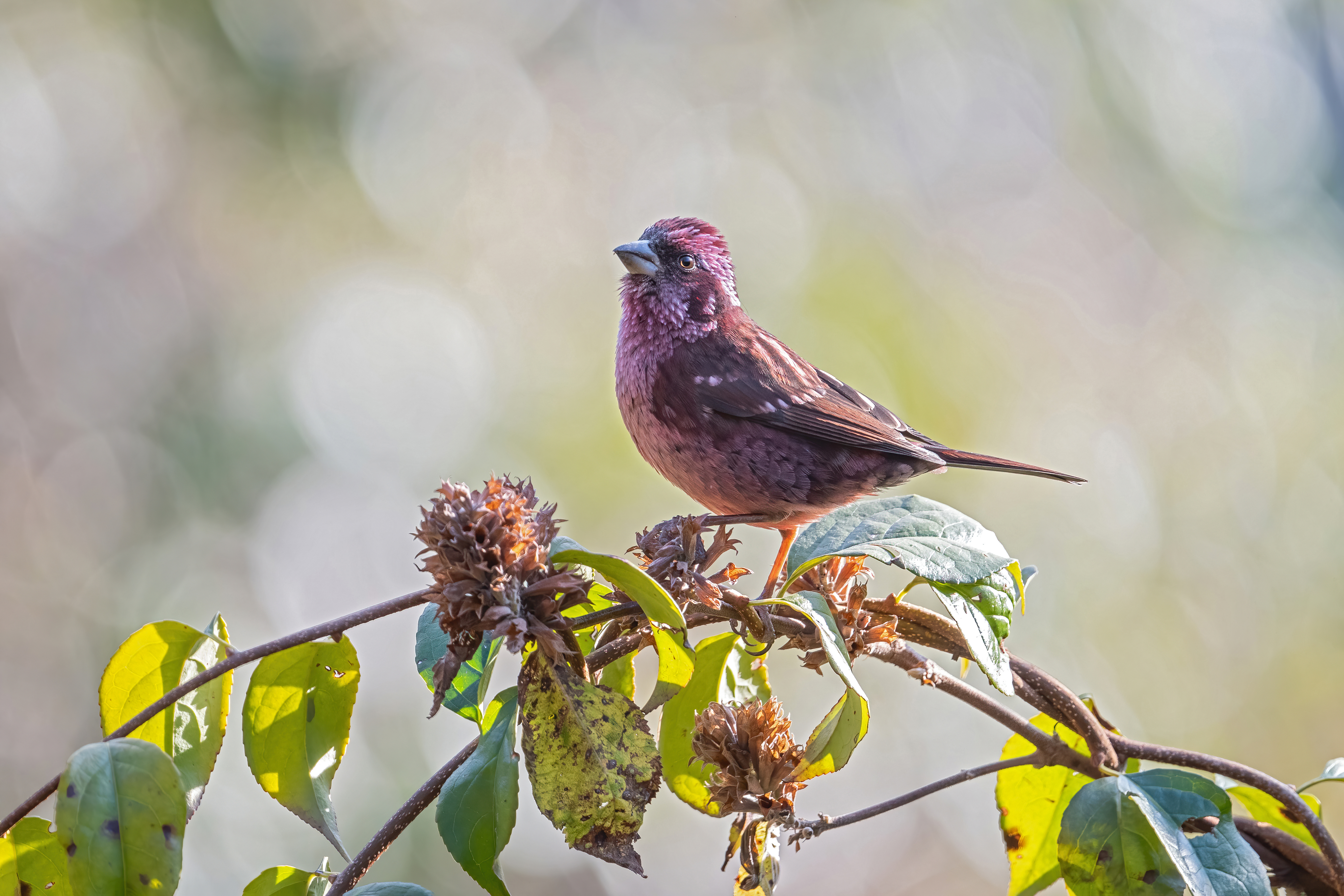
- In Langtang National Park, Nepal

Conservation status
- Least Concern (IUCN 3.1)

Scientific classification
- Kingdom: Animalia
- Phylum: Chordata
- Class: Aves
- Order: Passeriformes
- Family: Fringillidae
- Subfamily: Carduelinae
- Genus: Carpodacus
- Species: C. rodopeplus

Binomial name
- Carpodacus rodopeplus (Vigors, 1831)

Synonyms
- Carpodacus rhodopeplus

= Spot-winged rosefinch =

Species of bird

The spot-winged rosefinch (Carpodacus rodopeplus), also known as the spotted rosefinch, is a species of finch in the family Fringillidae. It is found in India and Nepal. Sharpe's rosefinch was formerly considered conspecific with it. Its natural habitat is subtropical or tropical high-altitude shrubland.

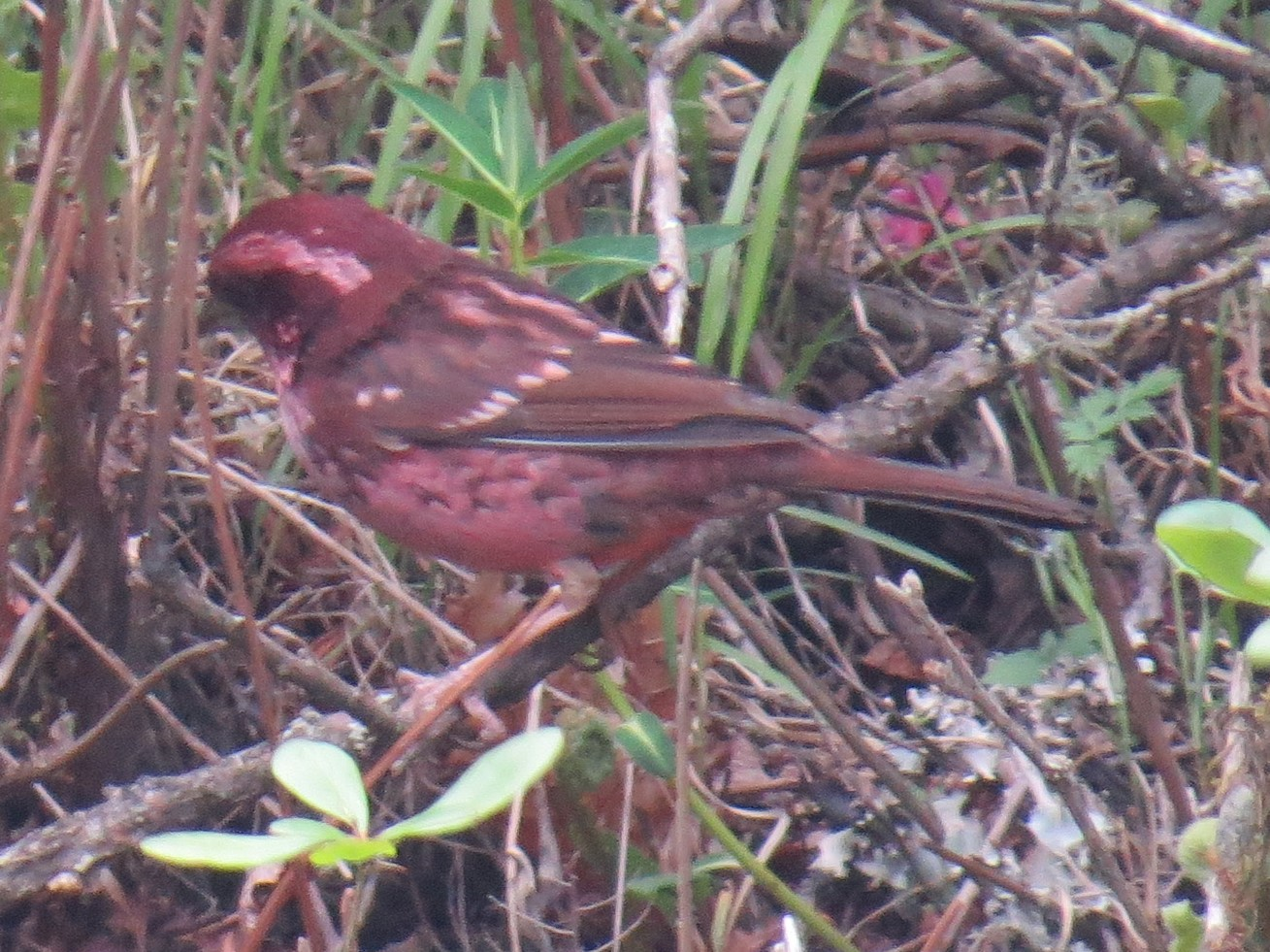
A spot-winged rosefinch in the Langtang Valley of Nepal
