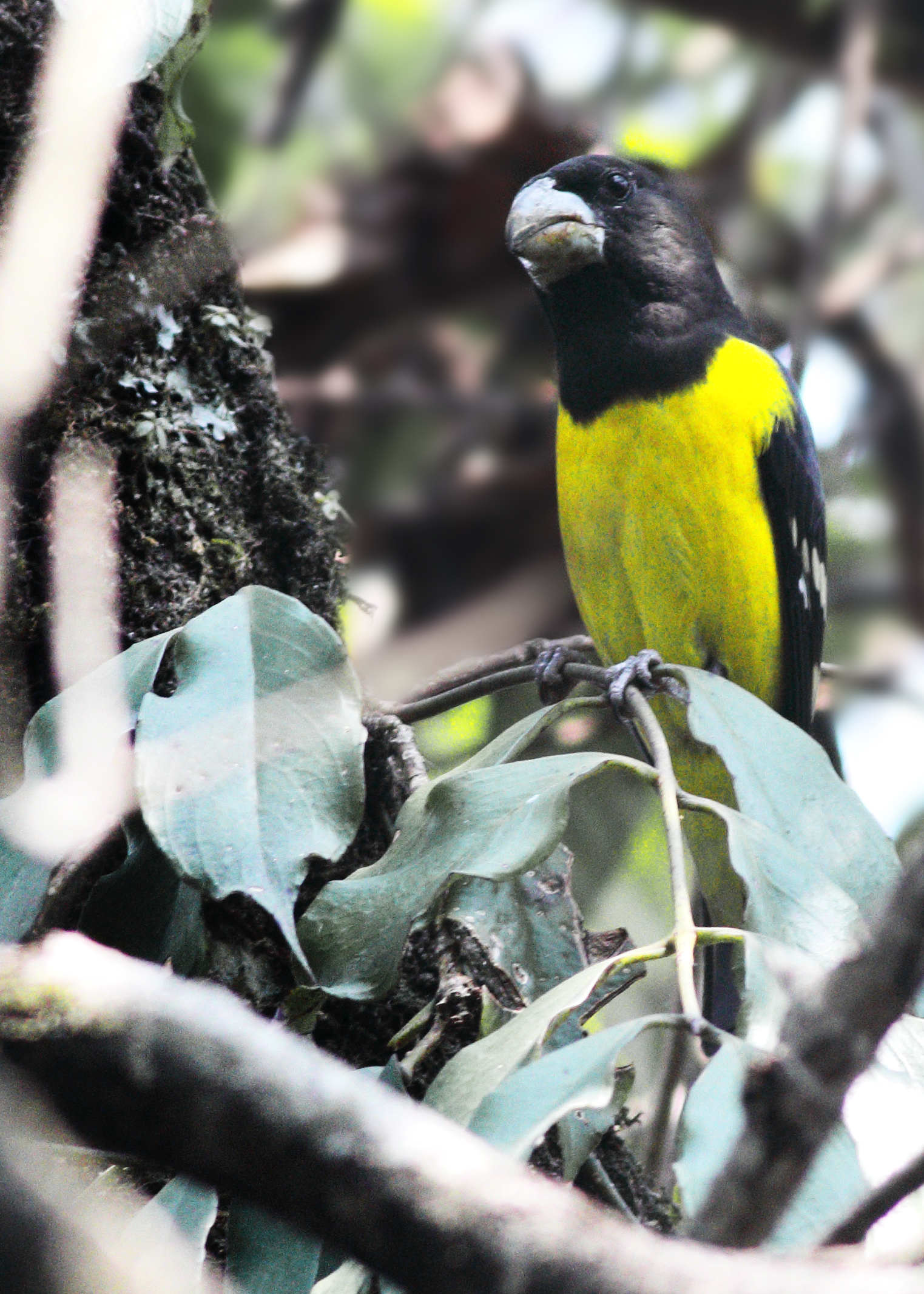
- From Sheyam village, North Sikkim, India

Conservation status
- Least Concern (IUCN 3.1)

Scientific classification
- Kingdom: Animalia
- Phylum: Chordata
- Class: Aves
- Order: Passeriformes
- Family: Fringillidae
- Subfamily: Carduelinae
- Genus: Mycerobas
- Species: M. melanozanthos

Binomial name
- Mycerobas melanozanthos (Hodgson, 1836)

= Spot-winged grosbeak =

Species of finch in the family Fringillidae from Asia

The spot-winged grosbeak (Mycerobas melanozanthos) is a species of finch in the family Fringillidae, found in middle to higher elevations. It is found in the Indian subcontinent and parts of Southeast Asia. Its range includes Bhutan, India, Laos, Myanmar, Nepal, Pakistan, Thailand, Tibet and Vietnam. Its natural habitats are subtropical or tropical dry forests and subtropical or tropical moist montane forests.

== Gallery ==
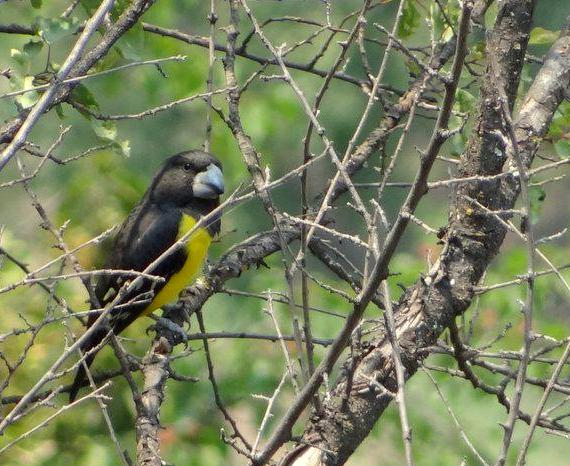
Spot-winged grosbeak

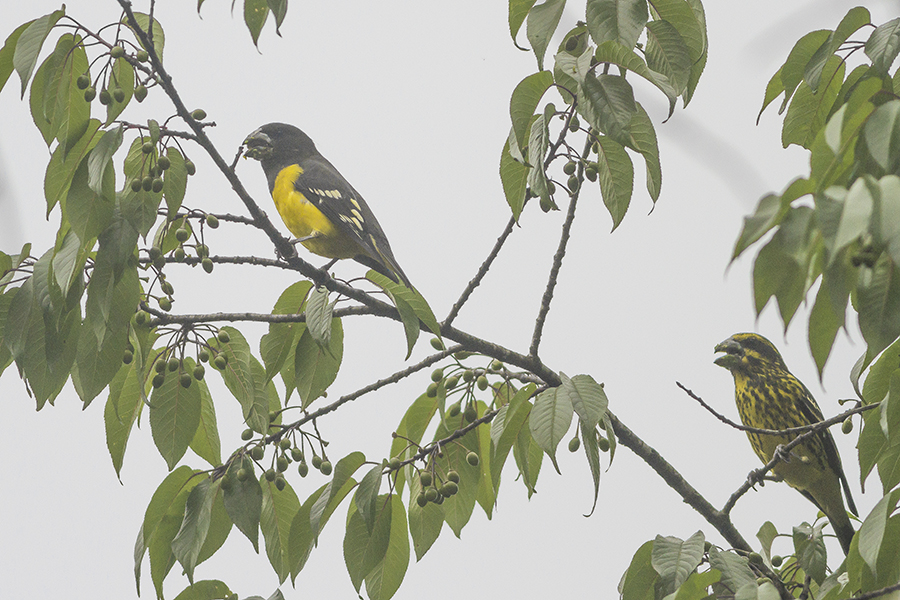
Male and female of the species from Khangchendzonga National Park, East Sikkim, India.

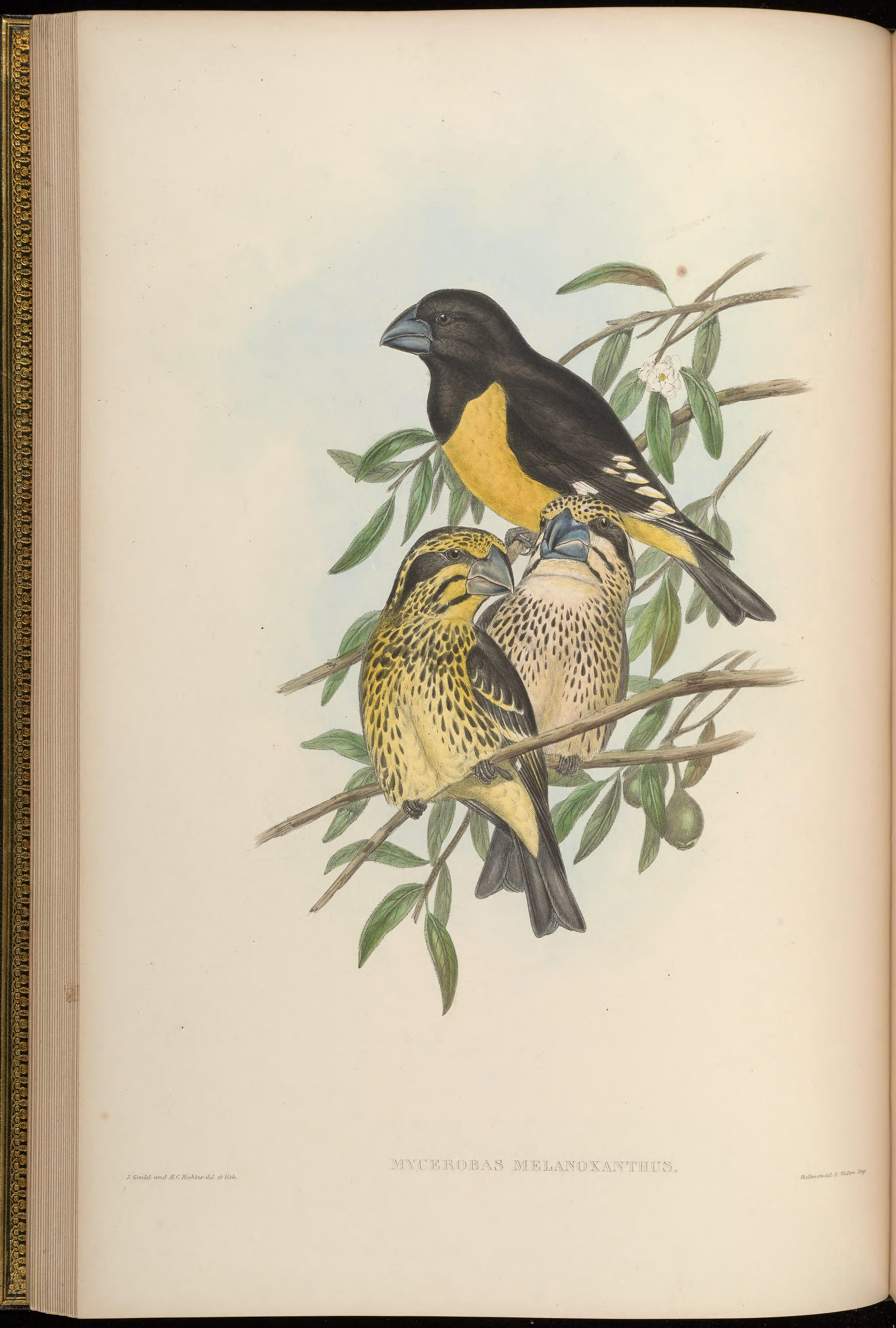
An artist's illustration.

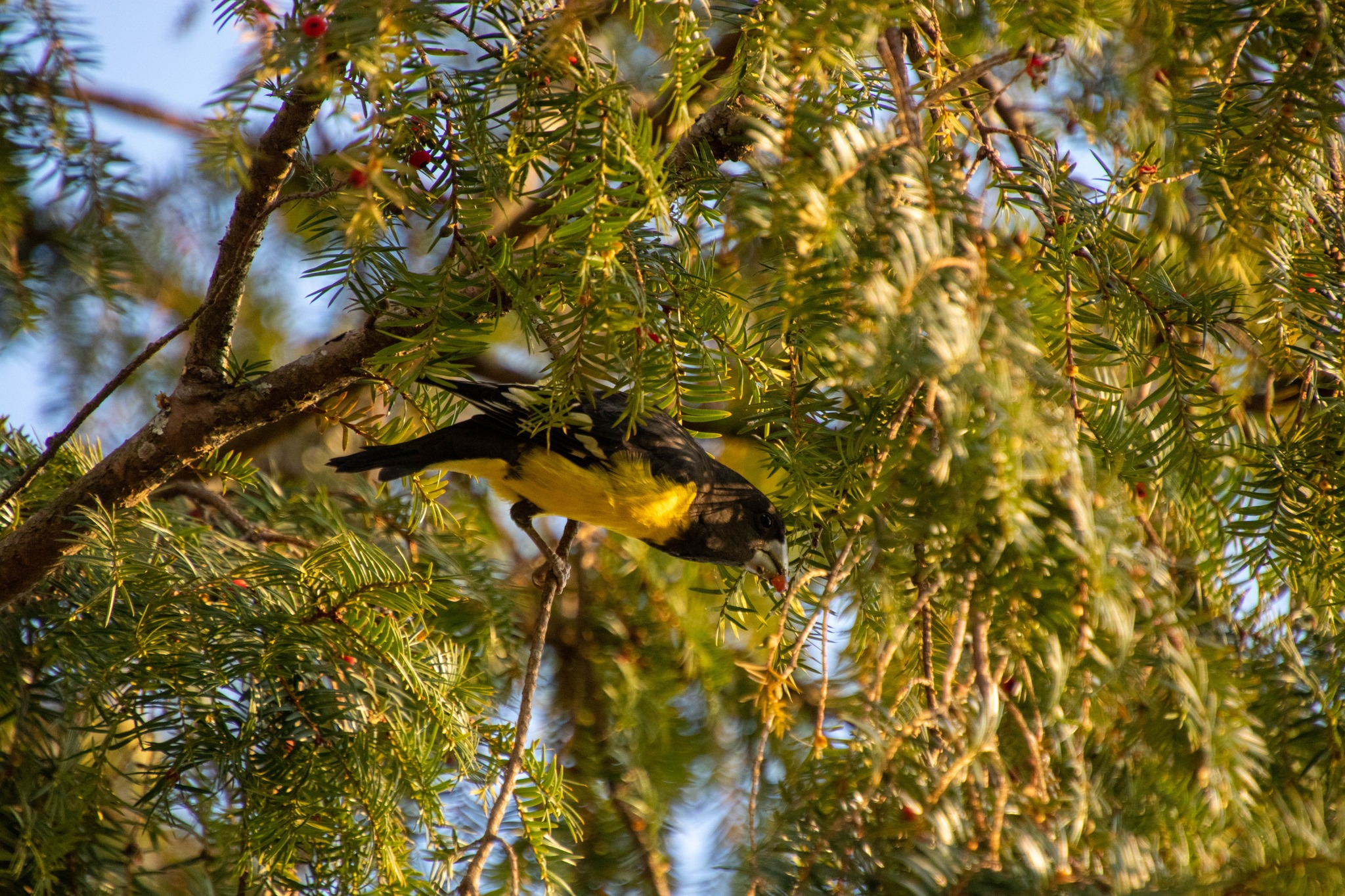
At Sermathang, Sindhupalchowk, Nepal.
