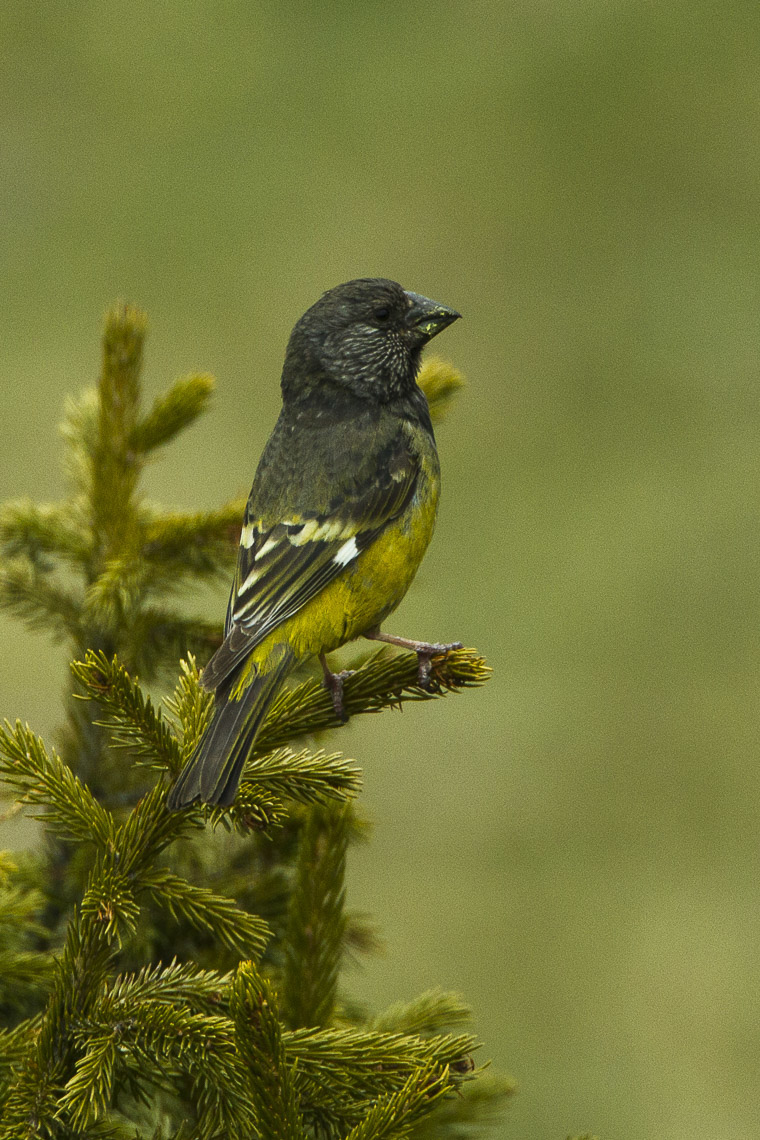

Conservation status
- Least Concern (IUCN 3.1)

Scientific classification
- Kingdom: Animalia
- Phylum: Chordata
- Class: Aves
- Order: Passeriformes
- Family: Fringillidae
- Subfamily: Carduelinae
- Genus: Mycerobas
- Species: M. carnipes

Binomial name
- Mycerobas carnipes (Hodgson, 1836)

= White-winged grosbeak =

Species of bird

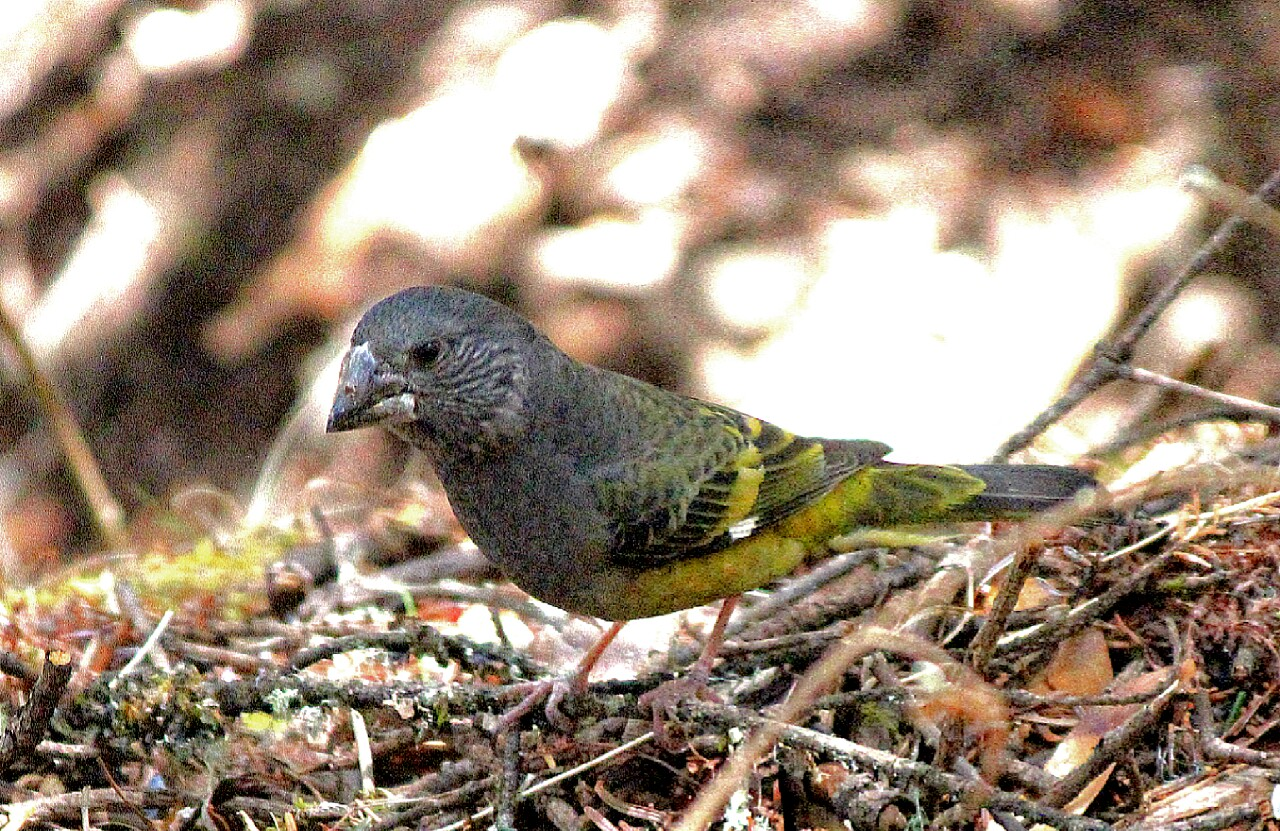
White winged gros beak near Phortse Tanga at Sagarmatha National Park area.

The white-winged grosbeak (Mycerobas carnipes) is a species of finch in the family Fringillidae.

It is found in Afghanistan, Bhutan, China, India, Iran, Myanmar, Nepal, Pakistan, Russia, Tajikistan, Turkmenistan, and Uzbekistan. Its natural habitat is boreal forests.
