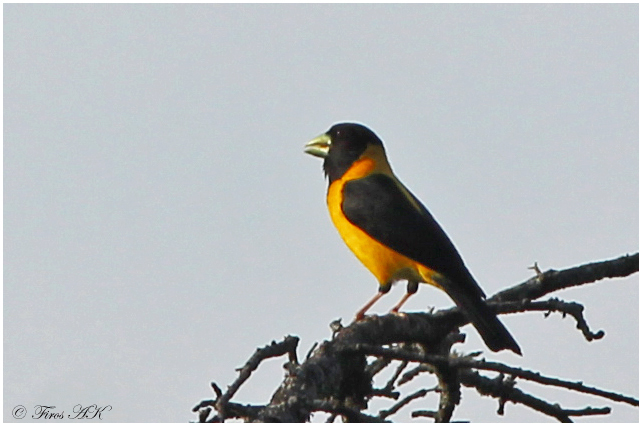
- Male
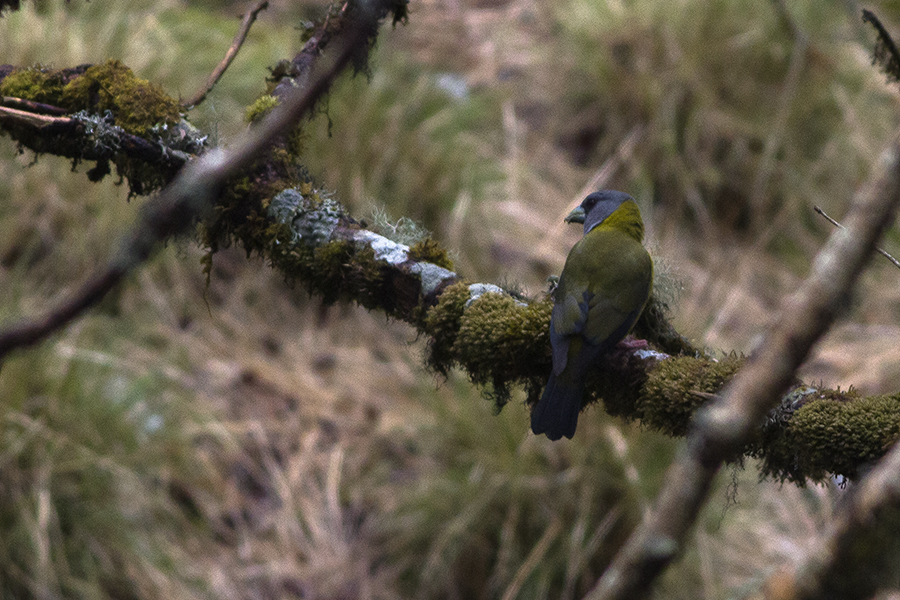
- Female

Conservation status
- Least Concern (IUCN 3.1)

Scientific classification
- Kingdom: Animalia
- Phylum: Chordata
- Class: Aves
- Order: Passeriformes
- Family: Fringillidae
- Subfamily: Carduelinae
- Genus: Mycerobas
- Species: M. affinis

Binomial name
- Mycerobas affinis (Blyth, 1855)

= Collared grosbeak =

Species of bird

The collared grosbeak (Mycerobas affinis) is a species of finch in the family Fringillidae. Its range encompasses the northern regions of the Indian subcontinent, mainly the Himalayas, along with some adjoining regions. It is found in Bhutan, India, Myanmar, Nepal and Thailand. Its natural habitat is mountainous deciduous or mixed forests.

== Description ==
The collared grosbeak may be the largest species in the diverse finch family, but several other species, including others in the genus Mycerobas, may rival it in size. The species can range in length from 22 to 24 cm (8.7 to 9.4 in). The body mass of two males was reportedly 69 and 72 g (2.4 and 2.5 oz), while a single female weighed 83 g (2.9 oz). Among standard measurements, the wing chord is 12.1 to 13.8 cm (4.8 to 5.4 in), the tail is 8.7 to 9.7 cm (3.4 to 3.8 in), the bill is 2.7 to 2.9 cm (1.1 to 1.1 in) and the tarsus is 2.6 to 2.9 cm (1.0 to 1.1 in). Adult males are glossy black on the head, upper-wings and tail. Contrasting with the black head, the collar is an earthy brownish color. The rest of the male's plumage is a rich, deep yellow. The female is olive-green on back and yellowish below with no black about the face. The juvenile birds are fairly similar in appearance to the adult female.

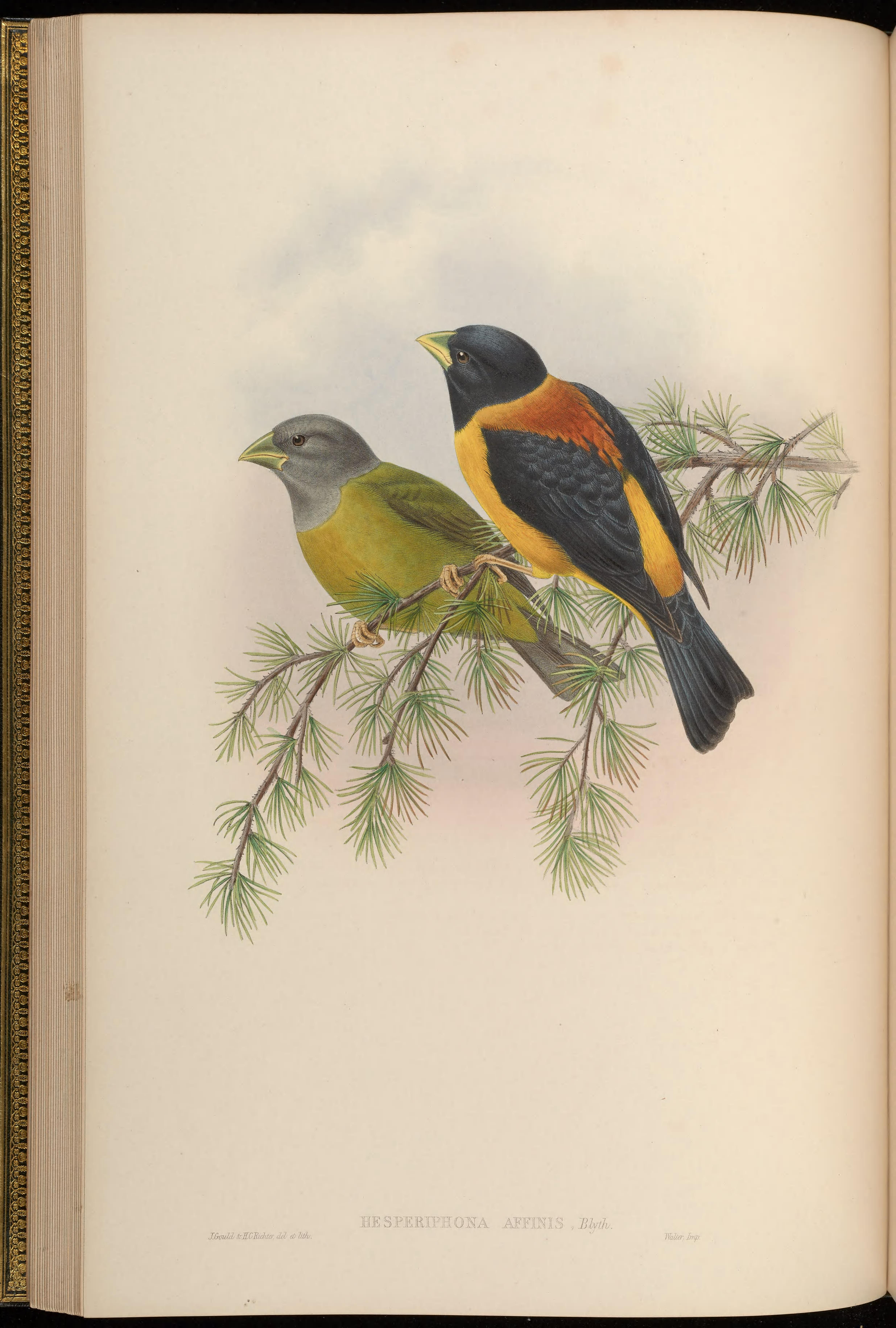
John Gould's illustration.

The flight call of this bird is a mellow but rapid Pip-pip-pip-pip-uh. It is also known to utter a sharp alarm call, kurr. The male's song is a clear, loud and rising whistle consisting of five to six notes. The grosbeaks may utter a creaky groan in antagonistic interactions.

== Ecology ==
The collared grosbeak ranges from fairly common to scarce within its range. The species summers and breeds at an elevation of 2,700 to 4,200 m (8,900 to 13,800 ft). It engages in altitudinal movements, by winter traveling to as low as 1,800 m (5,900 ft) or even to 1,060 m (3,480 ft). This grosbeak occurs in mixed and coniferous forests, commonly around stands of maple, oak or rhododendron. It also may occur during the summer in dwarf juniper above the tree line in the mountains. Pairs or small parties usually perch near the tops of tall trees but forage often in lower vegetation or even on the ground. The collared grosbeak flies in tight flocks in a fast, direct but sometimes undulating flying style. The breeding behavior of this species is unknown. The grosbeak feeds on a variety of seeds and pine cones as well as buds or shoots, nuts, fruits (including crab apples). A variety of this tough plant life is plucked with the strong bill. It may also feed on insects, mainly caterpillars, as well as snails.
