= Mountain serin =

Mountain serin has been split into two species:

- Indonesian serin, Chrysocorythus estherae
- Mindanao serin, Chrysocorythus mindanensis
