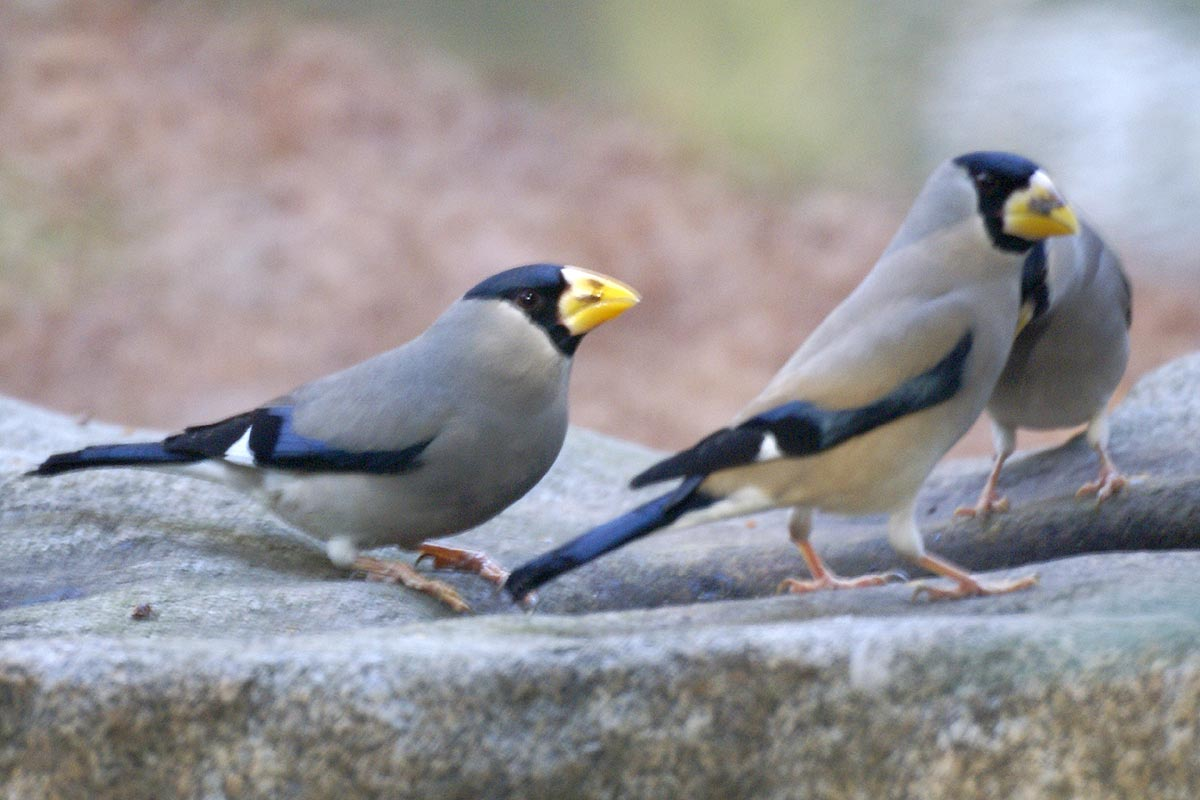
- Japanese grosbeak (Eophona personata)

Scientific classification
- Kingdom: Animalia
- Phylum: Chordata
- Class: Aves
- Order: Passeriformes
- Parvorder: Passerida
- Family: Fringillidae
- Subfamily: Carduelinae
- Genus: Eophona; Gould, 1851

Type species
- Loxia melanura Gmelin, 1789

Species
- See text.

= Eophona =

Genus of birds

The Oriental grosbeaks (Eophona) are a genus of finches containing two species: The genus was introduced in 1851 by the English ornithologist and bird artist John Gould. The name Eophona is derived from the classical Greek words ēōs meaning "dawn" and phōnē meaning "shout" or "cry".

The genus contains the following two species:

Genus Eophona – Gould, 1851 – two species
Common name	Scientific name and subspecies	Range	Size and ecology	IUCN status and estimated population
Chinese grosbeak	Eophona migratoria Hartert, 1903 Six subspecies: E. m. migratoria (Eastern Siberia, Manchuria and Korea); E. m. sowerbyi( East-central China)	China, Manchuria and Korea	Size: Habitat: Diet:	LC
Japanese grosbeak	Eophona personata (Temminck & Schlegel, 1847)	Japan from Hokkaido to Kyushu	Size: Habitat: Diet:	LC
