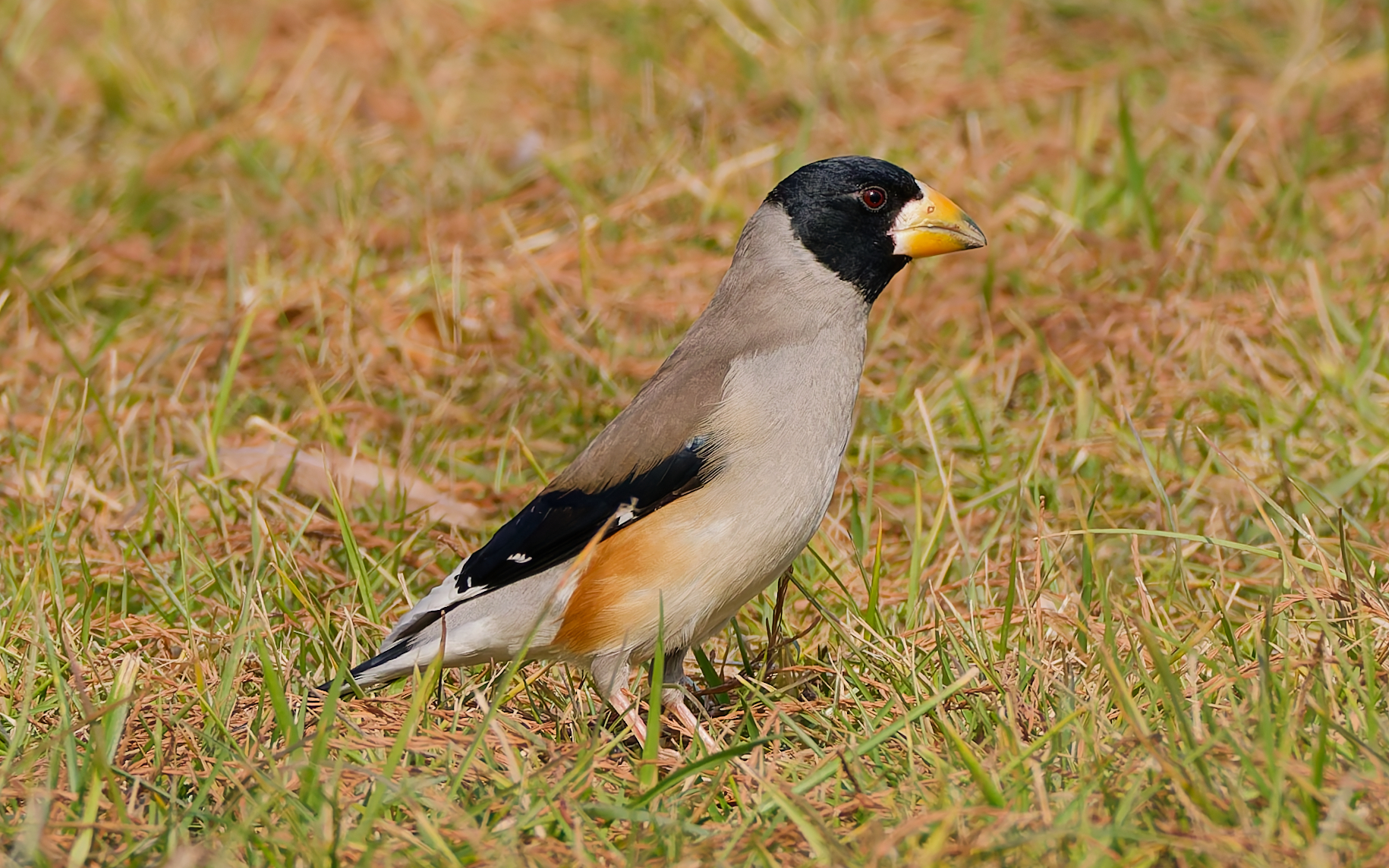
- Chinese Grosbeak in China

Conservation status
- Least Concern (IUCN 3.1)

Scientific classification
- Kingdom: Animalia
- Phylum: Chordata
- Class: Aves
- Order: Passeriformes
- Family: Fringillidae
- Subfamily: Carduelinae
- Genus: Eophona
- Species: E. migratoria

Binomial name
- Eophona migratoria Hartert, 1903

Synonyms
- Coccothraustes migratorius (Hartert, 1903)

= Chinese grosbeak =

Species of bird

The Chinese grosbeak, yellow-billed grosbeak, or black-tailed hawfinch (Eophona migratoria) is a species of finch in the family Fringillidae.

== Taxonomy ==
Subspecies include:

- Eophona migratoria migratoria (Eastern Siberia, Manchuria and Korea);
- Eophona migratoria sowerbyi( East-central China)

== Distribution and habitat ==
This species is present in Russian Far East, China, Manchuria and Korea. It occurs in forests, mixed woods and bamboo forests of hilly and mountainous areas: it does not fear humans and also goes into gardens and orchards.

== Description ==
Eophona migratoria measures between eighteen and twenty centimeters in length, for a wingspan of 23–24 cm and a weight of 55-60 g. The appearance is massive, as is typical of the finches, with a large head. The beak is very strong and conical. The beak color is yellow (hence the common name of "yellow-billed grosbeak") with a black tip. The body is of a uniform gray color, darker on the back and wings and lighter and tending to silver on the belly, with accentuated brown shades on the sides. The wings are black with a rounded white spot on the tip. The tail is black, the legs of pale flesh color and the eyes are brown. Sexual dimorphism is present. The head mask is gray in the female and not black as in the male.

== Biology ==
Eophona migratoria breeds in temperate forests and winters in southern parts of China and Japan, Taiwan and northern Southeast Asia.The nest is cup-shaped and is built by the female among the trees, in the thickest vegetation: inside it usually lays 4 bluish eggs with brown spots, which it hatches alone (with the male who provides it with food) to 12–13 days. The young are fed by both parents and are able to fly around at 12–14 days of age, however they tend to stay with their parents for another 2–3 weeks. Outside the breeding season, this bird tends to live in small groups of about ten individuals, which move among the trees in search of food, rarely going down to the ground. These birds are granivorous, mainly feeding on seeds that they break without problems thanks to the strong and robust beak:. They can feed without problems on other material of vegetable origin (sprouts, berries, fruit), while it is rare to observe them eating food of animal origin (mainly insects).

== Gallery ==
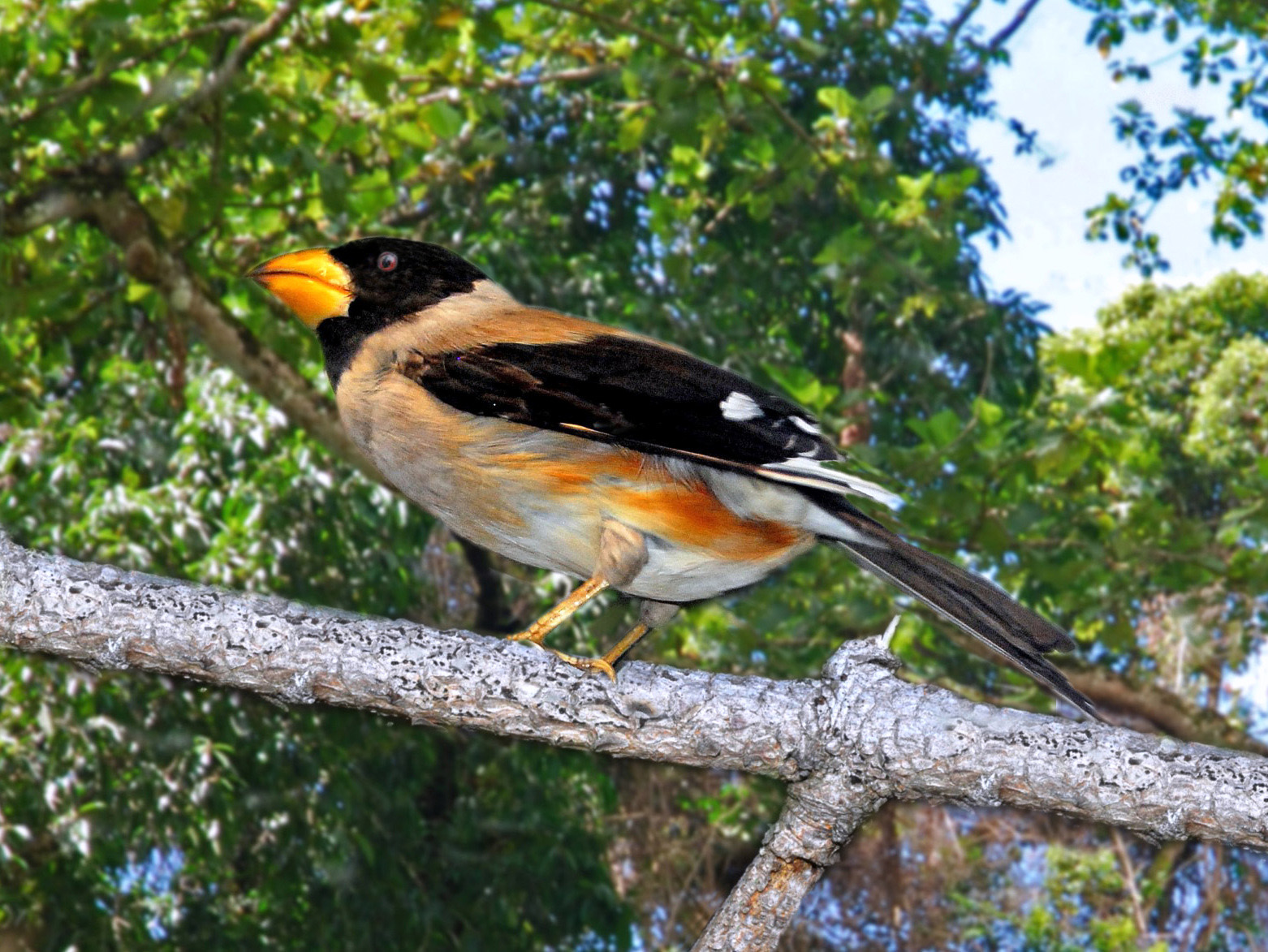
Eophona migratoria. Male

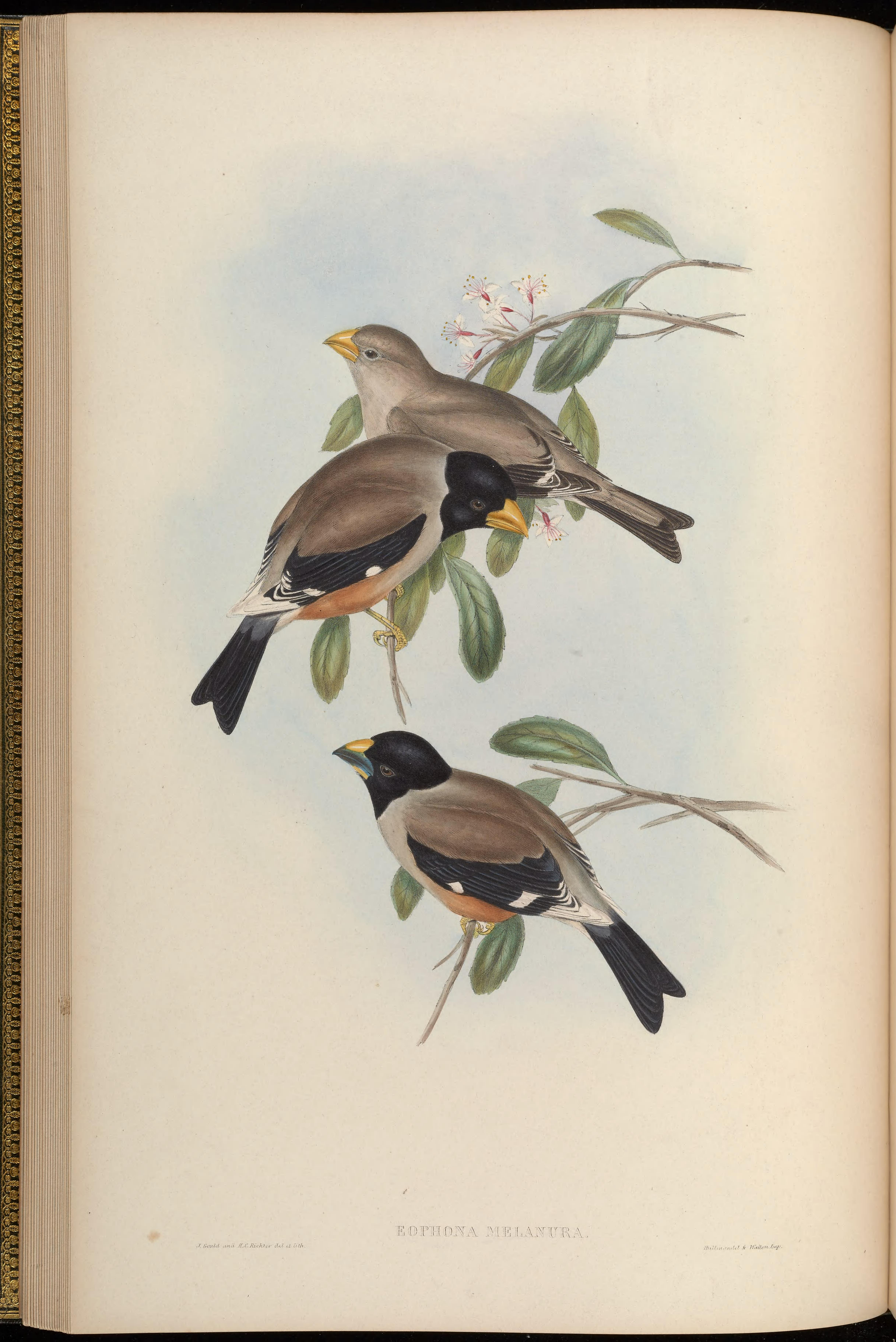
Illustration of Gould, John, 1804-1881 in Birds of Asia

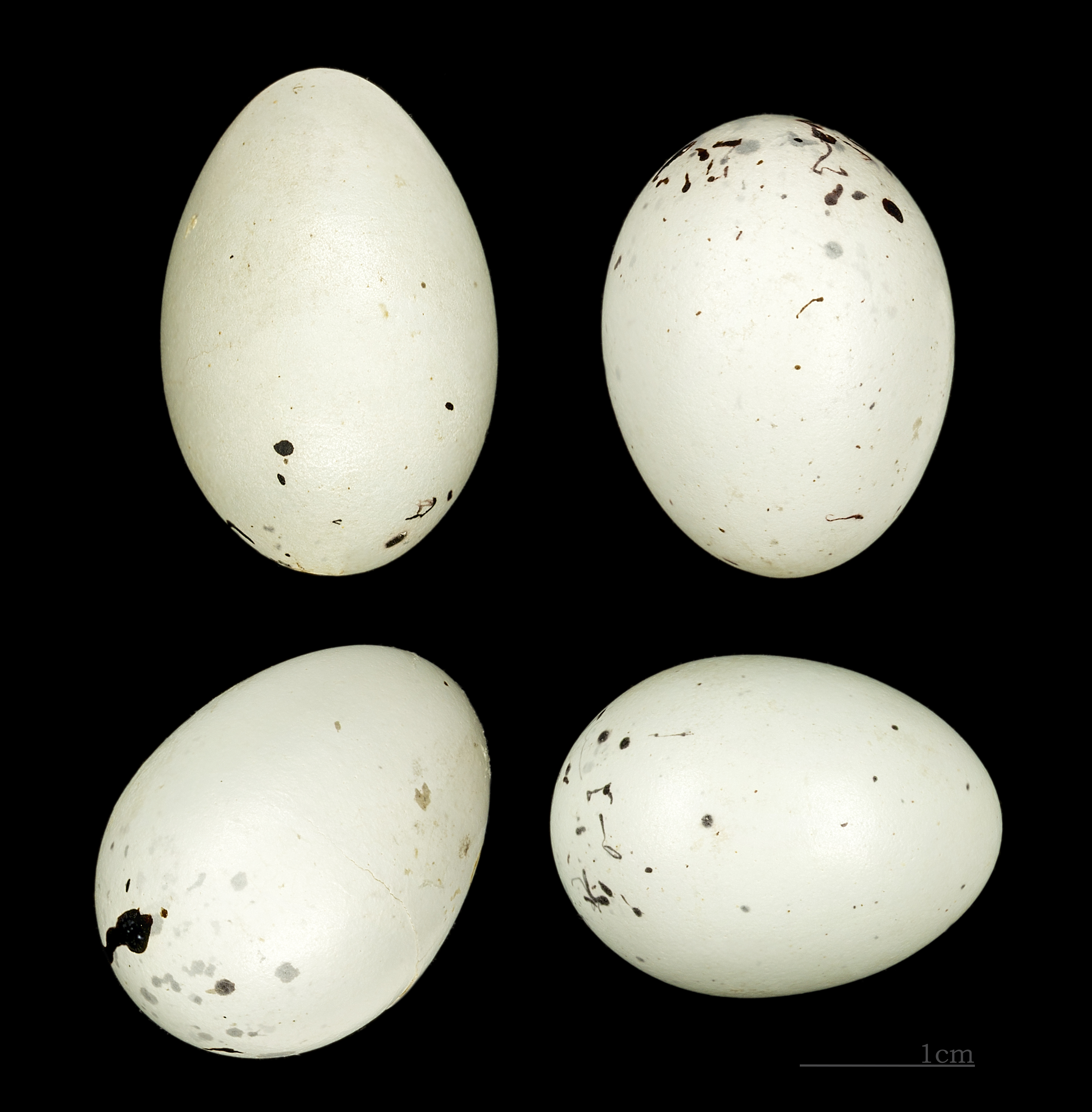
Eggs of Eophona migratoria

== Bibliography ==
- Horst Bielfeld: Zeisige, Girlitze, Gimpel und Kernbeißer. Verlag Eugen Ulmer, Stuttgart 2003, ISBN 3-8001-3675-9.
- Melville, D. S. (1992). Feeding of Black-tailed Hawfinch. Hong Kong Bird Report 1992: 192-193.
- Ottaviani, M. (2008) Monographie des Fringilles (fringillinés – carduélinés) – Histoire Naturelle et photographies, Volume 1. Editions Prin, Ingré, France, 488 p.
- This article has been expanded using, inter alia, material based on a translation of an article from the Italian Wikipedia, by the same name.
