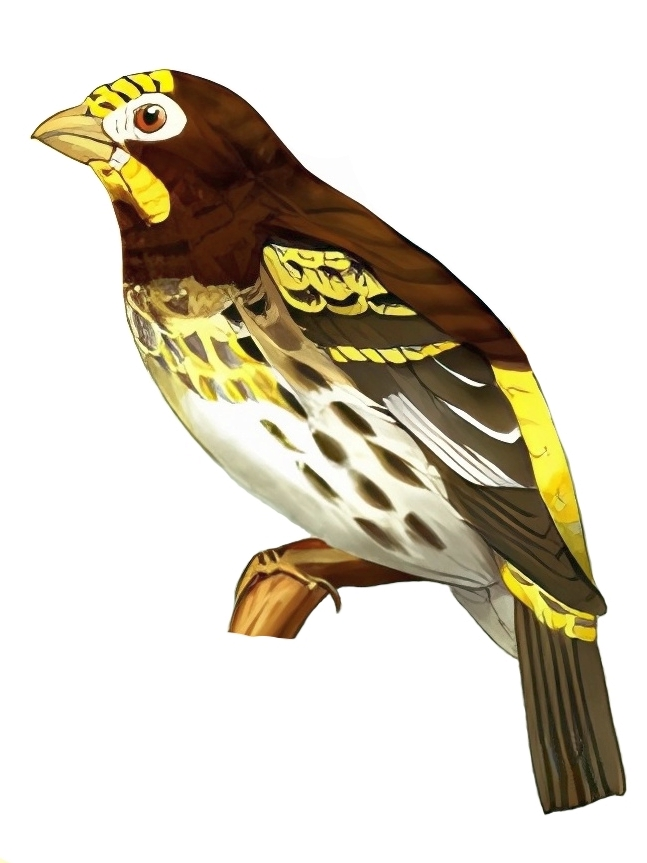

Conservation status
- Least Concern (IUCN 3.1)

Scientific classification
- Kingdom: Animalia
- Phylum: Chordata
- Class: Aves
- Order: Passeriformes
- Family: Fringillidae
- Subfamily: Carduelinae
- Genus: Chrysocorythus
- Species: C. estherae

Binomial name
- Chrysocorythus estherae (Finsch, 1902)

Synonyms
- Crithagra Estherae Finsch, 1902

= Indonesian serin =

Species of bird

The Indonesian serin (Chrysocorythus estherae) is a species of finch in the family Fringillidae.

It is found in Indonesia. Its natural habitats are subtropical or tropical moist montane forest and subtropical or tropical high-altitude grassland.

The Indonesian serin was formerly placed in the genus Serinus but a phylogenetic analysis of mitochondrial DNA sequences found that the species was not closely related to other member of Serinus nor to the geographically nearest finch, the Vietnamese greenfinch but to the European Goldfinch Carduelis carduelis and to the Citril Finch Carduelis citrinella. The species was therefore assigned to a separate genus Chrysocorythus, a name that had previously been proposed by the German ornithologist Hans Edmund Wolters in 1967.

The Mindanao serin (C. mindanensis) of Mindanao was formerly considered conspecific, together called the mountain serin, but was split as a distinct species by the IOC in 2021.

The Indonesian serin is polytypic with four subspecies, including the nominate subspecies of western Java. The other races include:

- Chrysocorythus estherae vanderbilti (Meyer de Schauensee, 1939) (including Serinus estherae ripleyi Chasen, 1939). Sumatra.
- Chrysocorythus estherae orientalis (Chasen, 1940) (including the replacement name Serinus estherae chaseni). Tengger range, eastern Java.
- Chrysocorythus estherae renatae (Schuchmann & Wolters, 1982). Mount Rantekombola, Sulawesi.

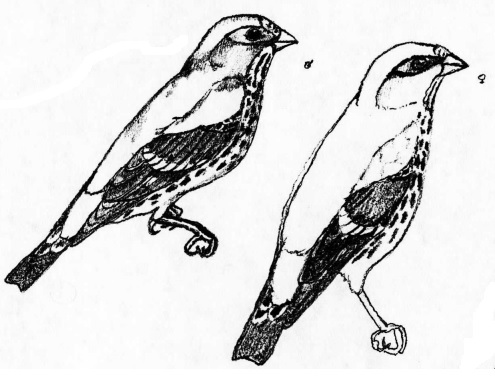
Indonesian serin, Chrysocorythus estherae.

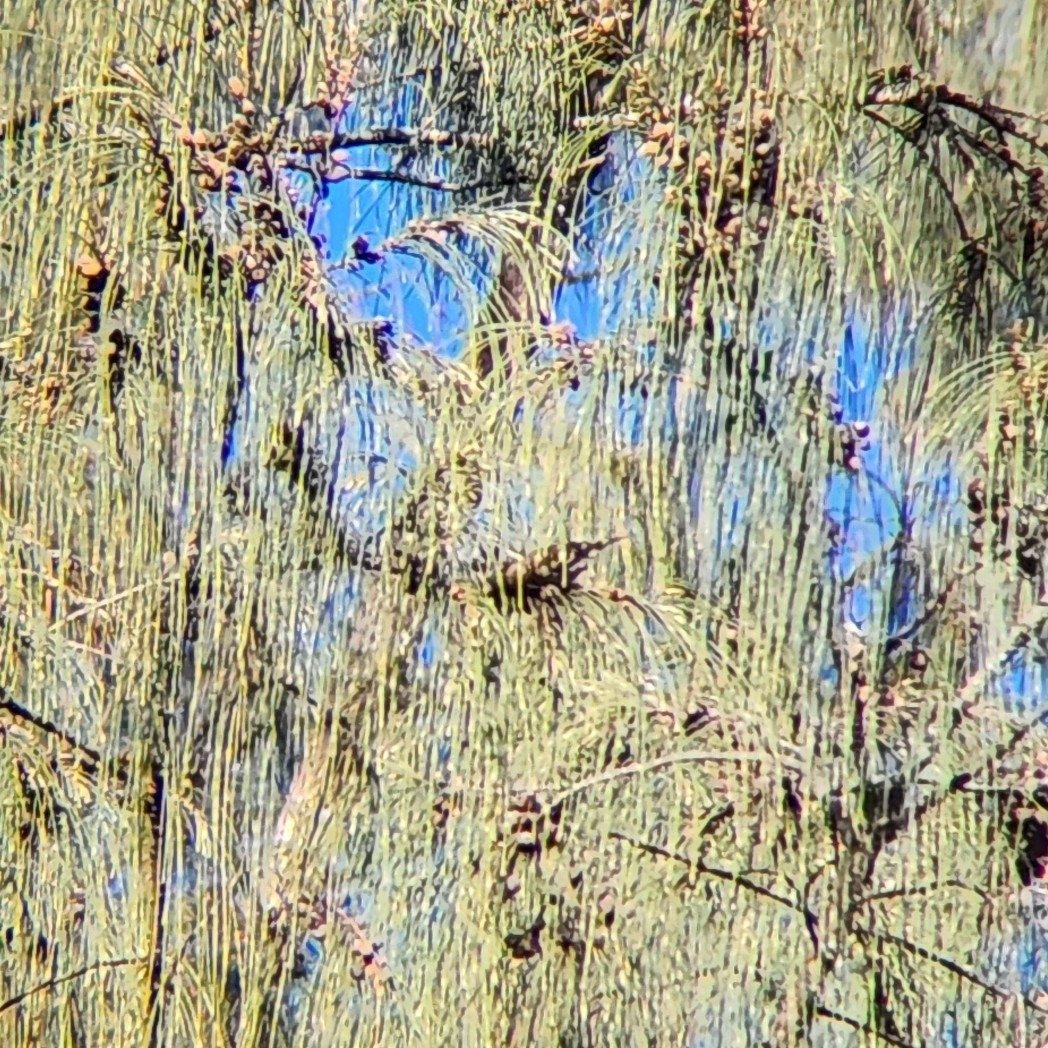
Live bird near Surakarta

There are also outstanding records of an unusual taxon of this species in Lore Lindu National Park, northern Central Sulawesi.
