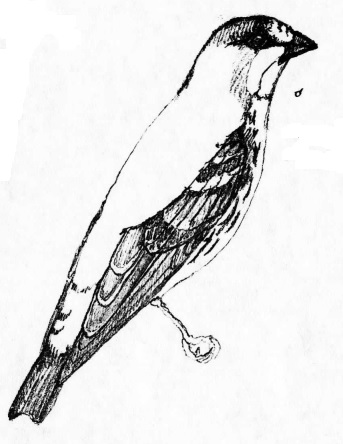

Conservation status
- Near Threatened (IUCN 3.1)

Scientific classification
- Kingdom: Animalia
- Phylum: Chordata
- Class: Aves
- Order: Passeriformes
- Family: Fringillidae
- Subfamily: Carduelinae
- Genus: Chrysocorythus
- Species: C. mindanensis

Binomial name
- Chrysocorythus mindanensis (Ripley & Rabor, 1961)

= Mindanao serin =

Species of bird

The Mindanao serin (Chrysocorythus mindanensis) is a species of finch in the family Fringillidae.

It is found in the Philippines in the areas of Mount Katanglad and Mount Apo. Its natural habitats are tropical moist montane forest and tropical high-altitude grassland above 2,000 meters above sea level. Among Mindanao endemic birds, it is the least known with only 1 known photograph of a live specimen in 2012.

== Description and taxonomy ==
The Mindanao Serin was first described by S. Dillon Ripley and D. S. Rabor from an adult male collected in 1960 by R. B. Gonzales. The original description also includes a color illustration by Robert Verity Clem, and the type is located in the Yale Peabody Museum.

The Mindanao serin was formerly considered conspecific with the Indonesian serin (Chrysocorythus estherae), together called the mountain serin, but was split as a distinct species by the IOC in 2021. It is differentiated from the Indonesia serin as its plumage has a larger extent of yellow, it has the darker streaks, a more blunt bill, dark eye-ring and its more stout appearance.

== Ecology and behavior ==
Diet is completely unknown but believed to feed on seeds and small fruits. Its assumed to forage down low in the bushes and vegetation alone or in small groups. Nothing is known about its breeding habits.

== Habitat and conservation status ==
It occupies montane mossy forest and forest edge from typically above 2,000 meters above sea level but has been found as low as 1,500 meters above sea level.

IUCN previously assessed this bird as near threatened but was downlisted to Least-concern species. Its population was previously estimated at 1,000 to 2,500 mature individuals but there are so few records of this bird that it's difficult to identify its true rarity this estimate was changed to unknown. As it is only confined to the highest reaches of Mount Apo and Kitanglad, its range is estimated at just 4,300sq km but believed to be secure due to its remoteness. However, due to its high altitude requirement, it may be possibly affected by climate change.
