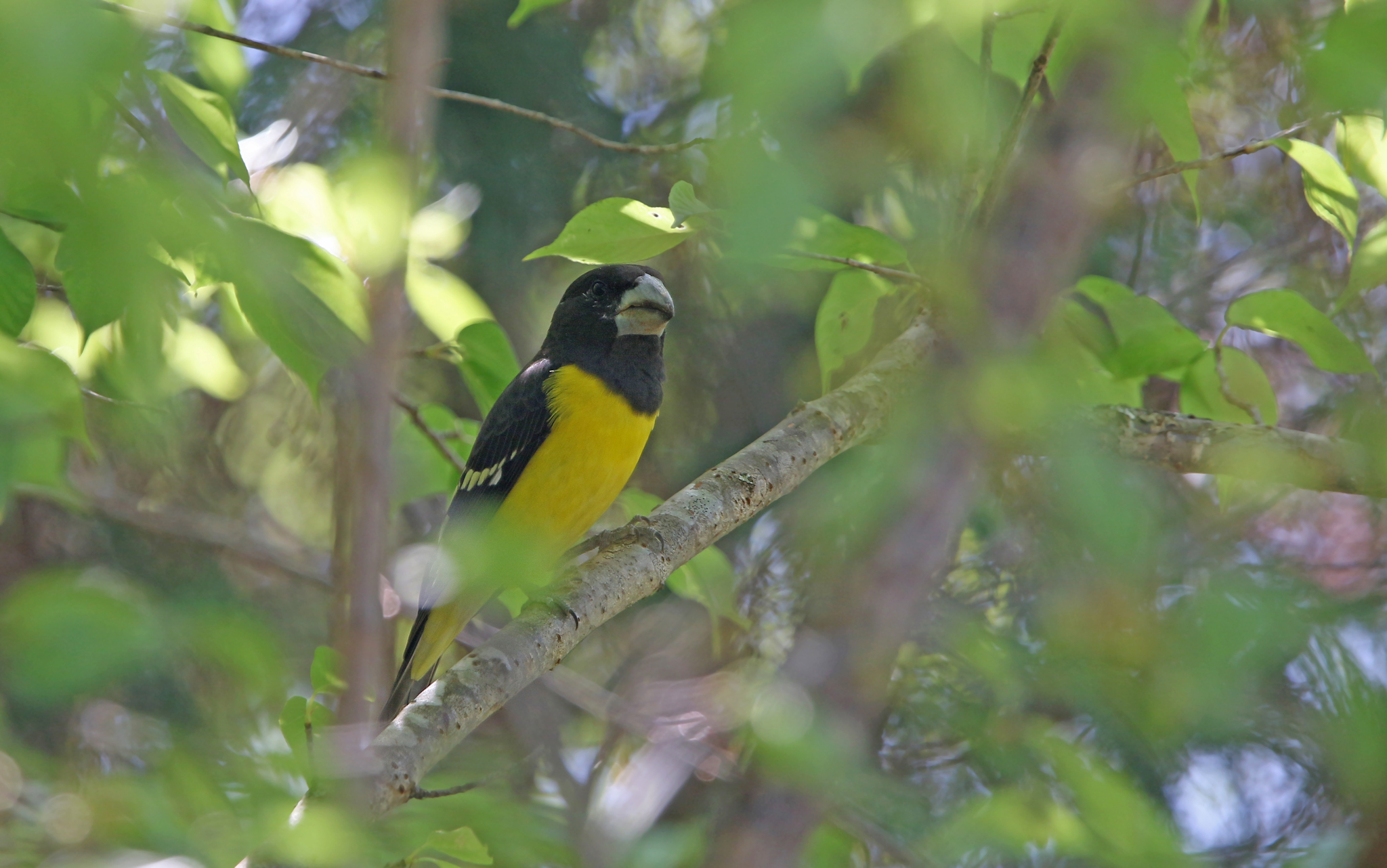
- Male spot-winged grosbeak (M. melanozanthos)

Scientific classification
- Kingdom: Animalia
- Phylum: Chordata
- Class: Aves
- Order: Passeriformes
- Family: Fringillidae
- Subfamily: Carduelinae
- Genus: Mycerobas; Cabanis, 1847

Type species
- Coccothraustes melanozanthos Hodgson, 1836

= Mycerobas =

Genus of birds

The Mycerobas grosbeaks are a genus of finch in the family Fringillidae. They are colorful and are at 20–23 cm the largest species in the family. They are found in the southern Himalayas and across into China. The genus contains the following four species:

Image	Scientific name	Common name	Distribution
	Mycerobas affinis	Collared grosbeak	Bhutan, India, Myanmar, Nepal and Thailand
	Mycerobas carnipes	White-winged grosbeak	Afghanistan, Bhutan, China, India, Iran, Myanmar, Nepal, Pakistan, Russia, Tajikistan, Turkmenistan, and Uzbekistan
	Mycerobas icterioides	Black-and-yellow grosbeak	Indian subcontinent
	Mycerobas melanozanthos	Spot-winged grosbeak	Bhutan, India, Laos, Myanmar, Nepal, Pakistan, Thailand, Tibet and Vietnam
