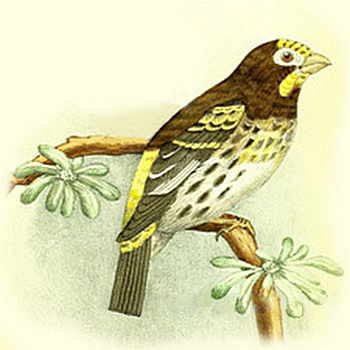
- Indonesian serin

Scientific classification
- Kingdom: Animalia
- Phylum: Chordata
- Class: Aves
- Order: Passeriformes
- Family: Fringillidae
- Subfamily: Carduelinae
- Genus: Chrysocorythus; Wolters, 1967

Type species
- Serinus mindanensis Ripley & Rabor, 1961

= Chrysocorythus =

Genus of birds

Chrysocorythus is a genus of finches in the family Fringillidae.

It contains the following two species:

Image	Common name	Scientific name
	Indonesian serin	Chrysocorythus estherae
	Mindanao serin	Chrysocorythus mindanensis
