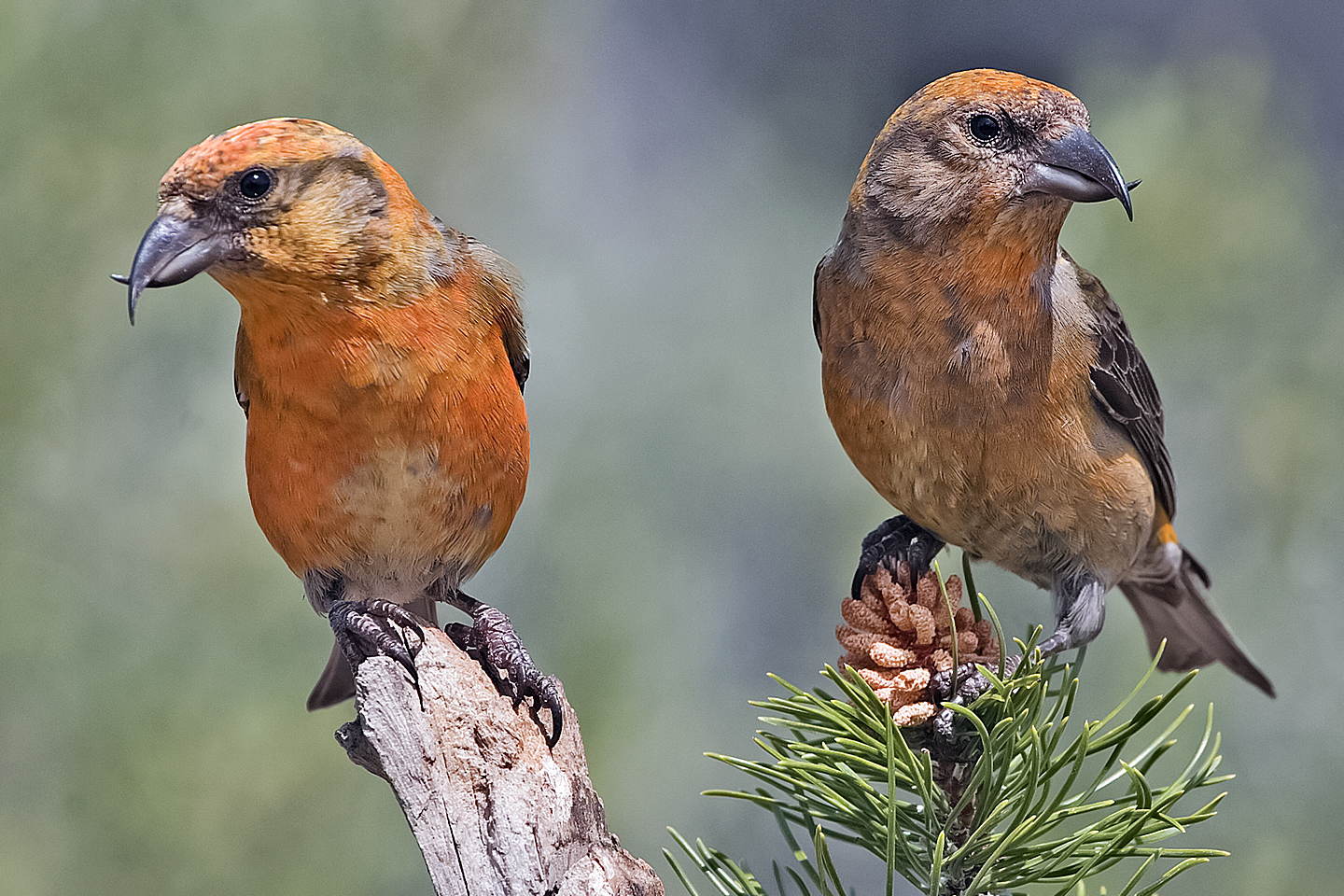
- Male red crossbills

Scientific classification
- Kingdom: Animalia
- Phylum: Chordata
- Class: Aves
- Order: Passeriformes
- Family: Fringillidae
- Subfamily: Carduelinae; Vigors, 1825

Genera
- 49, see text

= Carduelinae =

Subfamily of birds

The cardueline finches are a subfamily, Carduelinae, one of three subfamilies of the finch family Fringillidae, the others being the Fringillinae and the Euphoniinae. The Hawaiian honeycreepers are now included in this subfamily. Except for the Hawaiian honeycreepers which underwent adaptive radiation in Hawaii and have evolved a broad range of diets, cardueline finches are specialised seed eaters, and unlike most passerine birds, they feed their young mostly on seeds, which are regurgitated. Besides this, they differ from the other finches in some minor details of their skull. They are adept at opening seeds and clinging to stems, unlike other granivorous birds, such as sparrows and buntings, which feed mostly on fallen seeds. Some members of this subfamily are further specialised to feed on a particular type of seed, such as cones in the case of crossbills. Carduelines forage in flocks throughout the year, rather than keeping territories, and males defend their females rather than a territory or nest.

The name Carduelina[e] for the subfamily was introduced by the Irish zoologist Nicholas Aylward Vigors in 1825. Carduelinae is derived from the Latin name carduelis and the binomial name Carduelis carduelis for a goldfinch, one of the species in the subfamily.

== List of genera ==
The Carduelinae subfamily contains 186 species divided into 49 genera. Of the 186 species, 15 are now extinct; these are the Bonin grosbeak and 14 Hawaiian honeycreepers.

- Mycerobas – contains four species of Asian grosbeaks
- Hesperiphona – contains two species of American grosbeaks, the evening grosbeak and the hooded grosbeak
- Coccothraustes – contains a single species, the hawfinch
- Eophona – contains the two oriental grosbeaks, the Chinese and the Japanese grosbeak
- Pinicola – contains a single species, the pine grosbeak
- Pyrrhula – contains the eight bullfinch species
- Rhodopechys – contains a single species, the crimson-winged finch
- Bucanetes – contains two species, the trumpeter and the Mongolian finch
- Agraphospiza – contains a single species, Blanford's rosefinch
- Callacanthis – contains a single species, the spectacled finch
- Pyrrhoplectes – contains a single species, the golden-naped finch
- Procarduelis – contains a single species, the dark-breasted rosefinch
- Leucosticte – contains six species of mountain and rosy finches
- Carpodacus – contains the 28 species of Palearctic rosefinches
- Hawaiian honeycreeper group (formerly a separate family, Drepanididae, and sometimes treated as tribe Drepanini)
  - †Melamprosops – contains a single extinct species, the po'ouli
  - Paroreomyza – contains three species, the Oahu alauahio, the Maui alauahio and the extinct kakawahie
  - Oreomystis – contains a single species, the akikiki
  - Telespiza – contains two species, the Laysan finch and the Nihoa finch
  - Loxioides – contains a single species, the palila
  - †Rhodacanthis – contains two extinct species, the lesser and the greater koa finch
  - †Chloridops – contains a three extinct species
  - †Psittirostra – contains a single extinct species, the ou
  - †Dysmorodrepanis – contains a single extinct species, the Lanai hookbill
  - Drepanis – contains two extinct species, the Hawaii mamo and the black mamo, and the extant iiwi
  - †Ciridops – contains a single extinct species, the Ula-ai-hawane
  - Palmeria – contains a single species, the akohekohe
  - Himatione – contains two species, the apapane and the extinct Laysan honeycreeper
  - †Viridonia – contains a single extinct species, the greater amakihi
  - †Akialoa – contains six extinct species
  - Hemignathus – contains five species, only one of which is extant, with two being possibly extinct
  - Pseudonestor – contains a single species, the Maui parrotbill
  - Magumma – contains a single species, the anianiau
  - Loxops – contains five species, of which one is extinct and one possibly extinct
  - Chlorodrepanis – contains three species, the Hawaii, Oahu and Kauai amakihi
  - †Orthiospiza – contains a single extinct species, the highland finch
  - †Vangulifer – contains two extinct species
  - †Xestospiza – contains two extinct species
  - †Aidemedia – contains three extinct species
- Haemorhous – contains the three species of North America rosefinches
- Chloris – contains the six species of greenfinches
- Rhodospiza – contains a single species, the desert finch
- Rhynchostruthus – contains the three species of golden-winged grosbeaks
- Linurgus – contains a single species, the oriole finch
- Crithagra – contains 37 species of canaries, serins and siskins from Africa and the Arabian Peninsula
- Linaria – contains four species including the twite and three linnets
- Acanthis – redpolls
- Loxia – contains six species of crossbills
- Chrysocorythus – contains two species, the Indonesian serin and the Mindanao serin
- Carduelis – contains four species including the European goldfinch
- Serinus – contains eight species including the European serin
- Spinus – contains 20 species including the North American goldfinches and the Eurasian siskin

== Literature cited ==
- Groth, Jeffrey G. (2001). "Finches and Allies". In Elphick, Chris; Dunning, John B. Jr.; Sibley, David Allen (eds.). The Sibley Guide to Bird Life and Behavior. New York: Alfred A. Knopf. pp. 552–560. ISBN 978-1-4000-4386-6.
- Newton, Ian (1973). Finches. The New Naturalist Library 55. New York: Taplinger. ISBN 0-8008-2720-1.
