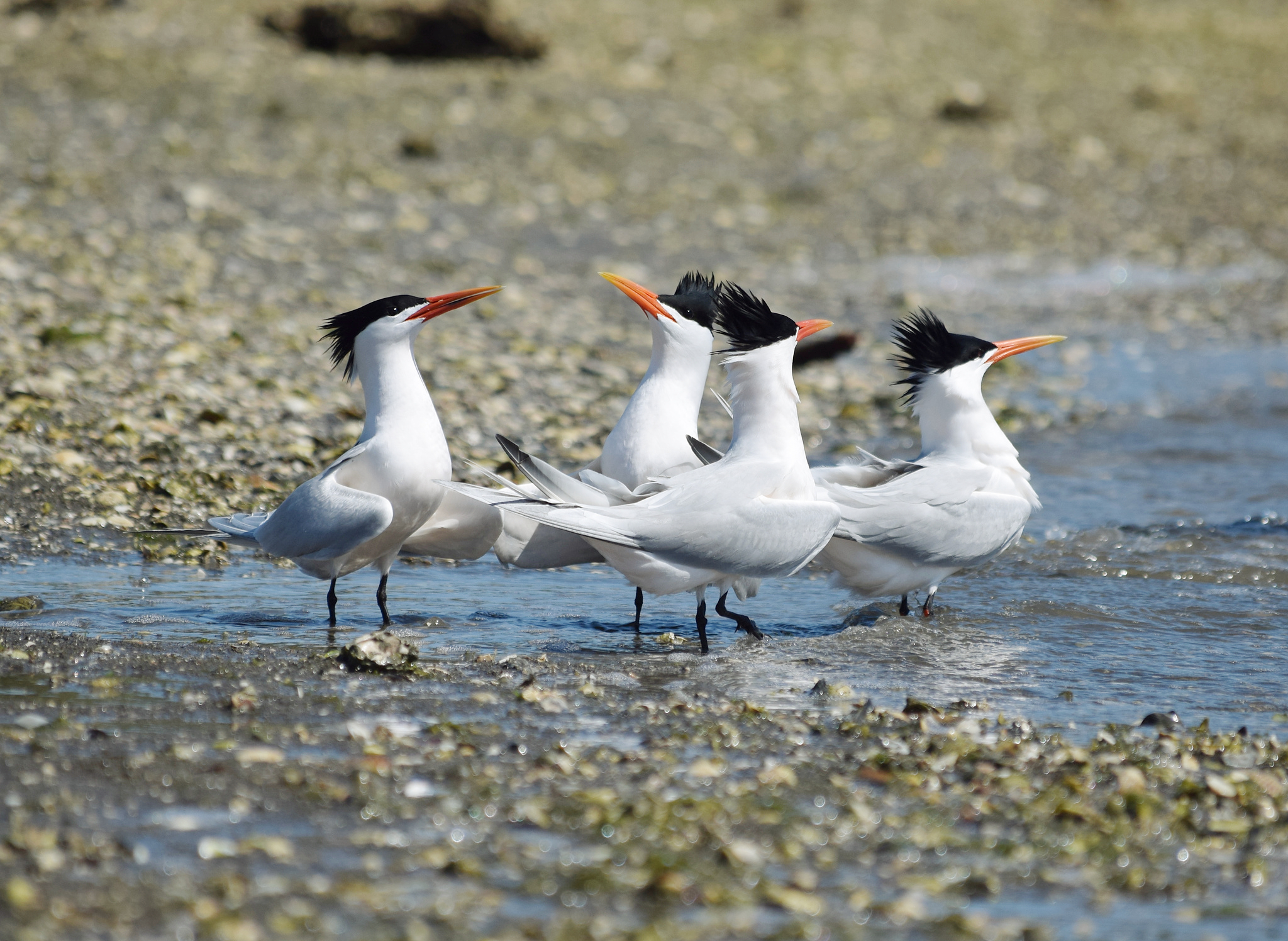
- Displaying birds at Upper Newport Bay, California

Conservation status
- Near Threatened (IUCN 3.1)

Scientific classification
- Kingdom: Animalia
- Phylum: Chordata
- Class: Aves
- Order: Charadriiformes
- Family: Laridae
- Genus: Thalasseus
- Species: T. elegans

Binomial name
- Thalasseus elegans (Gambel, 1849)

Synonyms
- Sterna elegans Gambel, 1849

= Elegant tern =

Species of bird

The elegant tern (Thalasseus elegans) is a tern in the family Laridae. It breeds on the Pacific coast of southern California in the United States and western Mexico, and migrates south to Peru, Ecuador and Chile for the northern winter; in the late summer and fall, some also disperse north to Oregon and more rarely Washington.

This species breeds in very dense colonies on coasts and islands, including Isla Rasa and Montague Island in Mexico, as well as South Bay Salt Works (San Diego) and Bolsa Chica Ecological Reserve in California. Exceptionally, vagrants can occur inland on suitable large freshwater lakes.

The elegant tern feeds by plunge-diving for fish, almost invariably from the sea, like most Thalasseus terns. It usually dives directly, and not from the "stepped-hover" favored by the Arctic tern. The offering of fish by the male to the female is part of the courtship display.

This Pacific species has wandered to western Europe as a rare vagrant on a number of occasions. The first European record was at Carlingford Lough in County Down, Northern Ireland, in late June 1982. It has nested in Spain, and has interbred with a Sandwich tern in France. There is also one record from Cape Town, South Africa, in January 2006, the first record for Africa.

== Taxonomy and etymology ==
The current genus name is derived from Greek Thalassa, "sea", and elegans is Latin for "elegant, fine". Though described in 1822, the genus was largely treated as a synonym of Sterna until a 2005 study demonstrated that the systematics of the terns needed review.

The closest relative of the elegant tern is Cabot's tern T. acuflavidus, which breeds on the Atlantic coasts of the Americas; this species pair is then next most closely related to the Old World Sandwich tern.

== Identification ==
This is a medium-large tern, with a long, slender, slightly downcurved orange bill, pale gray upperparts and white underparts. It is 39–42 cm (15–17 in) long with an 76–81 cm (30–32 in) wingspan, and a weight of 190–325 g (6.7–11.5 oz). Its legs are black. From late summer to winter, the forehead becomes white. The black of the crest that comes down from the crown extends through the eye, creating a small black "smudge" in front of the eye even in winter plumage. On royal terns, the black crest stops at the eye, while lesser crested tern has a less shaggy crest. Juvenile elegant terns have a scalier pale gray back. The call is a characteristic loud grating noise similar to other Thalasseus terns.

This bird can be confused with the royal tern, but that is larger and thicker-billed, and shows more white on the forehead in winter. Birds out of its normal range in Europe can also be easily confused with the lesser crested tern, but it differs from this in having a pure white (not gray) rump, in being marginally paler above, and with a slightly longer, more slender and slightly downcurved bill.

== Ecology and conservation ==
The total population is around 90,000 pairs, with the majority on islets in the Gulf of California. It nests in a ground scrape and lays one or two eggs. Unlike some of the smaller Sterna terns, it is not very aggressive toward potential predators, relying on the sheer density of the nests (often only 20–30 cm apart) and nesting close to other more aggressive species, such as Heermann's gulls, to avoid predation. However, Heermann's gulls do predate some eggs and chicks, though more significant predators are the much larger and more predatory western and yellow-footed gulls.

In May 2021, 1500 nests with thousands of eggs were abandoned when a drone crash landed near the nesting colony in Bolsa Chica Ecological Reserve, scaring off 2,500 nesting elegant terns and leading to a catastrophic loss.

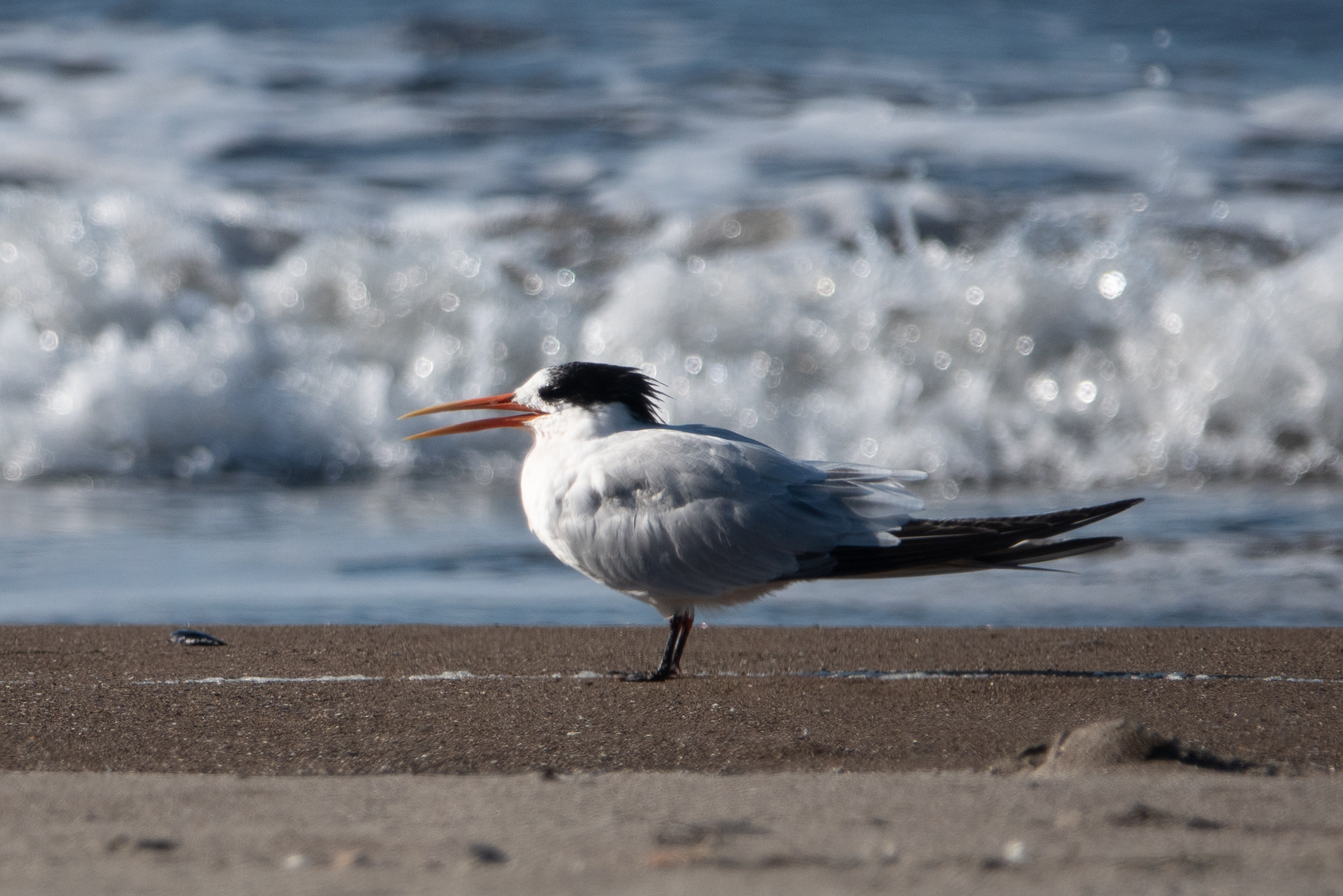
Winter plumage, Stinson Beach, California

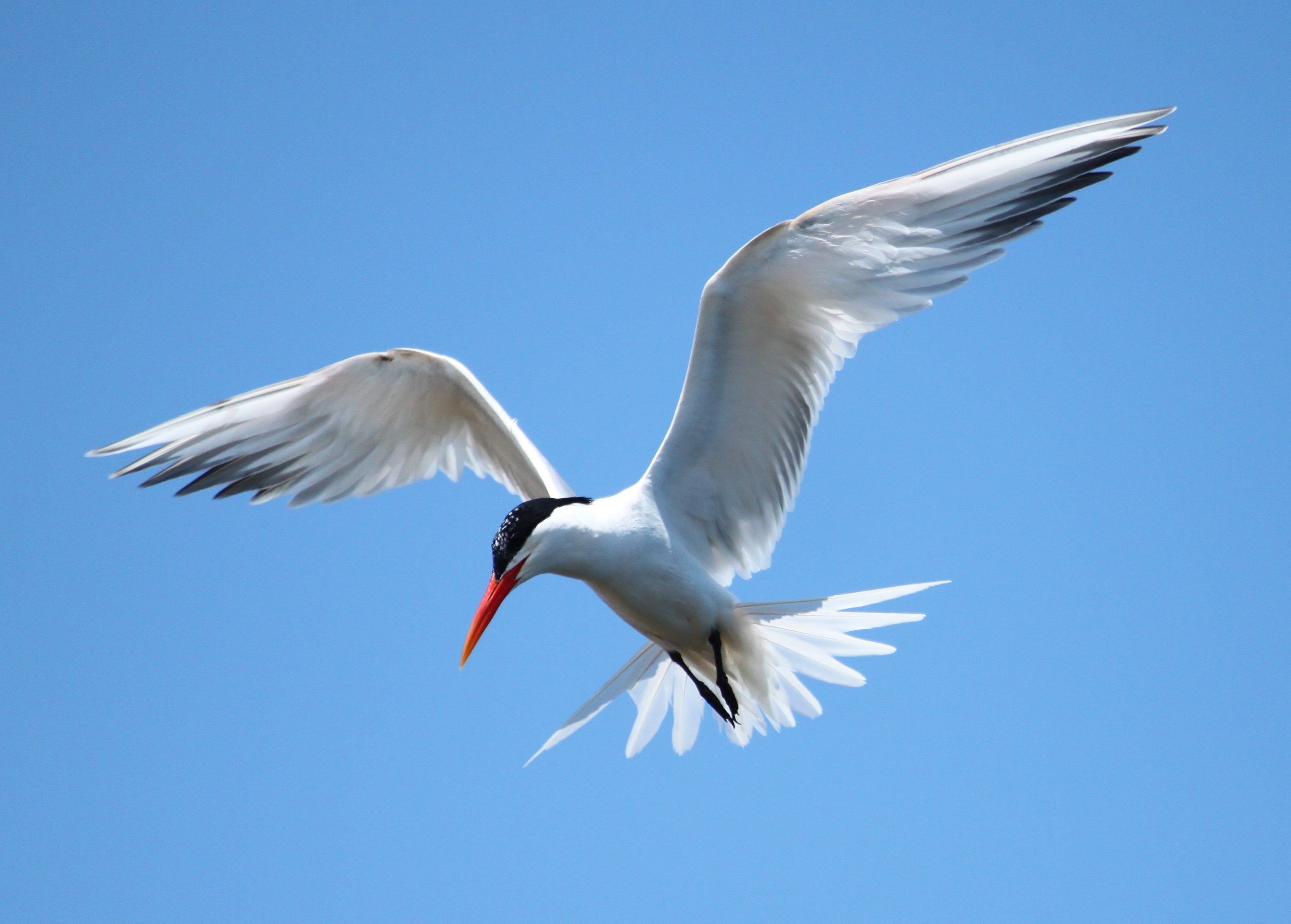
Fishing at Bolsa Chica Ecological Reserve, California

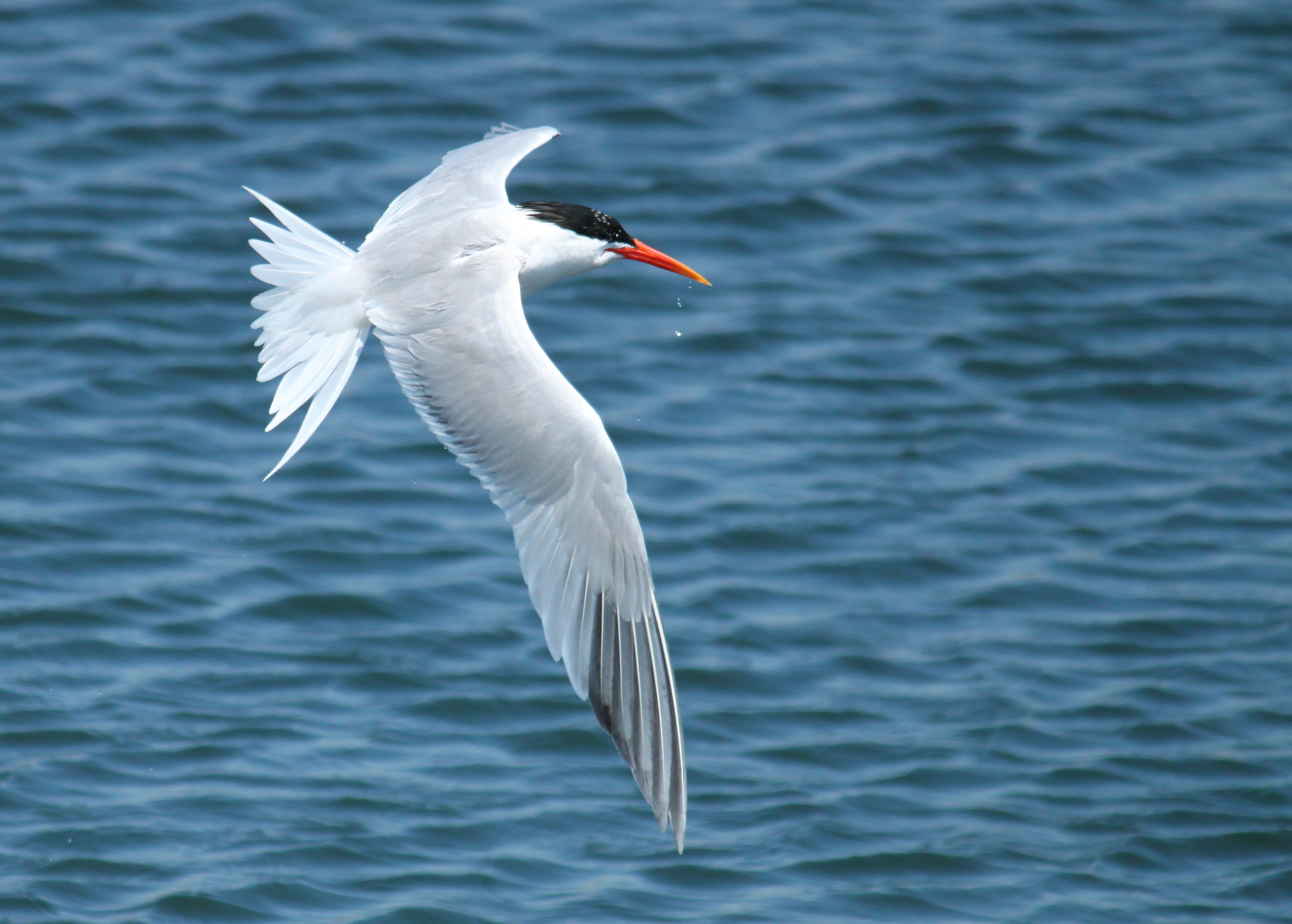
Bolsa Chica Ecological Reserve, California
