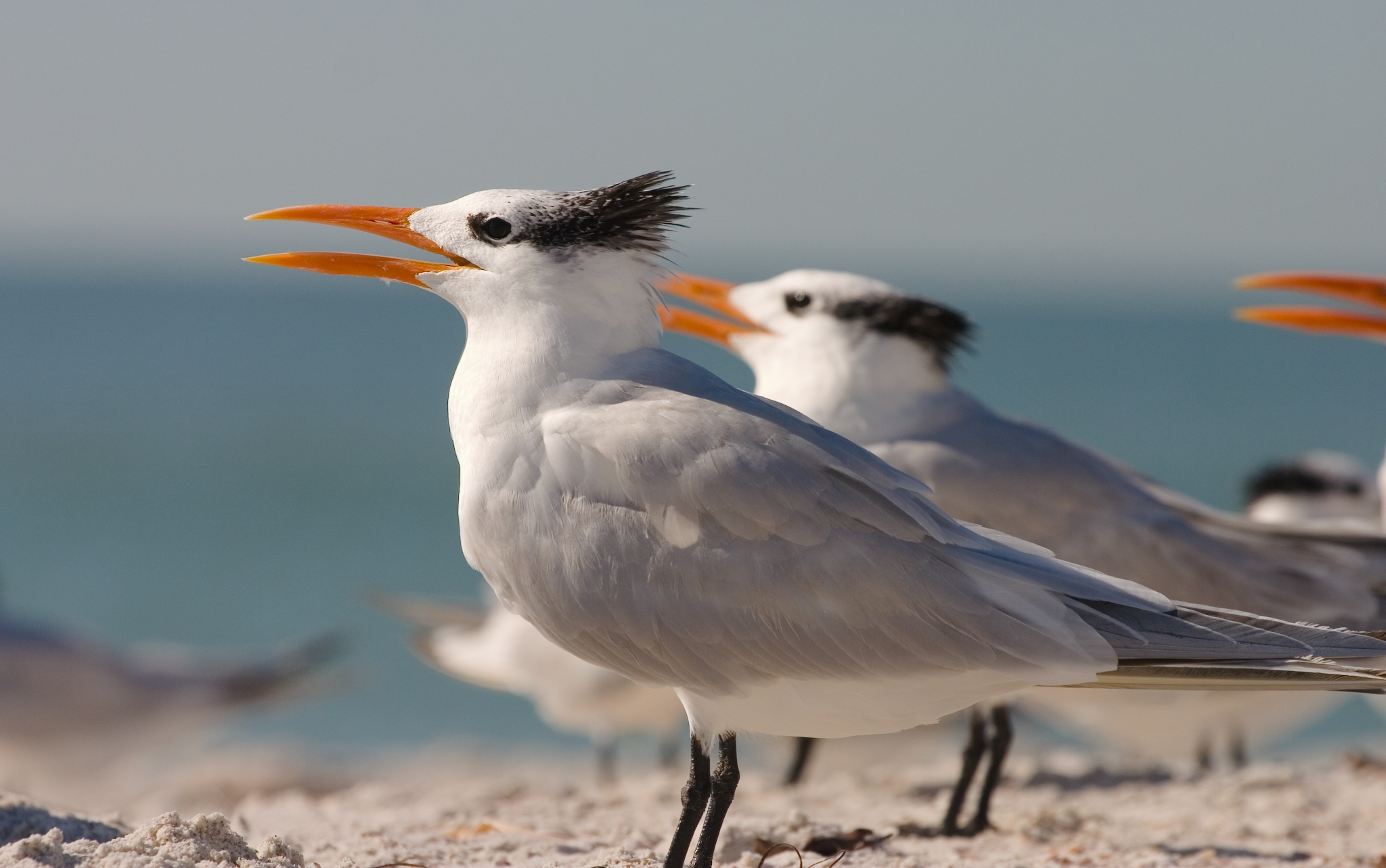
- Winter plumage, Florida
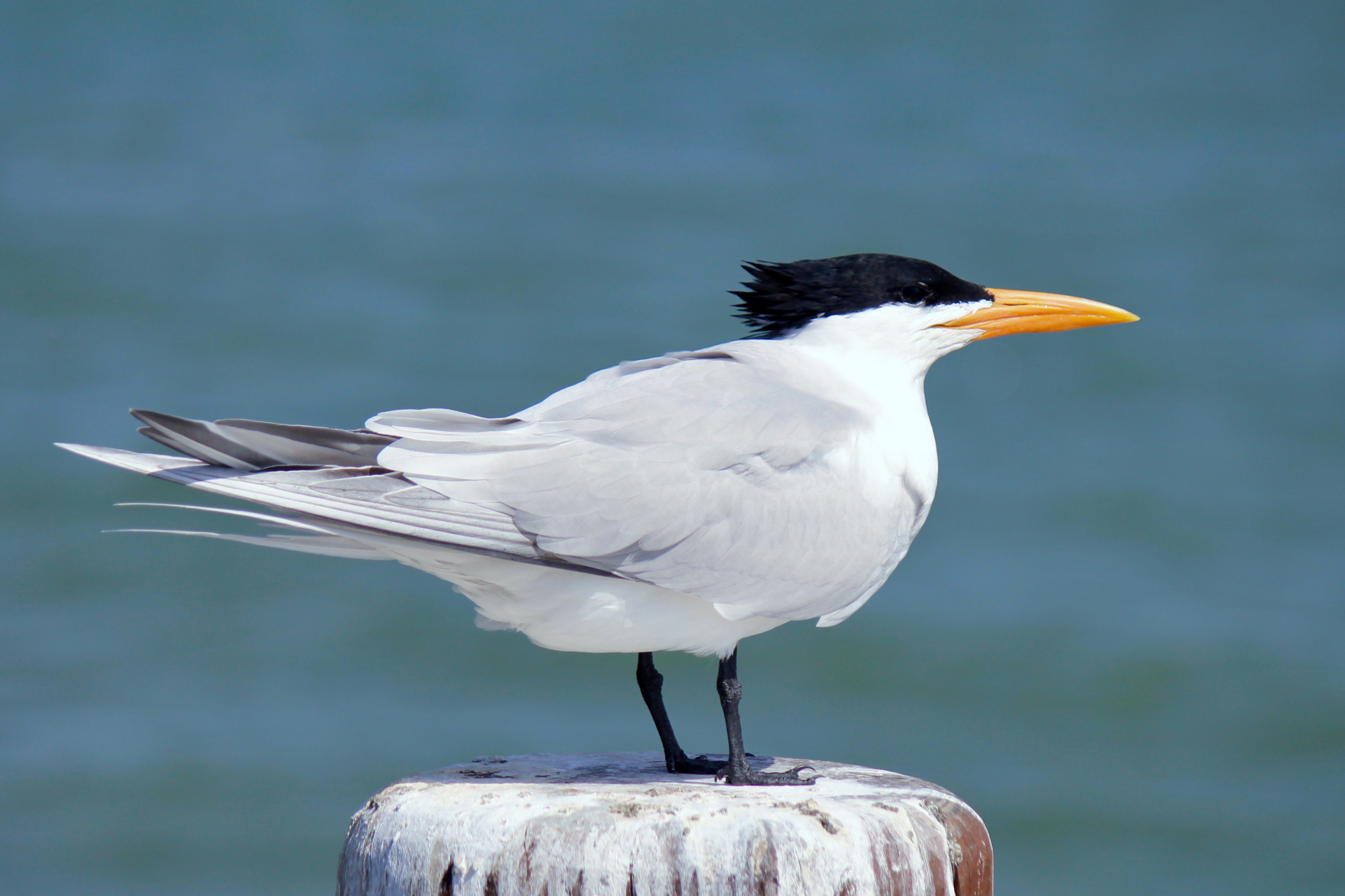
- Breeding plumage, Belize

Conservation status
- Least Concern (IUCN 3.1)

Scientific classification
- Kingdom: Animalia
- Phylum: Chordata
- Class: Aves
- Order: Charadriiformes
- Family: Laridae
- Genus: Thalasseus
- Species: T. maximus

Binomial name
- Thalasseus maximus (Boddaert, 1783)
- Orange: breeding summer visitor Purple: breeding resident Blue: non-breeding winter visitor

Synonyms
- Sterna maxima

= Royal tern =

Species of bird

The royal tern (Thalasseus maximus) is a tern in the family Laridae. The species is endemic to the Americas, though vagrants have been identified in Europe.

== Taxonomy ==
The royal tern was described by the French polymath Georges-Louis Leclerc, Comte de Buffon in 1781 in his Histoire Naturelle des Oiseaux from a specimen collected in Cayenne, French Guiana. The bird was also illustrated in a hand-colored plate engraved by François-Nicolas Martinet in the Planches Enluminées D'Histoire Naturelle which was produced under the supervision of Edme-Louis Daubenton to accompany Buffon's text. Neither the plate caption nor Buffon's description included a scientific name but in 1783 the Dutch naturalist Pieter Boddaert coined the binomial name Sterna maxima in his catalogue of the Planches Enluminées. The royal tern is now placed in the genus Thalasseus that was erected by the German zoologist Friedrich Boie in 1822.

The generic name is derived from the Ancient Greek θάλασσα (thálassa) meaning "sea". The specific epithet maximus is Latin for "greatest".

The royal tern belongs to the class Aves and the order Charadriiformes. Charadriiformes includes seabirds and shorebirds of small to medium-large size. Within Charadriiformes, it is placed in the family Laridae, subfamily Sterninae, because of its white plumage, a black cap on its head, long bill, webbed feet, and bodies that are more streamlined than those of gulls.

The taxonomy of the royal tern has been debated, whether the correct scientific name was Thalasseus maximus or Sterna maxima. It was originally placed in the genus Sterna; however, a 2005 study found that the genus Thalasseus is genetically distinct from Sterna; thus it is presently classified as Thalasseus maximus, which places it with seven other crested terns.

The West African crested tern (Thalasseus albididorsalis) was formerly considered to be a subspecies of royal tern. It was elevated to species status in January 2020, after genetic data showed that West African crested tern is more closely related to lesser crested tern than it is to royal tern.

== Description ==
This is a large tern, second only to the Caspian tern among terns in the Americas, but is unlikely to be confused with this "carrot-billed" giant, which has extensive dark underwing patches. Adults have an average wingspan of 130 cm (51 in) for both sexes, with a range from 125–135 cm (49–53 in). Its bill-to-tail length ranges from 45–50 cm (18–20 in) and the weight is anywhere from 350–500 g (12–18 oz). The Old World West African crested tern T. albididorsalis and greater crested tern T. bergii are the same size; vagrant royal terns in Europe need careful documentation to distinguish them from the West African crested tern, which has also been recorded in Europe. The royal tern can also be confused with the smaller elegant tern T. elegans; that has a longer but slenderer, slightly downcurved, bill, and a longer crest.

The royal tern has a stout orange-red bill, pale silvery-gray upperparts, and white underparts. Its legs are black. The entire crown is black with a shaggy, erectable crest on the nape in the spring during courtship and the start of the breeding season. From early summer into late winter, the black becomes first patchy and then fully white on the forehead and upper crown, retaining black only on the nape. Compared to elegant tern, its molt out of breeding plumage is about two months earlier (June, versus August, for northern populations), and more extensively white. Juvenile royal terns are similar to non-breeding adults, differing in the juveniles having darker gray to blackish marks on the wings, and a yellower bill.

The calls of the royal tern are usually short, clear shrills. Some of the shrills sound like kree or tsirr; it also has a more plover-like whistle that is longer, rolling, and more melodious.

== Distribution and habitat ==
The royal tern is found on both coasts of the Americas. In the northeast, during the breeding season (April to July) it is primarily found from Texas to Virginia, with scattered breeding records as far north as Long Island, New York, and south to French Guiana, and on several Caribbean islands. It also breeds in the southeast from southeastern Brazil south to Chubut Province in Argentina. The wintering range in the east is from North Carolina south to Panama and the Guianas and throughout the Caribbean. The western population nests from California to Mexico and winters from California south to Peru. Argentinian breeders are resident or disperse into Brazil.

== Behavior ==
=== Feeding ===
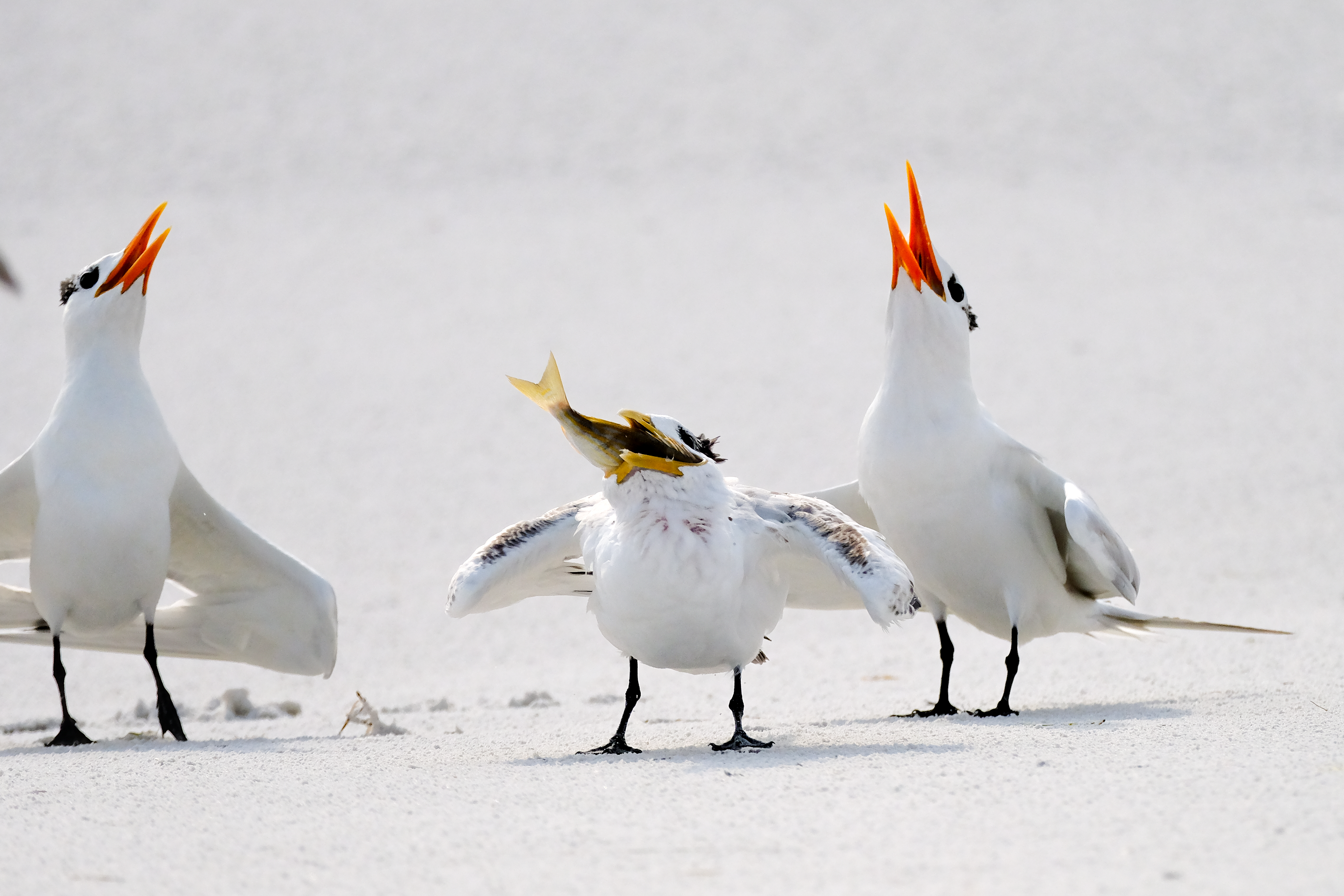
A Royal Tern chick being fed by its parents.

The royal tern typically feeds in small secluded bodies of water such as estuaries, mangroves, and lagoons. Also, but less frequently, the royal tern will hunt for fish in open water, typically within about 100 meters (110 yards) of the shore. The royal tern feeds in salt water and on very rare occasions in fresh water. When feeding they fly long distances from the colony to forage. The royal tern feeds by diving into the water from heights near 9 meters (30 feet). They usually feed alone or in groups of two or three but on occasion, they feed in large groups when hunting large schools of fish.

The royal tern usually feeds on small fish such as anchovies, weakfish, and croakers. Fish are their main source of food but they also eat insects, shrimp, crabs, and hatchling sea turtles. The royal tern feeds on small crabs, such as young blue crabs that swim near the surface of the water. When feeding on small crabs the royal tern does not use its normal plunge-dive technique, but instead uses short shallow dives so that they are concealed from their prey. The royal tern also uses this technique when hunting flying fish.

=== Breeding ===
The royal tern nests on island beaches or isolated beaches with limited predators. It lays one or two eggs, usually in a scrape, an area on the ground where a tern has made a small hole to lay its eggs. In some cases, tern eggs are laid directly on the ground, not in a scrape. The eggs incubate from 25 to 30 days; after the eggs hatch the chicks remain in the scrape for about a week. About two weeks after hatching the chicks gather into groups called a crèche. When the chicks are in the crèche, they are primarily fed by their parents who recognize their offspring by their voice and looks. While the chicks are in the crèche, they usually roam freely around the colony. In a large colony, there can be thousands of chicks in the crèche. When the chicks are a month old they fledge or start to fly; after fledging, the young remain dependent on their parents for food and protection until they are 5–8 months old. Royal terns mature around the age of 4 years, after which they build their own nests and reproduce.

== Threats ==
The royal tern has few predators when it is mature, but before the chicks hatch or while they are chicks the tern is threatened by humans, other animals, and the tides. Humans threaten terns by fishing and by disrupting the tern nesting sites. Fishing nets can catch a tern while it is diving, making it unable to feed or it may cause it to drown if it is caught underwater. Animals such as foxes, raccoons, and large gulls prey on tern chicks and tern eggs.

Tern nesting sites can also be affected by the tides; if a tern colony has nested too close to the high tide mark, a spring tide can flood the nesting site and kill the chicks and make unhatched eggs infertile.

== Conservation ==
The IUCN has rated the royal tern as of Least Concern.

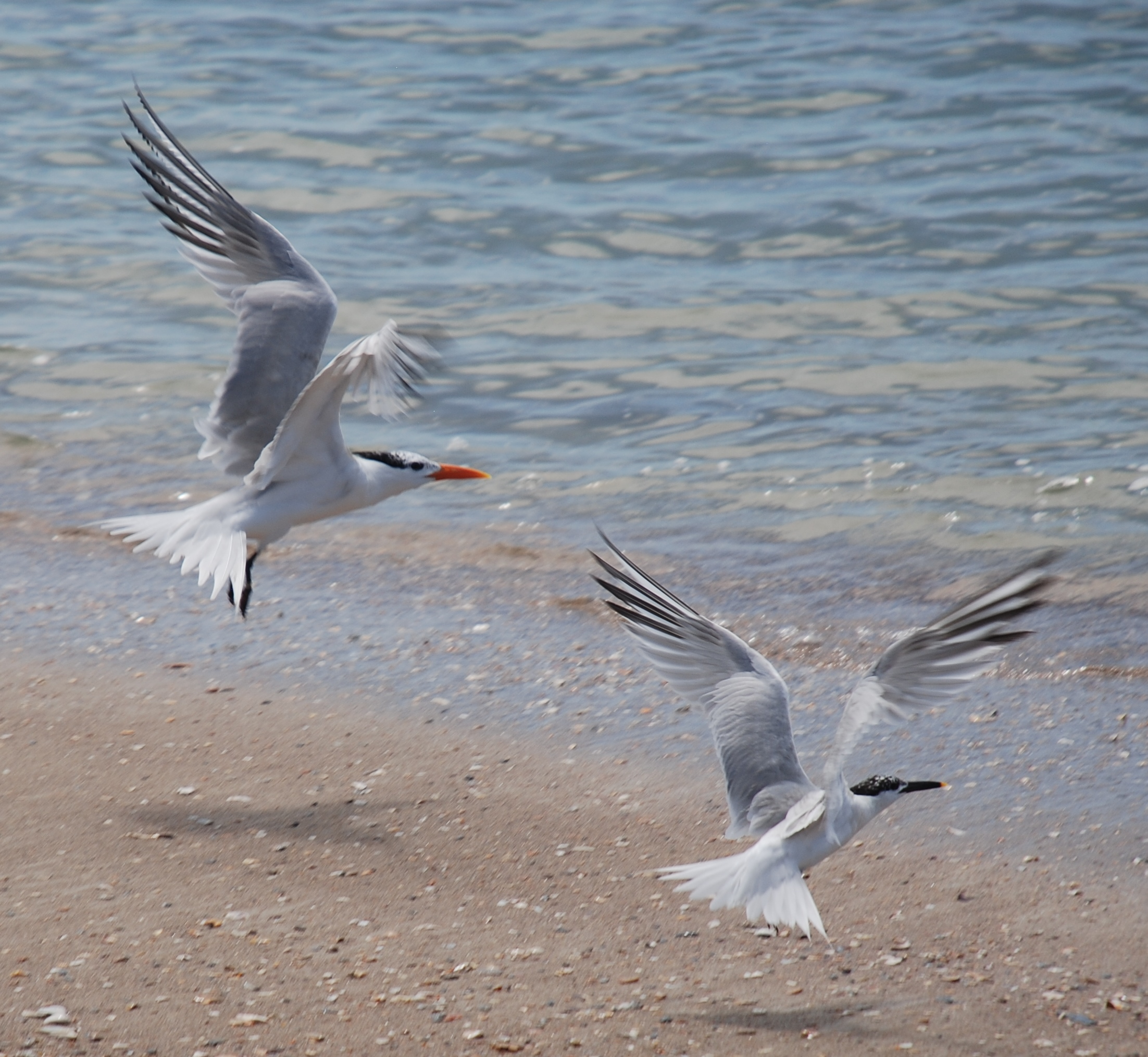
Adult royal tern and Cabot's tern (smaller bird, right) in flight at Core Banks, North Carolina.

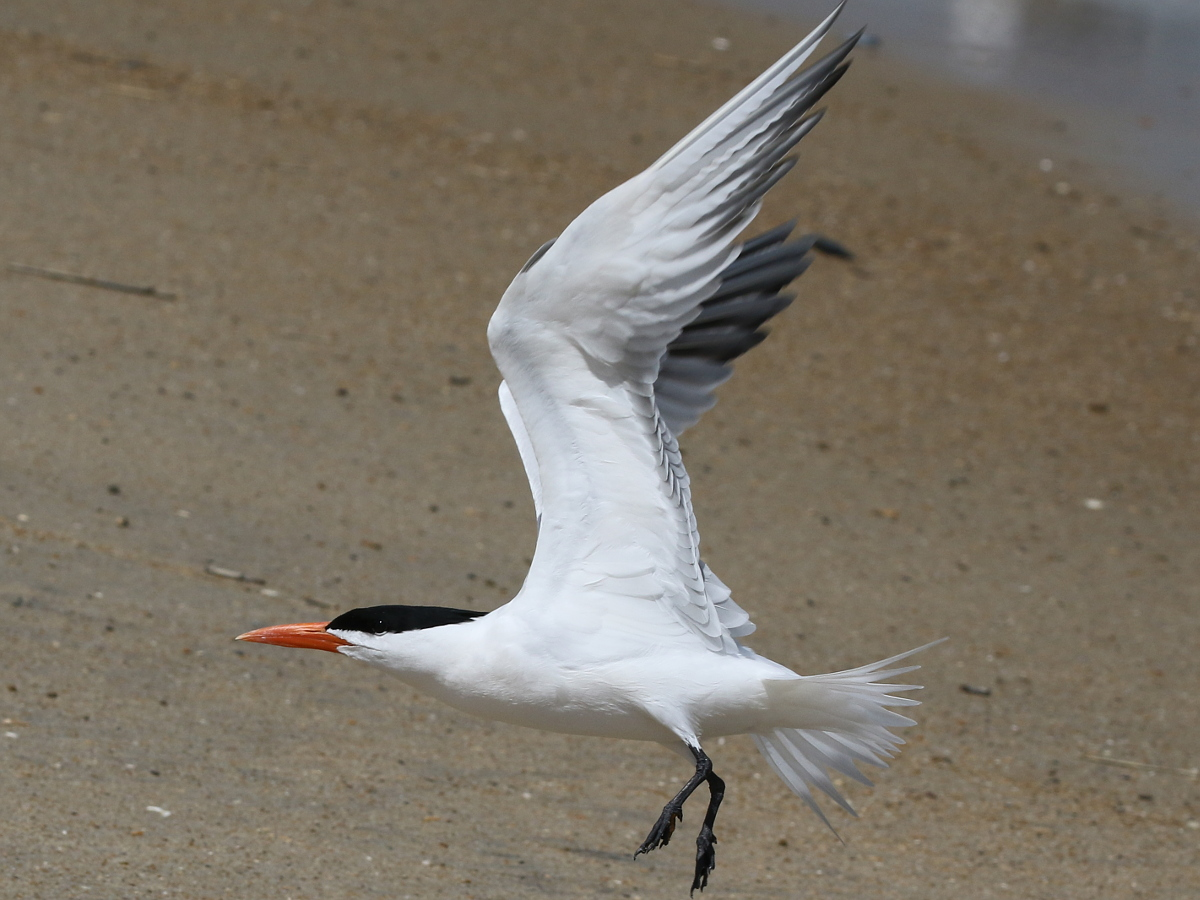
All white underparts Rodanthe, North Carolina

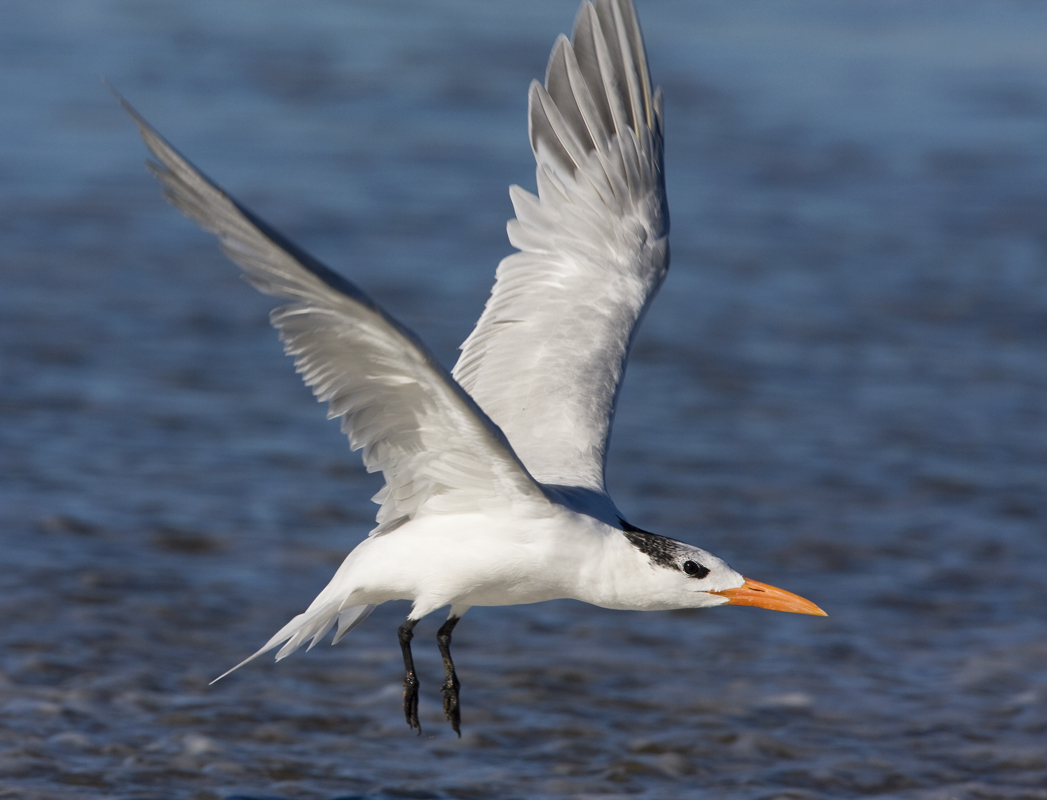
In flight at Morro Bay, California

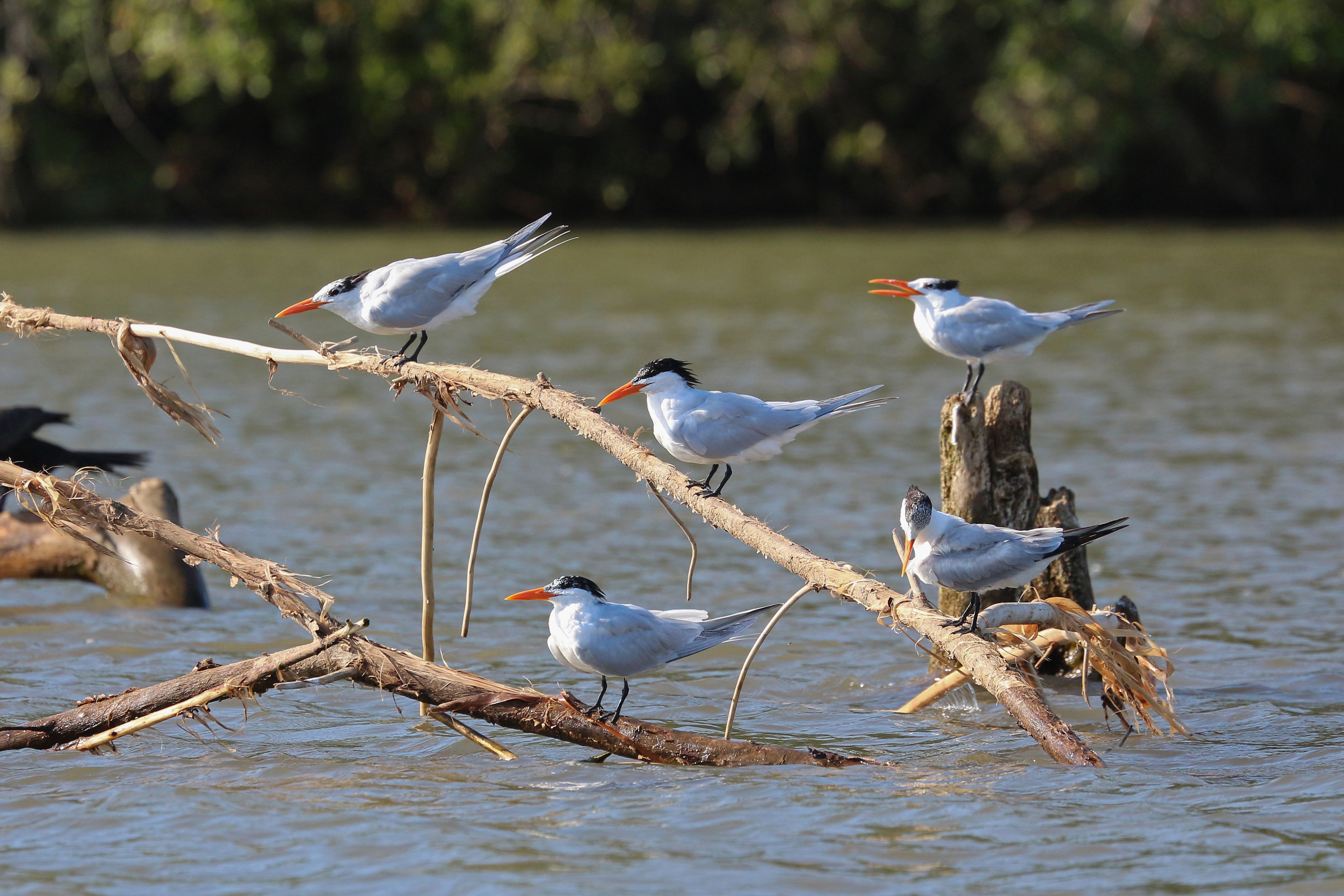
Group of royal terns in Tárcoles River, Costa Rica

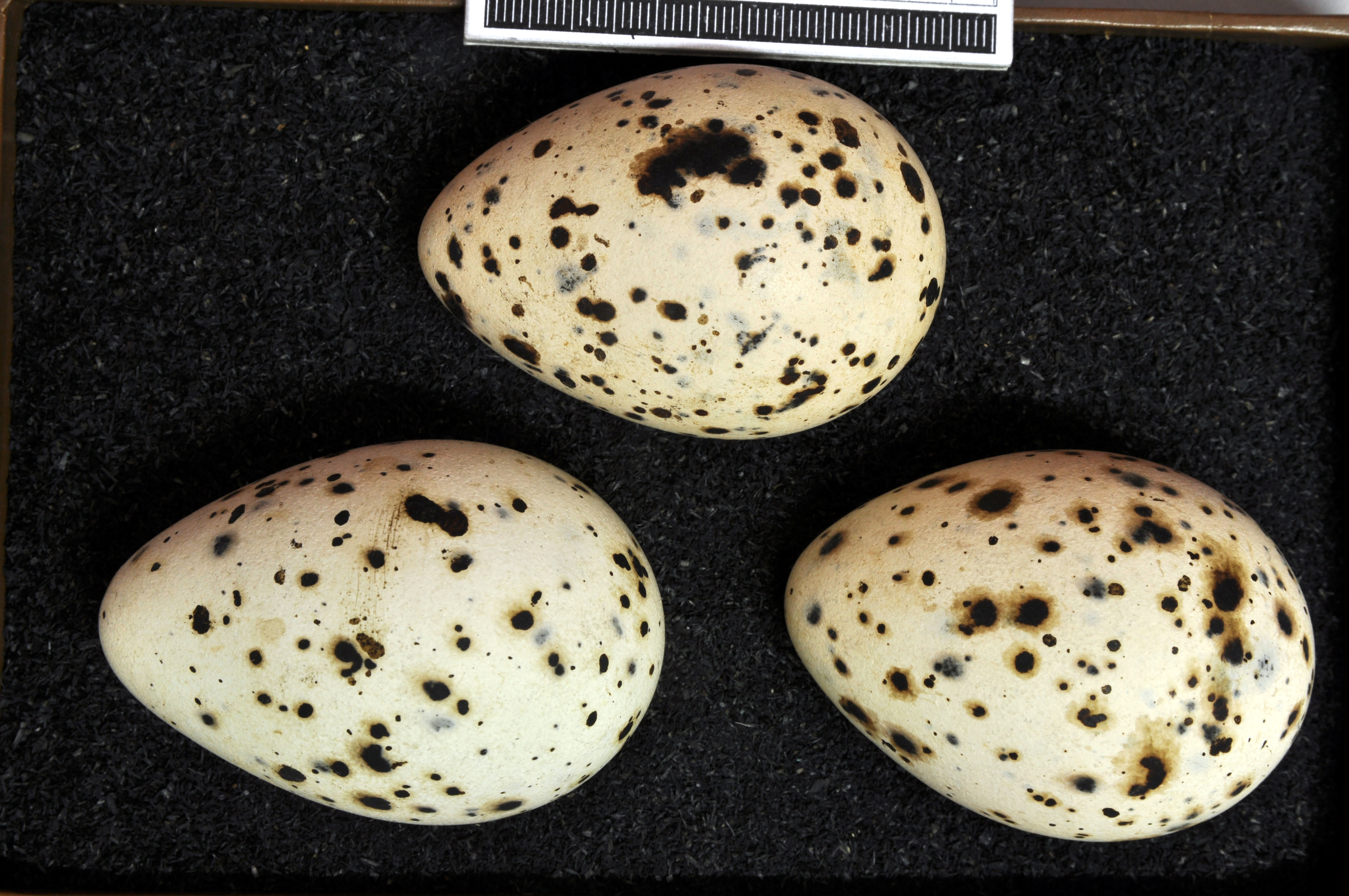
Eggs, collection Museum Wiesbaden
