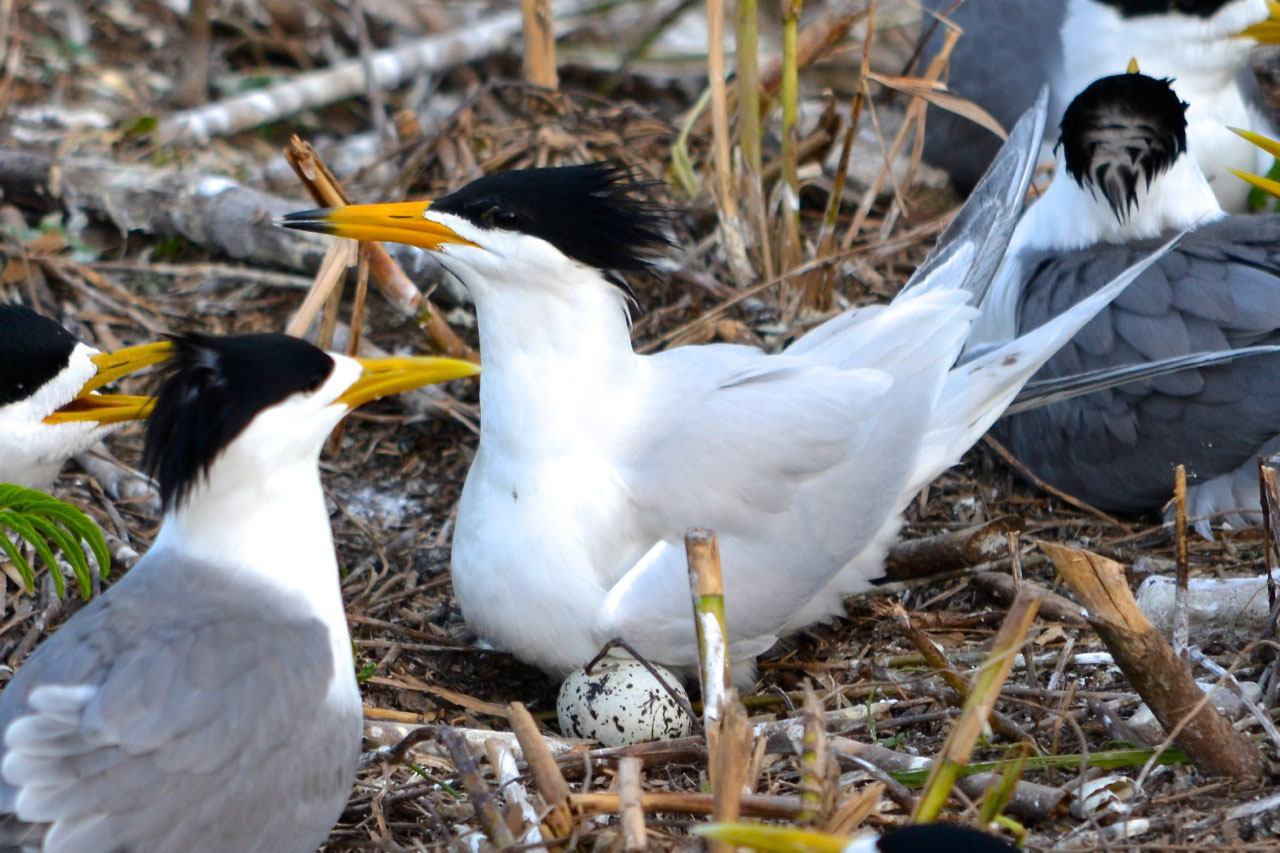
- A Chinese crested tern among greater crested terns

Conservation status
- Critically Endangered (IUCN 3.1)

Scientific classification
- Kingdom: Animalia
- Phylum: Chordata
- Class: Aves
- Order: Charadriiformes
- Family: Laridae
- Genus: Thalasseus
- Species: T. bernsteini

Binomial name
- Thalasseus bernsteini (Schlegel, 1864)

Synonyms
- Sterna bernsteini Sterna zimmermanni Reichenow, 1903; Thalasseus zimmermanni

= Chinese crested tern =

Species of bird

The Chinese crested tern (Thalasseus bernsteini) is a tern in the family Laridae. It is the county bird of Lienchiang County, Fuchien.

== Taxonomy ==
The Chinese crested tern was formally described in 1864 by the German naturalist Hermann Schlegel as Sterna bernsteini based on a specimen collected by the German naturalist Heinrich Agathon Bernstein at Kaou on the eastern coast of Halmahera, Indonesia. The specific epithet was chosen to honour the collector. The species in monotypic: no subspecies are recognised. The species was formerly known as Sterna zimmermanni (or Thalasseus zimmermanni), until the rediscovery of the previously lost type specimen of Hermann Schlegel's Sterna bernsteini in 1975 showed that his older name applied to this species, and not to T. bergii as had been thought before.

It is most closely related to greater crested tern T. bergii, and has hybridised with it.

== Description ==
It is a medium-large tern 38–43 cm long, closely similar in appearance to Sandwich tern T. sandvicensis, Cabot's tern T. acuflavidus, and lesser crested tern T. bengalensis. It is most similar to the former, differing in the bill pattern, which is the reverse of the Sandwich tern's, being yellow with a black tip; the bill is also stouter, like Cabot's. Like these, it has a full black crown in the breeding season, a pale, silvery-grey back and wings, and a white tail. From the lesser crested tern, which it overlaps in wintering distribution, it can be told by the white rump and paler grey mantle, as well as the black tip to the stouter bill, which seen from up close also has a white point. The larger greater crested tern, despite being its closest relative, differs more obviously in its all-yellow bill, white forehead in the breeding season, and much darker grey mantle and rump, as well as its larger size.

== Distribution and conservation ==
It is a critically endangered species, and previously thought extinct. Four pairs were rediscovered in 2000 nesting in a greater crested tern colony on an islet in the Matsu Islands (a territory governed by Taiwan), just off the coast of Fujian Province, China, and wintering south to the Philippines. In the past, it had a wider distribution of the Chinese east coast north to Shandong Province. The decline is thought to be due to past hunting and egg collection for food. This colony may have been protected due to the islands' disputed status (administered by the Taiwanese government but claimed by mainland China), and the military sensitivity of the area, which has restricted access. The islet has now been declared a wildlife sanctuary. It is possible that other small colonies may yet be found off the Chinese and Taiwanese coasts; migrant birds have been seen near the mouth of the Pachang River in southern Taiwan. The total population is speculated to be less than 50 birds.

In 2007, it was estimated that the Chinese crested tern would be extinct in five years if authorities would not protect it. BirdLife International stated that a survey of Chinese experts found that the number of crested terns fell to 50 birds, half the population of 2004. A Chinese survey team led by Chen Shuihua stated that the bird was "on the verge of extinction".

It is currently threatened by illegal egg collection, typhoons, and disturbance of nesting colonies by fishermen. There is also a threat from hybridisation with the greater crested tern.

In 2016, for the first time, Chinese crested terns were found breeding in an uninhabited island Yuksando, South Korea. Setting up a new colony in such a faraway area would prove a boon for the species.

=== Philippines ===
The first recorded sighting in the Philippines was in 1886 and then in 1905 in Manila Bay and in 1937. The next records were in March 2018, and along the coastal wetlands of Panabo, Davao del Norte, in November 2019. One was found along the shores of Lingayen Gulf in August 2021.

Three birds were seen at the mouth of the Davao River in 2022 during the Annual Asian Waterfowl Census for migratory birds.

The Department of Environment and Natural Resources (Philippines) said at least 3 birds were seen in Panabo City and Carmen, Davao del Norte and in Bucana, Talomo District, Davao City with other migratory birds in January 2023. One was at Bulacan in December 2023 along the sandbar that straddles the boundary between Santa Cruz, Paombong, and Pamarawan Island in Malolos northwest of New Manila International Airport.

=== Malaysia ===
In 2025, the Malaysian Nature Society Kuching Branch reported an individual among a small flock of greater crested terns during routine monitoring of migratory waders in Bako–Buntal Bay, Sarawak. This was the first confirmed sighting in Malaysia since 1913.
