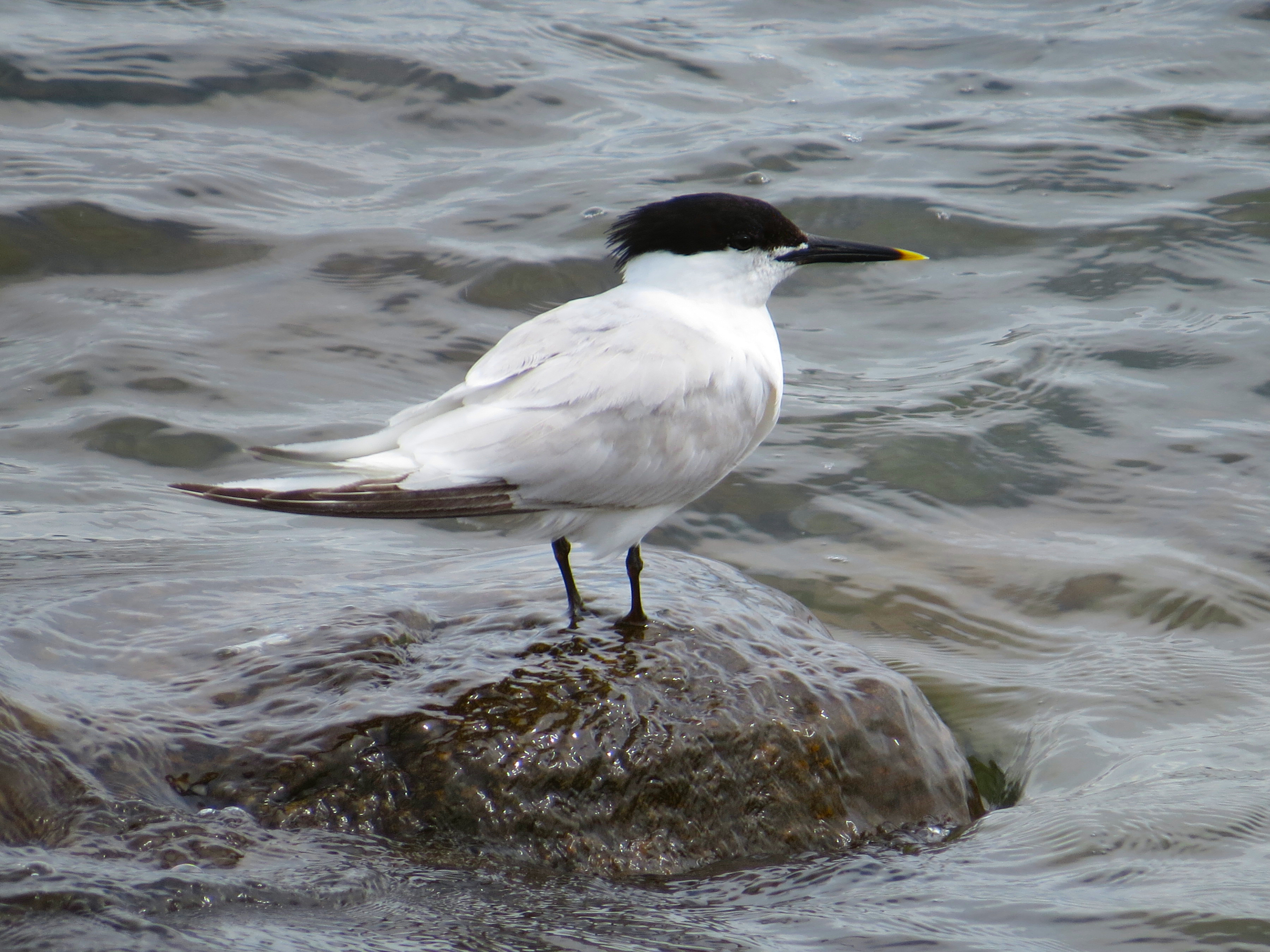
- Sandwich tern T. sandvicensis

Scientific classification
- Kingdom: Animalia
- Phylum: Chordata
- Class: Aves
- Order: Charadriiformes
- Family: Laridae
- Subfamily: Sterninae
- Genus: Thalasseus; F. Boie, 1822

Type species
- Sterna cantiaca Gmelin, 1788 = T. sandvicensis (Latham, 1787)

Species
- T. acuflavidus T. albididorsalis T. bengalensis T. bergii T. bernsteini T. elegans T. maximus T. sandvicensis

= Thalasseus =

Genus of birds

Thalasseus, the crested terns, is a genus of eight species of medium-large to large terns in the family Laridae.

The species have a worldwide distribution in temperate and tropical seas, mostly between about 43° N and S latitude, but to 60° N in the warm waters of the North Atlantic Current in the eastern North Atlantic Ocean. They do not occur in colder arctic or antarctic waters. Several of the species are abundant and well-known birds in their ranges; one is however extremely rare and critically endangered. This genus had originally been distinguished by Friedrich Boie in 1822, but had been little used (with one exception in 1978) until a 2005 study confirmed the need for a separate genus for the crested terns.

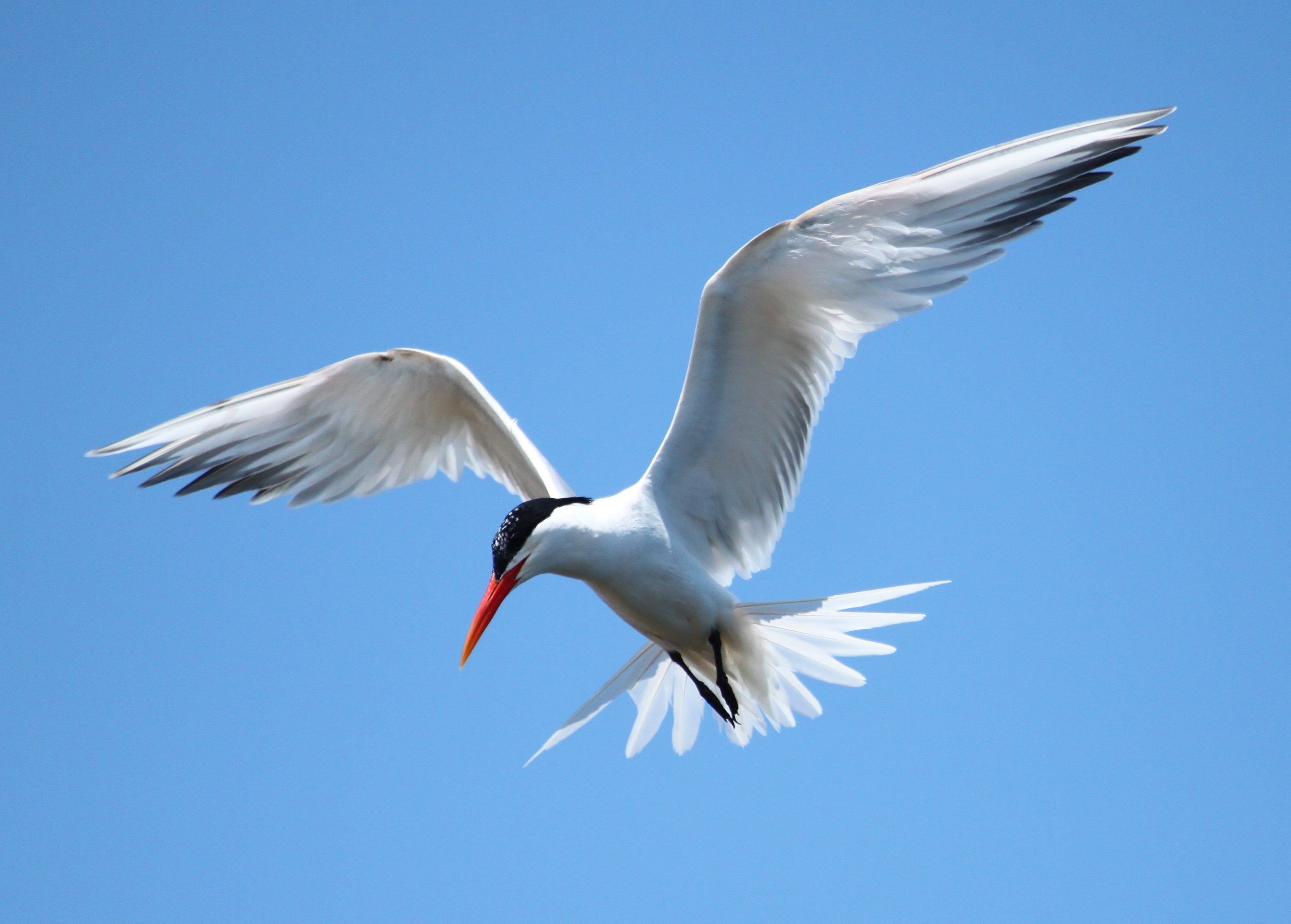
All Thalasseus terns (here, an elegant tern) have long, slender wings, and forked tails where the outer feathers are somewhat longer than the inner feathers, but not as markedly so as in terns in the genus Sterna

Thalasseus terns are large for terns, from 35–53 cm long, with lesser crested tern marginally the smallest, and greater crested tern marginally the largest. The underside plumage is white in all species, while the wings and back vary from pale silvery grey to dark grey. They have long thin sharp bills, a shade of yellow or orange except in the Sandwich tern and Cabot's tern where the bills are black with yellow tips (variably more extensively yellow in one subspecies of Cabot's tern); those with orange bills are sometimes colloquially referred to as a group as "orange-billed terns". All species have a shaggy black crest, which is erectile and used in the courtship display. In winter, the foreheads become white to a variable extent. They breed in very dense colonies on coasts and islands, and exceptionally inland on suitable large freshwater lakes close to the coast. They nest in a ground scrape. Thalasseus terns feed by plunge-diving for fish, almost invariably from the sea. They usually dive directly, and not from the "stepped-hover" favoured by, for example, the Arctic tern. The offering of fish by the male to the female is part of the courtship display.

== Taxonomy ==
The genus Thalasseus was described by the German zoologist Friedrich Boie in 1822. The type species was subsequently designated as the sandwich tern (Thalasseus sandvicensis). The generic name is derived from the Ancient Greek Thalassa meaning "sea".

=== List of species ===
The genus contains eight species:

Image	Name	Common name	Distribution
	Thalasseus sandvicensis	Sandwich tern	Northern Europe to Mediterranean, Black and Caspian Seas, wintering south to South Africa and Sri Lanka. Monotypic.
	Thalasseus acuflavidus	Cabot's tern	East coast of the Americas from New Jersey south to Chubut, Argentina, also wintering on the Pacific coast. Two subspecies, T. a. acuflavidus (North America) and T. a. eurygnathus (South America).
	Thalasseus elegans	Elegant tern	Southern California, USA and western Mexico and wintering south to Peru, Ecuador and Chile. Monotypic.
	Thalasseus bengalensis	Lesser crested tern	Southern Mediterranean and Red Seas across the Indian Ocean to the western Pacific, and Australia, also wintering on African west coast south to Senegal. Three subspecies, T. b. bengalensis (Indian Ocean), T. b. emigratus (Mediterranean) and T. b. torresii (seas around Australia).
	Thalasseus albididorsalis	West African crested tern	Coasts of Mauritania to Guinea, wintering north to Morocco and south to Angola. Monotypic.
	Thalasseus maximus	Royal tern	Coasts of the Americas, from Virginia, USA south to Chubut, Argentina in east, and California south to Peru in west. Monotypic.
	Thalasseus bergii	Greater crested tern	From South Africa around the Indian Ocean to the central Pacific and Australia. Four subspecies, T. b. bergii (southern Africa), T. b. thalassinus (eastern Africa), T. b. velox (northern Indian Ocean), and T. b. cristatus (western Pacific Ocean).
	Thalasseus bernsteini	Chinese crested tern	Fujian Province, China, and wintering south to the Philippines. Monotypic. Critically endangered.

== Identification ==
Identification of Thalasseus terns within their core ranges is usually straightforward. Greater crested and Cayenne terns (which do not overlap in range) can be identified by their yellow to greenish-yellow bill colour. Of the orange-billed species, the only core range geographical overlaps are between West African crested and lesser crested terns in western Africa, and between royal and elegant terns on the west coast of the Americas. In both cases the larger size and strong bill of royal and West African crested terns should prevent misidentifications; in addition, lesser crested tern has a grey, not white, rump.

Identification of vagrants of the species with orange bills has proved to be much more difficult however, with known hybridisation, and birds which do not match the classic character sets of individual species. The two largely black-billed species, Sandwich tern and Cabot's tern, do not usually occur together, but each has occurred as vagrants within the range of the other; the best features for identification are the slenderer bill of Sandwich compared to Cabot's, their moult timing (earlier loss of the black crown in Cabot's), and the slight but often surprisingly obvious structural differences in their primary feather tips.

== Ecology ==
Their habit of breeding in very dense colonies had made them highly vulnerable to the 2021–2023 highly pathogenic avian influenza (HPAI) outbreaks, with mass mortality in numerous colonies of Sandwich tern in particular, and also West African crested tern.

== Palaeontology ==
An early Pliocene fossil bone fragment from the northeastern United States closely resembles a modern royal tern. It may be an unexpectedly early (3.7–4.8 million years before present) specimen of that species, or an ancestral member of the crested tern group.
