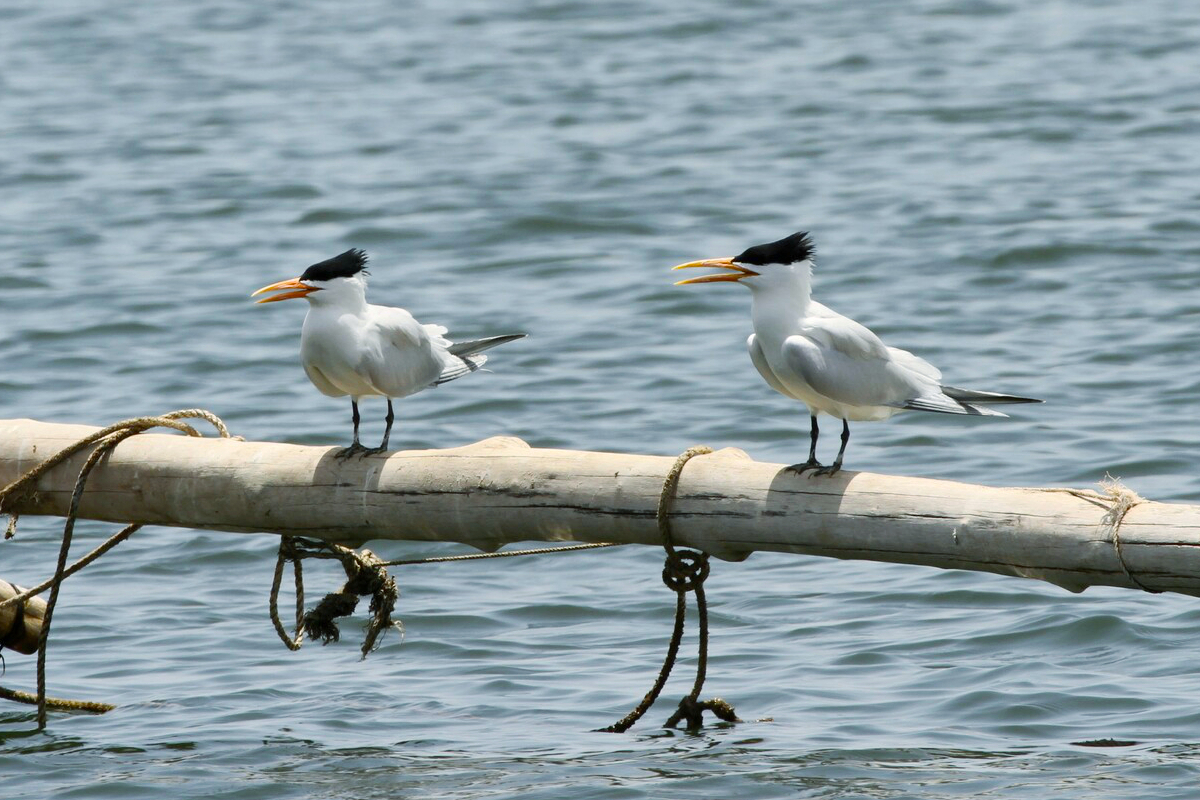
- Thalasseus albididorsalis pair in Senegal

Scientific classification
- Kingdom: Animalia
- Phylum: Chordata
- Class: Aves
- Order: Charadriiformes
- Family: Laridae
- Genus: Thalasseus
- Species: T. albididorsalis

Binomial name
- Thalasseus albididorsalis (Hartert, 1921)

= West African crested tern =

Species of bird

The West African crested tern (Thalasseus albididorsalis) is a bird species in the family Laridae. Until 2020 it was considered a subspecies of the New World royal tern, Thalasseus maximus.

== Taxonomy and systematics ==
The West African crested tern was long thought to be a subspecies of royal tern. A study published in 2005 showed that it is more closely related to the lesser crested tern (Thalasseus bengalensis), and a 2017 publication confirmed and expanded on those results. The International Ornithologists' Union accepted it as a full species on the publication of version 10.1 in January 2020, and the American Ornithological Society followed suit on 30 June 2020.

== Description ==
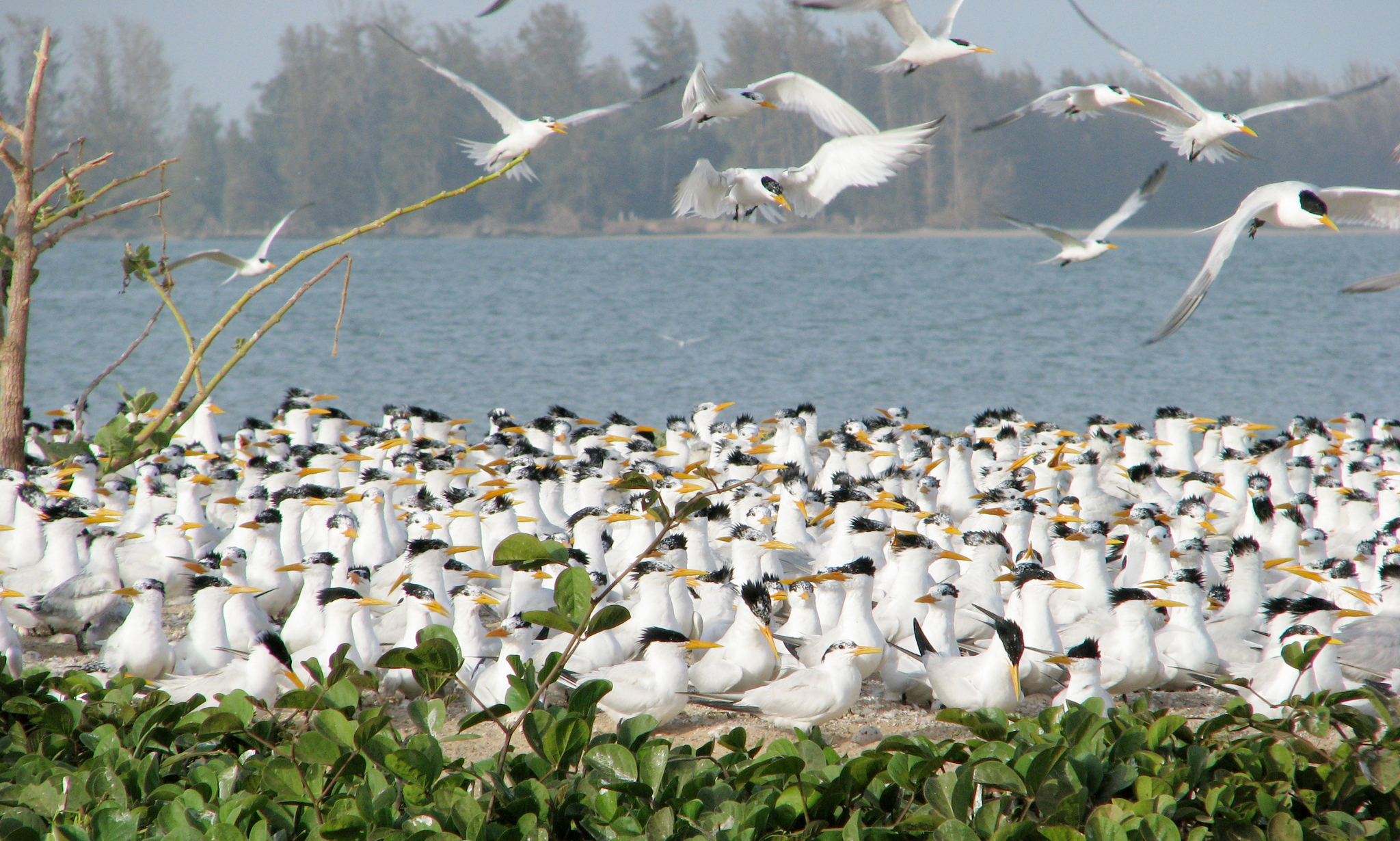
Breeding colony at Langue de Barbarie, Senegal

The West African crested tern is one of the three larger crested terns, along with royal tern and greater crested tern. Its tail is shallowly forked and the adult's bill is long and orange. It is about 50 cm (20 in) long, with a wingspan between 125–135 cm (49–53 in), and weighs 320–440 g (11–16 oz) with a mean weight of 367 g (12.9 oz). In breeding plumage its underside is white and upper parts silvery grey; the top of the head is black with a shaggy crest at the rear. As in all Thalasseus terns, the primary feathers are silvery when fresh, but soon become blackish with wear. The adult's legs are black. The non-breeding adult plumage is similar except that the black on the head is confined to the crest. Juveniles have variable plumage; the underside is white and the upper parts streaked and blotched, and the bill is smaller and paler yellow; the legs are seldom black but can be green, yellow, or pink.

== Distribution ==
The West African crested tern is known to breed only on a few islands off the coast of Africa between Mauritania, Senegal, and The Gambia, though it is suspected to also breed as far east as Nigeria. In the non-breeding season it can be found along the coast from Morocco to Namibia.

== Diet ==
Like all Thalasseus terns, the West African crested tern feeds by plunge-diving for fish and shrimp, usually in shallow coastal and tidal waters. It usually dives directly, and not from the "stepped-hover" used by Arctic terns. Its known foods include members of the herring family, mullet, grunts, jacks, and spadefish.

== Status ==
Its population in the early 1990s was about 25,000 pairs, with the largest colony 10,000 pairs. The IUCN has not yet evaluated its status. As with other Thalasseus terns, its habit of nesting in dense colonies renders it highly susceptible to highly pathogenic avian influenza (HPAI), with over 10,000 killed in an outbreak in Gambia and Senegal in spring 2023.
