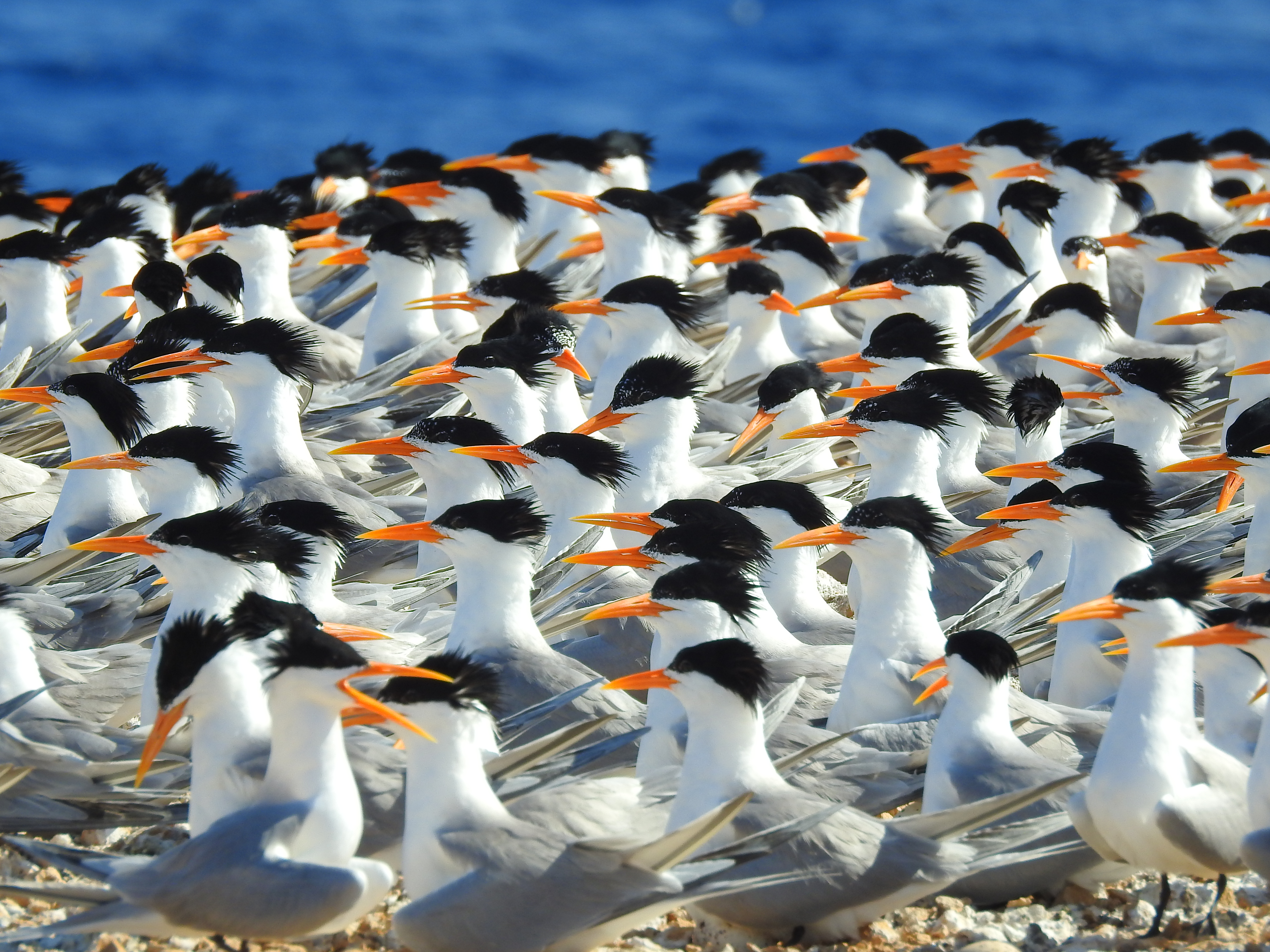
- Colony of T. b. bengalensis in the Red Sea off the Egyptian coast

Conservation status
- Least Concern (IUCN 3.1)

Scientific classification
- Kingdom: Animalia
- Phylum: Chordata
- Class: Aves
- Order: Charadriiformes
- Family: Laridae
- Genus: Thalasseus
- Species: T. bengalensis

Binomial name
- Thalasseus bengalensis (Lesson, 1831)

Synonyms
- Sterna bengalensis Lesson, 1831

= Lesser crested tern =

Species of bird

The lesser crested tern (Thalasseus bengalensis) is a tern in the family Laridae.

== Etymology ==
The genus name is from Ancient Greek Thalasseus, "fisherman" from thalassa, "sea". The specific bengalensis means "of Bengal", the type locality, historically referring to Bangladesh and part of Northeast India.

== Distribution ==
It breeds in subtropical coastal parts of the world mainly from the Red Sea across the Indian Ocean to the western Pacific, and Australia, with a significant population on the southern coast of the Mediterranean on two islands off the Libyan coast. It is an occasional vagrant to Europe, (Note: France, Italy, Spain and the United Kingdom) where it has been known to breed in pure and mixed (with Sandwich tern) pairs. The Australian birds are probably sedentary, but other populations are migratory, wintering south to South Africa.

== Subspecies ==
This bird has three geographical subspecies, differing mainly in size and minor plumage details:

- T. b. emigratus (Neumann, 1934): breeding in the Mediterranean on islands off the coast of Libya, wintering West Africa. Pale grey above (only marginally darker than Sandwich tern); slightly larger.
- T. b. bengalensis (Lesson, 1831): northern Indian Ocean including the Red Sea and the Persian Gulf, wintering to South Africa. Medium-dark grey above; slightly smaller.
- T. b. torresii (Gould, 1843): Indonesia south to Queensland, Australia, wintering in the same area (birds breeding in the Persian Gulf were formerly also sometimes cited as this subspecies). Dark grey above; slightly larger.
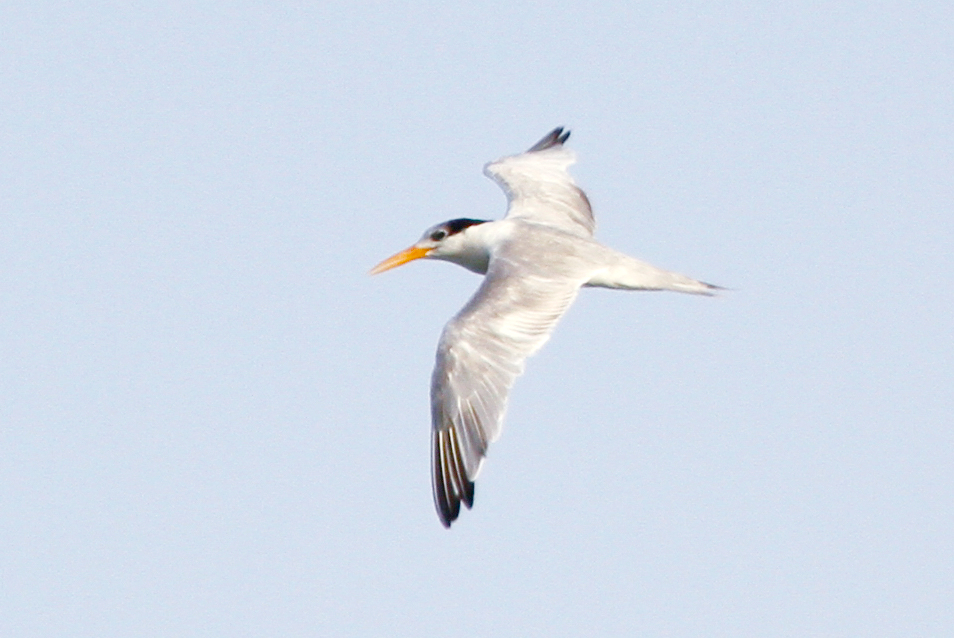
T. b. emigratus, Senegal

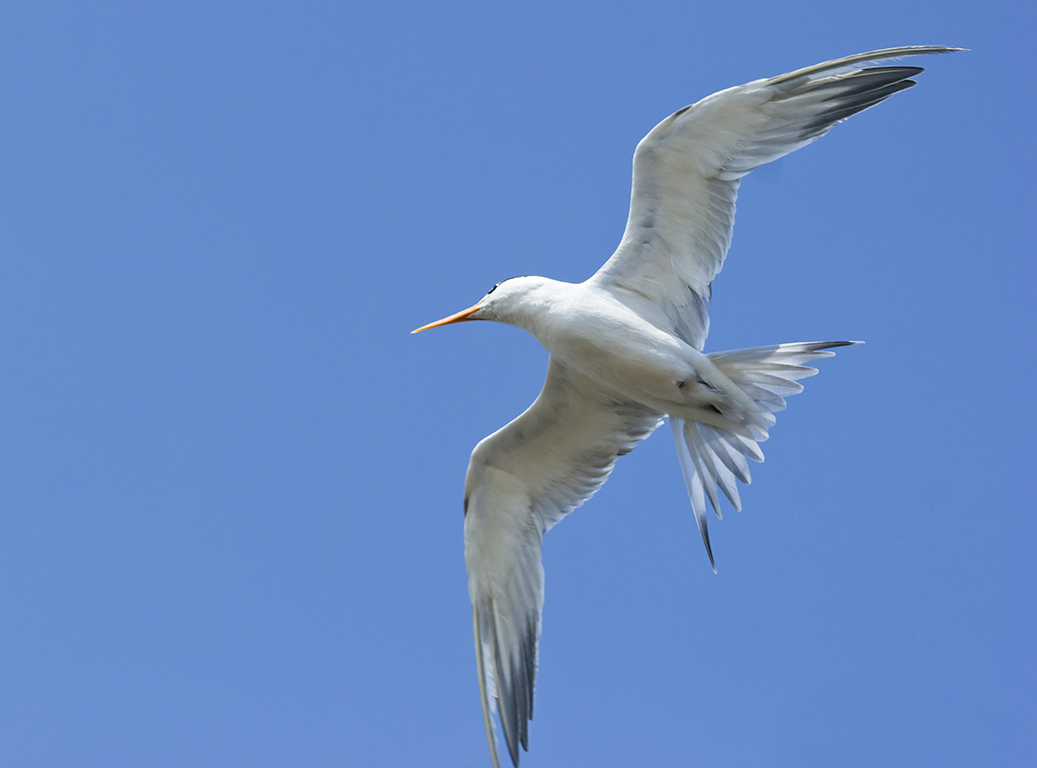
T. b. bengalensis, Kutch, India

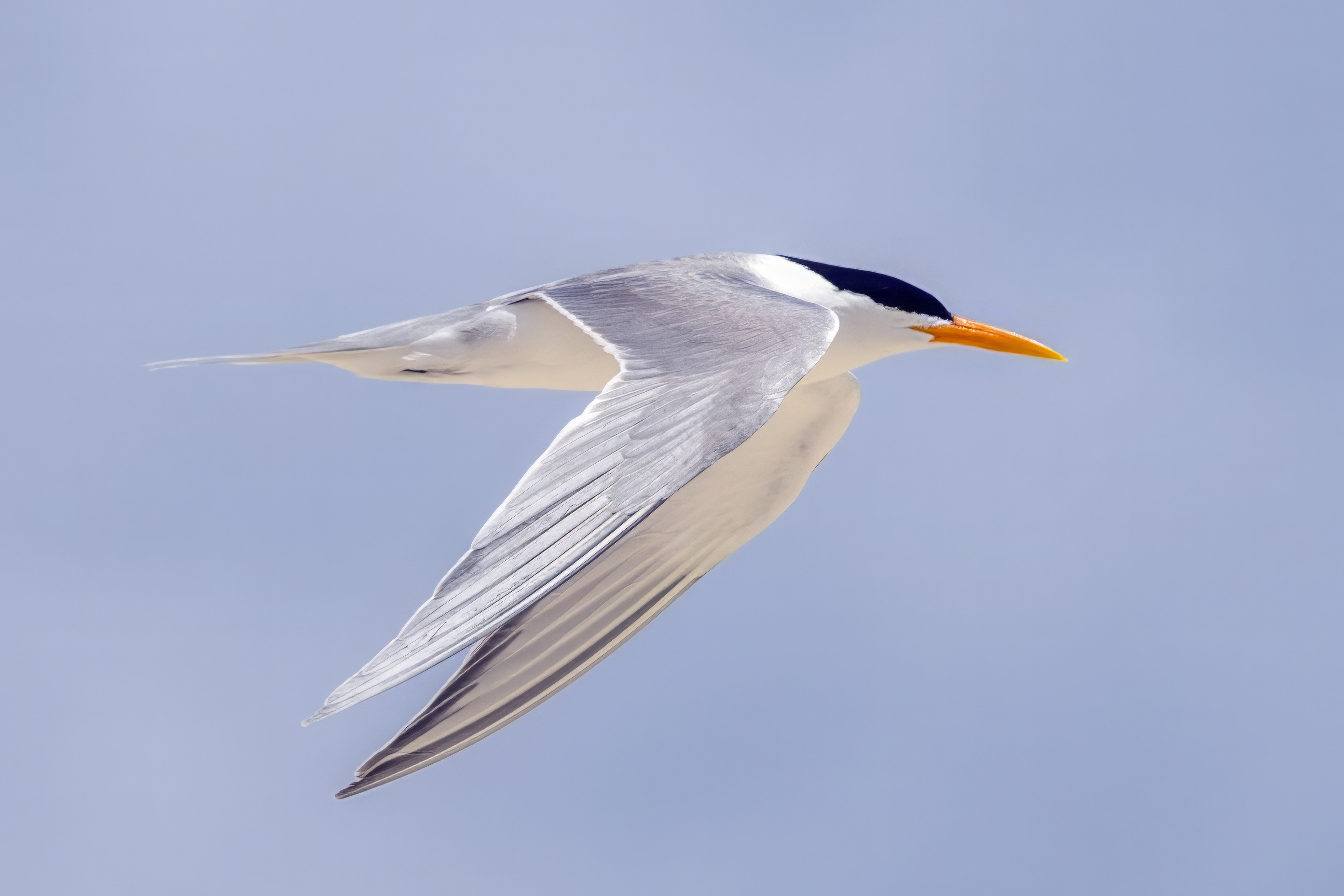
T. b. torresii, Michaelmas Cay, Queensland

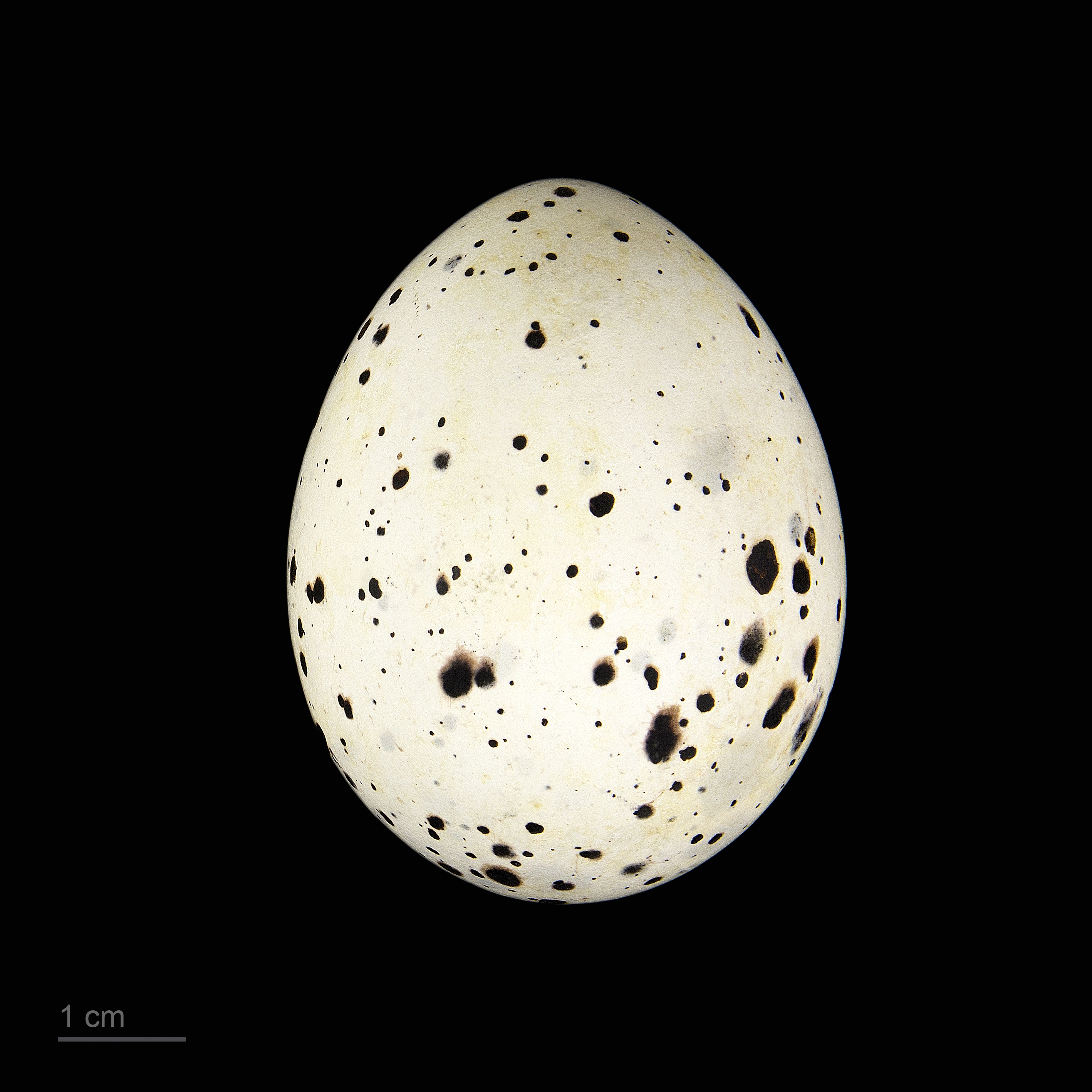
Thalasseus bengalensis egg, Muséum de Toulouse.

== Description ==
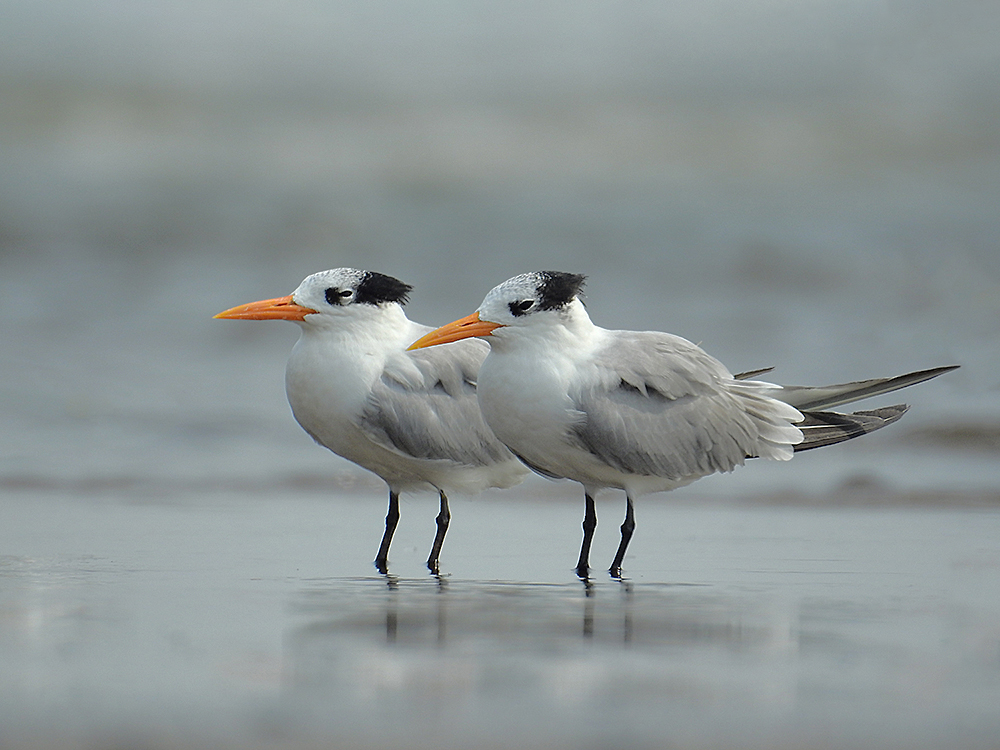
Lesser crested terns T. b. bengalensis in winter plumage, Akshi Beach, Maharashtra, India

This is a medium-large tern, 35–43 cm long and with a 88–105 cm wingspan; its weight ranges from 185–242 g. It is very similar in size and general appearance to its three very close relatives Sandwich tern, Elegant tern and Chinese crested tern. The summer adult has a black cap, black legs and a long sharp orange bill. The upperwings, rump and central tail feathers are grey and the underparts white. The primary flight feathers darken during the summer. In winter, the forehead becomes white. The call is a loud grating noise like Sandwich tern.

The grey rump is a useful flight identification feature distinguishing it from the related species. The Elegant tern also differs in a slightly longer, slenderer bill, while Chinese crested tern differs in a black tip to the bill and Sandwich tern a black bill with a yellow tip.

Juvenile lesser crested terns resemble same-age Sandwich terns, but with a yellow-orange bill, and paler overall, with only faint dark crescents on the mantle feathers.

There are two other orange-billed terns within the range of this species, West African crested tern, and Greater crested tern. Both are larger and stouter-billed; West African crested tern also has a white rump and tail, while crested tern (which shares the grey rump) is darker overall above and has a yellower to greenish-yellow bill.

Like all Thalasseus terns, lesser crested tern feeds by plunge-diving for fish, usually from saline environments. It usually dives directly, and not from the "stepped-hover" favoured by Arctic tern. The offering of fish by the male to the female is part of the courtship display.

This species breeds in dense colonies on coasts and islands. It nests in a ground scrape and lays one to two (rarely three) eggs. Nesting behaviour is very similar to that of Sandwich terns, with predator avoidance by nesting in very dense colonies, and also (in T. b. emigratus at least) by nesting in the late summer when predatory yellow-legged gulls have finished breeding and departed from the nesting area.

== Conservation ==
T. bengalensis is one of the species to which the Agreement on the Conservation of African-Eurasian Migratory Waterbirds (AEWA) applies, and one of 10 marine bird species listed in Mediterranean marine birds Action Plan.

In India the Lesser crested tern is protected in the PM Sayeed Marine Birds Conservation Reserve.

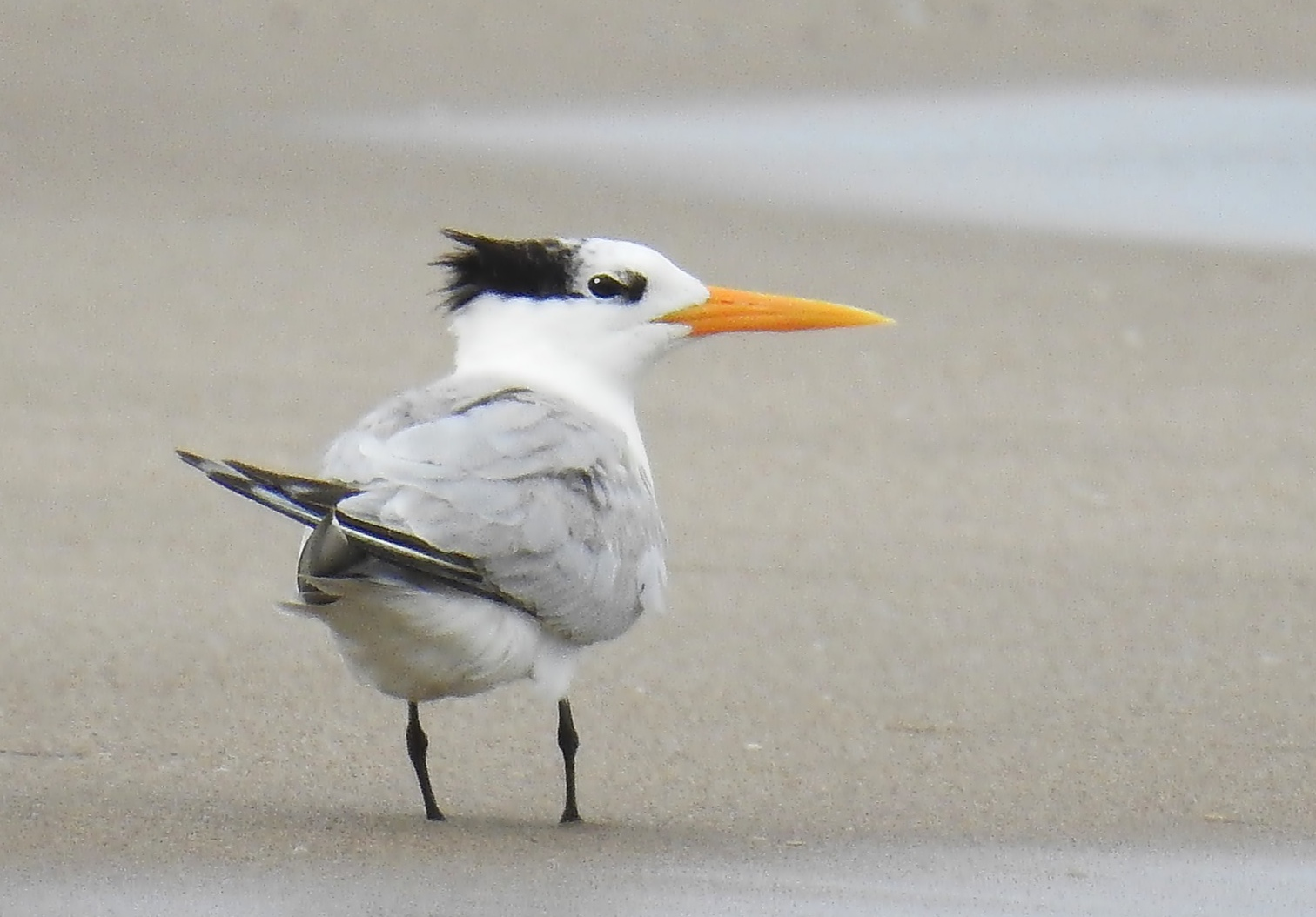
T. b. emigratus, Algeria

T. b. torresii at Manly Marina, SE Queensland, with crested and Caspian terns, silver gulls and pied oystercatcher

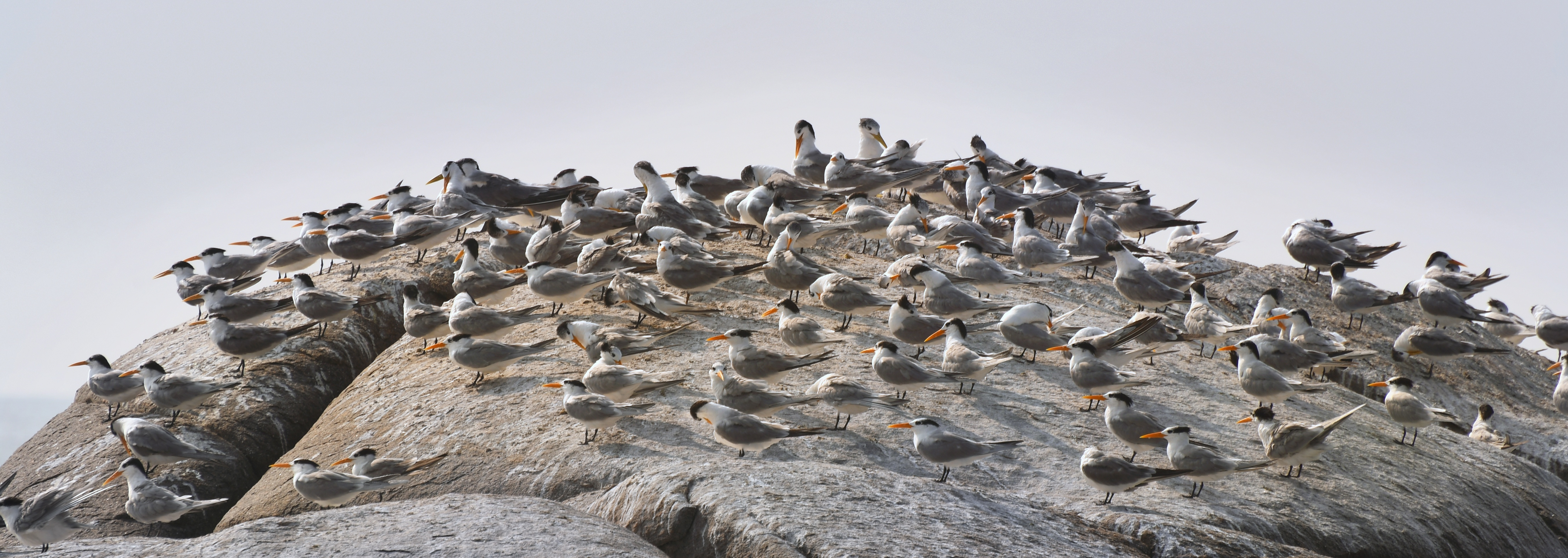
Lesser crested terns at Muzhappilangad beach
