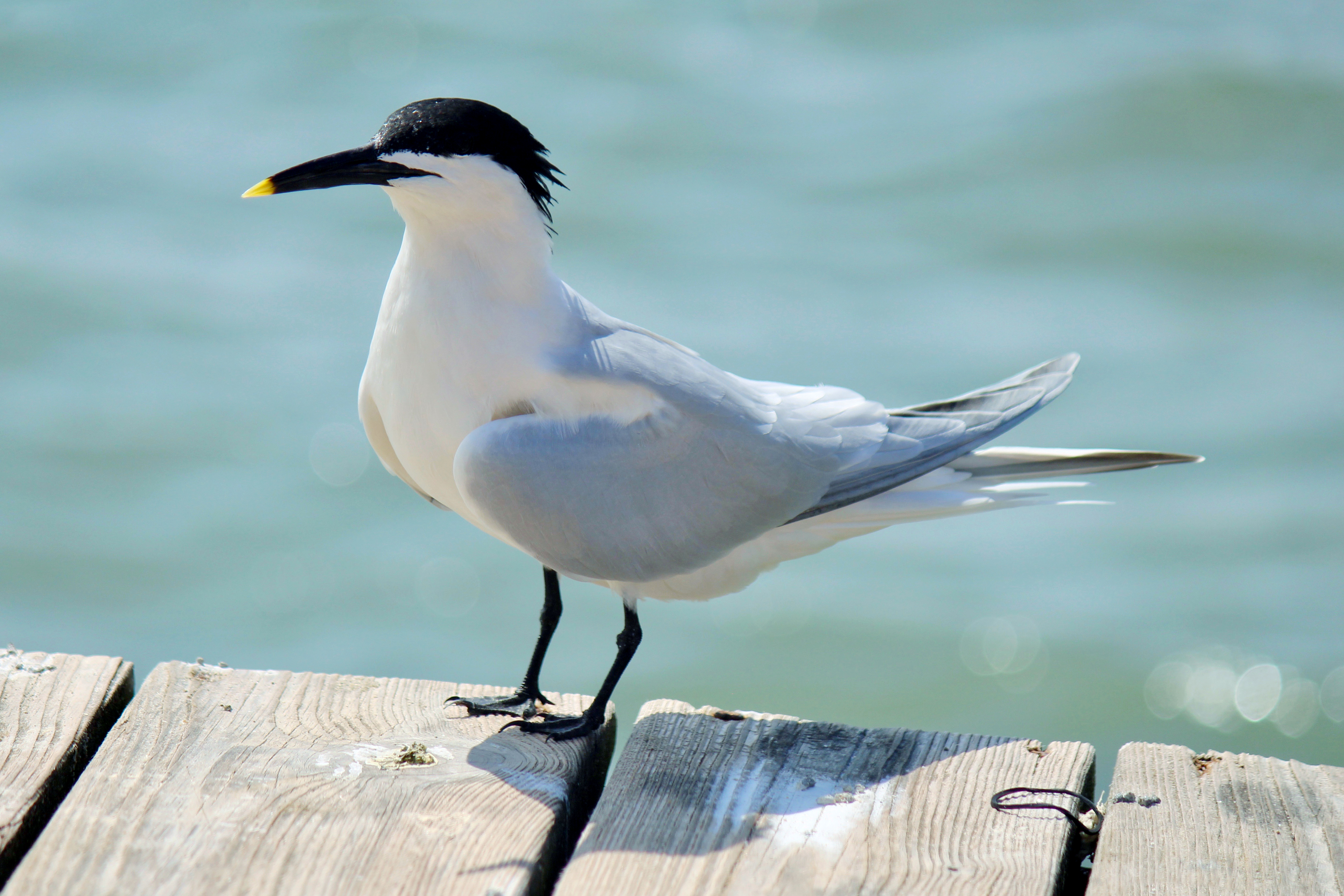
- T. a. acuflavidus in breeding plumage, Belize

Scientific classification
- Kingdom: Animalia
- Phylum: Chordata
- Class: Aves
- Order: Charadriiformes
- Family: Laridae
- Genus: Thalasseus
- Species: T. acuflavidus

Binomial name
- Thalasseus acuflavidus (Cabot, S, 1847)

Synonyms
- Thalasseus sandvicensis acuflavidus; Thalasseus acuflavidus; Thalasseus sandvicensis eurygnatha

= Cabot's tern =

Species of bird

Cabot's tern (Thalasseus acuflavidus) is a species of bird in subfamily Sterninae of the family Laridae, the gulls, terns, and skimmers. It is found on the coasts of the eastern United States and Middle America, the Caribbean, Trinidad and Tobago, and in every mainland South American country except landlocked Bolivia and Paraguay, though rare in Chile. It is also a vagrant in eastern Canada and western Europe.

== Taxonomy and systematics ==
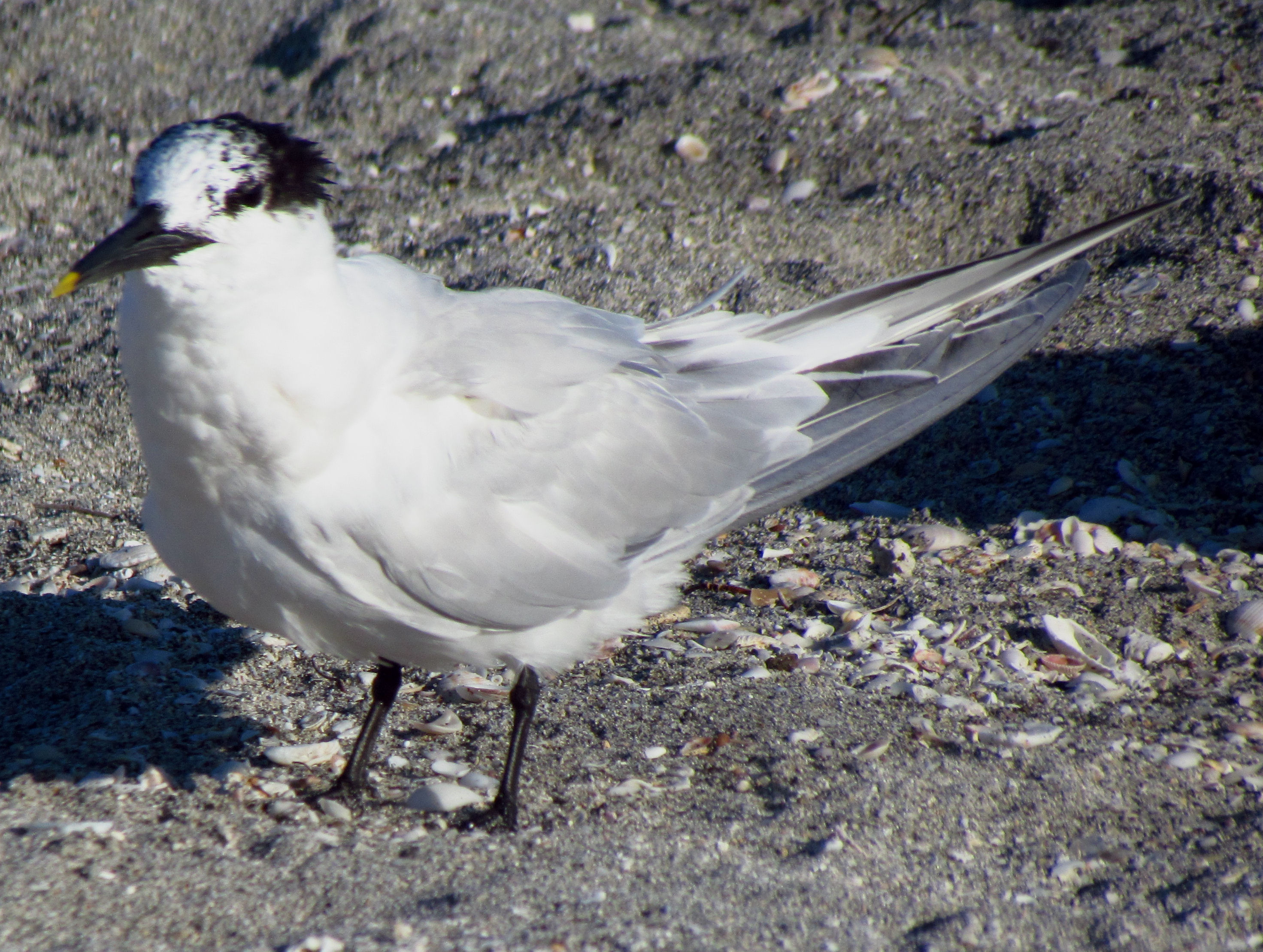
T. a. acuflavidus in non-breeding plumage, Venice Beach, Florida.

Cabot's tern was long placed in genus Sterna but since the early 2000s has been in its present genus Thalasseus. Its further taxonomy is not settled. The International Ornithological Committee (IOC) follows Efe et al. in part and treats it as a species with two subspecies, the nominate T. a. acuflavidus (Cabot, S, 1847) and T. a. eurygnathus (Saunders, 1876). The American Ornithological Society and the Clements taxonomy have not yet accepted Efe et al. and treat those two taxa as subspecies of the Sandwich tern (T. sandvicensis). BirdLife International's Handbook of the Birds of the World (HBW) follows a different conclusion to Efe et al. than the IOC by merging eurygnathus into acuflavidus but treats the merged taxon as one of two subspecies of the Sandwich tern. However, another study in 2017 confirmed Efe et al's results (as well as additionally proposing the splitting of West African crested tern from royal tern), as did a further 2022 study which confirmed both the above Thalasseus splits.

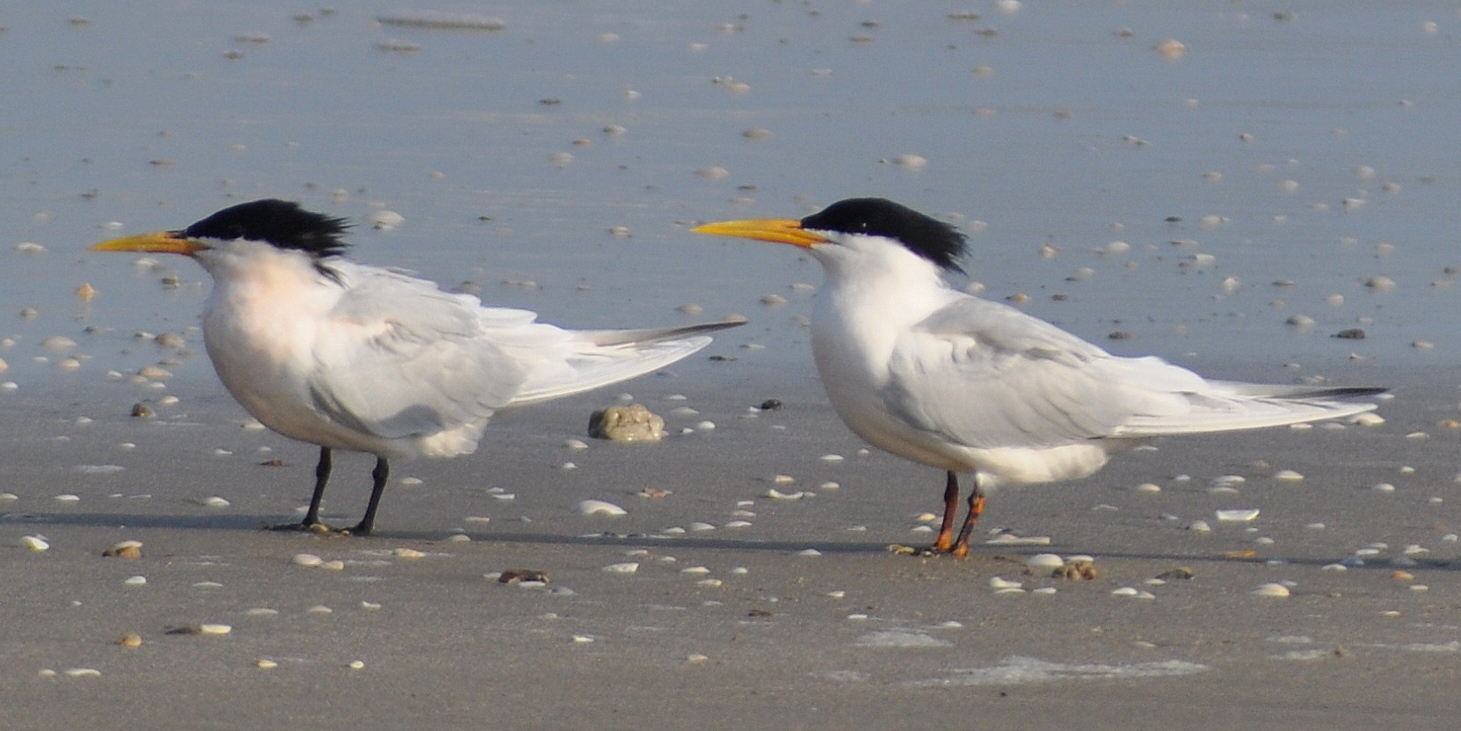
T. a. eurygnathus at Cassino, Rio Grande do Sul, Brazil. Note the largely yellow bill.

Some authors treat subspecies T. a. eurygnathus as a separate species, the "Cayenne tern" but this has not been widely accepted.

The genus Thalasseus is Ancient Greek for "fisherman", derived from thalassa, "sea". The specific epithet acuflavidus is from Latin acus, "needle", and flavidus, "yellowish".

== Description ==
Cabot's tern is a member of the "crested tern" group. It is 34 to 45 cm (13 to 18 in) long with a wingspan of about 1.0 m (3 ft). The nominate subspecies T. a. acuflavidus weighs 175 to 202 g (6.2 to 7.1 oz). The Caribbean population of T. a. eurygnathus weighs 170 to 210 g (6.0 to 7.4 oz) and the far southern population 250 to 300 g (8.8 to 11 oz). The sexes have the same plumage and there is little difference in plumage between the subspecies. Adults in breeding plumage have a black cap and a mostly white body with a pale gray back and sometimes a rosy flush on the underparts. Their tail is forked and white. The upper side of their wing is mostly pale gray with darker primaries. Their legs and feet are all black or black with yellow soles and their iris is dark brown to black. Non-breeding adults have a white forehead and mid-crown; their crest is black. The subspecies differ mainly in bill color: The nominate's is black with a yellow tip of somewhat variable extent; that of T. a. eurygnathus is mostly to completely yellow.

Cabot's tern is very similar to Sandwich tern, sharing the black bill with a yellow tip, but differs in the bill being obviously stouter, and also differs in molt timing, losing its black forehead earlier in the summer. Its juveniles also lack the scaly pattern of juvenile Sandwich terns, being a plainer gray (though they can be confused with first-winter plumage of Sandwich tern).

== Distribution and habitat ==
The nominate subspecies of Cabot's tern breeds on the U.S. coast from Chesapeake Bay south and around the Gulf of Mexico to Belize, and on the Bahamas, the Greater Antilles, and other Caribbean islands. It winters in southern Florida and the entire Gulf and Caribbean coasts, the Antilles, and in South America commonly in Colombia, Ecuador, and Peru though a few go as far south as Chile or east in northern Brazil. Subspecies T. a. eurygnathus is mostly a year-round resident from the north and east coasts of South America and the islands near it, south along the coast of Brazil to southern Argentina; a few breed as far north as Puerto Rico.

Cabot's tern is wholly a coastal species, and favors warm water. During the breeding season it inhabits barrier islands, dredge spoil islands, and in the Caribbean low-lying sand or coral cays. It generally uses bare ground but will nest on prostrate vegetation or mats of purslane (Sporobolus virginianus). It overwinters on sand beaches and sandbars, barrier islands, and reefs along coasts and also along the Panama Canal and short distances up rivers that empty into salt water.

== Behavior ==
=== Migration ===
Cabot's tern is partially migratory, withdrawing from the northernmost part of its breeding range for winter. Its migratory routes are not known in detail but are believed to follow coasts. Fall migration is protracted and spring's is more rapid. Birds that overwinter on the Pacific coast of South America apparently cross from the Caribbean at the Isthmus of Panama. Banded individuals of subspecies T. a. acuflavidus have wandered to the Netherlands and the United Kingdom.

=== Feeding ===
Cabot's tern is a powerful flyer, and feeds almost exclusively by plunge-diving from up to 7 m (25 ft) high. It sometimes goes completely under water in its dive. It often forages in small flocks and usually within 2 km (1 mi) of shore, though it apparently goes further out from the Texas shore. Its diet is mostly fish, with members of families Ammodytidae, Atherinopsidae, Clupeidae, Engraulidae, and Sciaenidae identified as prey. It eats smaller amounts of squid, shrimp, and insects.

=== Breeding ===
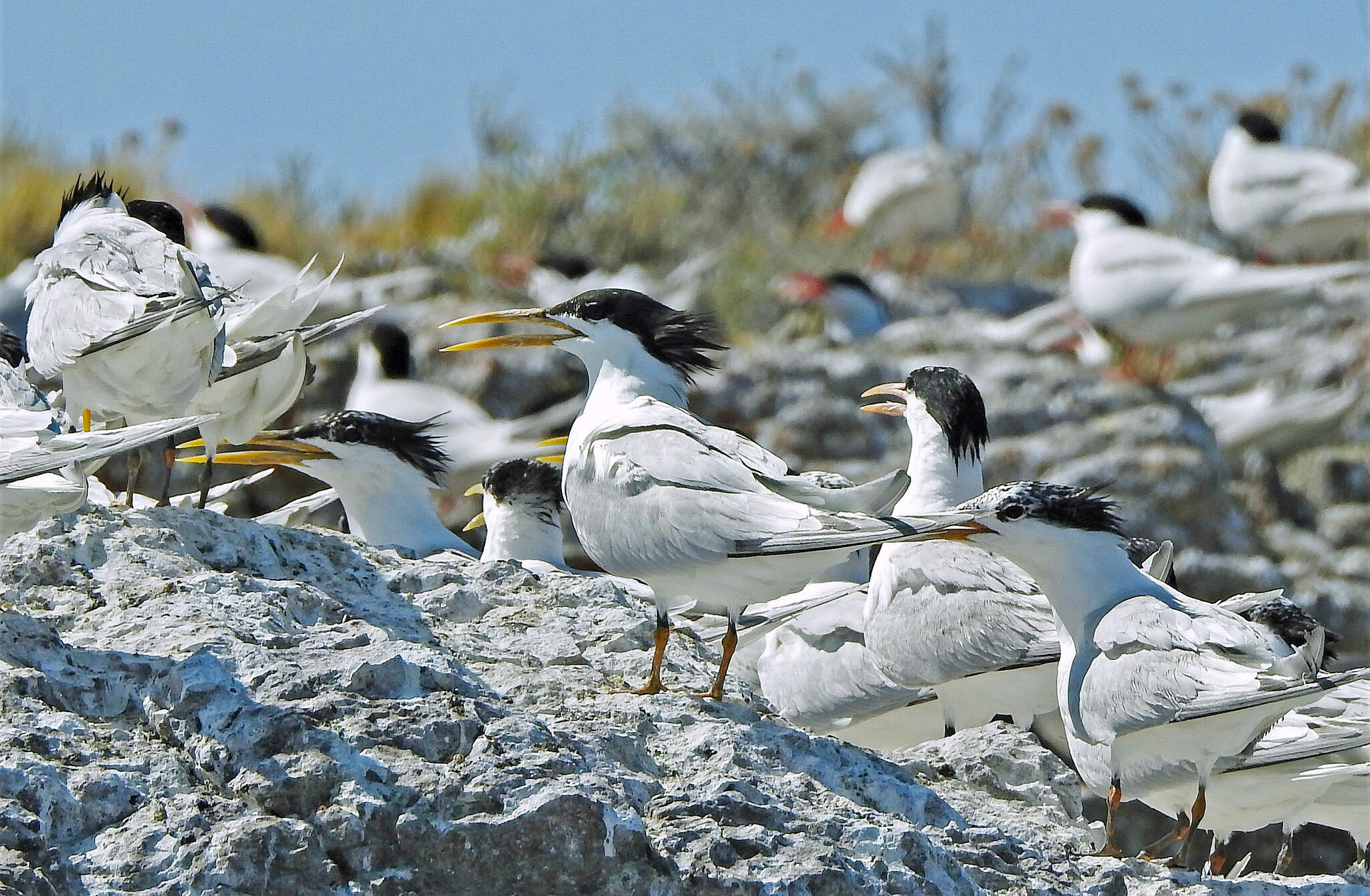
Breeding colony of T. a. eurygnathus on an islet off Puerto Deseado, Santa Cruz, southern Argentina

Cabot's terns apparently court and form pairs during spring migration before reaching the nesting grounds. Males make display flights or posture on the ground. The species nests in areas with sparse or no vegetation. The nest is a simple scrape made by both sexes; they may add a few pieces of shell or seaweed. The typical clutch size is one egg though two are not uncommon. The incubation period is about 24 days in the north and averages about 29 days in the far south. Both sexes incubate, and apparently share the duty equally after the first few days. Chicks are semi-precocial and can thermoregulate about five days after hatch. They depend on the parents for food; both parents provide it until fledging and usually the female alone after that. Nest defense is shared equally. Fledging occurs about 27 to 29 days after hatch.

=== Vocalization ===
As of early 2024 xeno-canto had 53 recordings of Cabot's tern from the Americas, and a further three of presumed Cabot's terns misclassified among the very many of Sandwich tern. The Cornell Lab of Ornithology's Macaulay Library has additional recordings. The species' main call has been described as kerr-ick, kjerr-it, keerik, and kreejik. It has a variety of other calls as well.

== Status ==
The IUCN follows HBW taxonomy so has not assessed Cabot's tern separately from Sandwich tern sensu lato. Disturbance of nesting colonies by humans appears to be the major threat to the species as a whole.

== Gallery ==
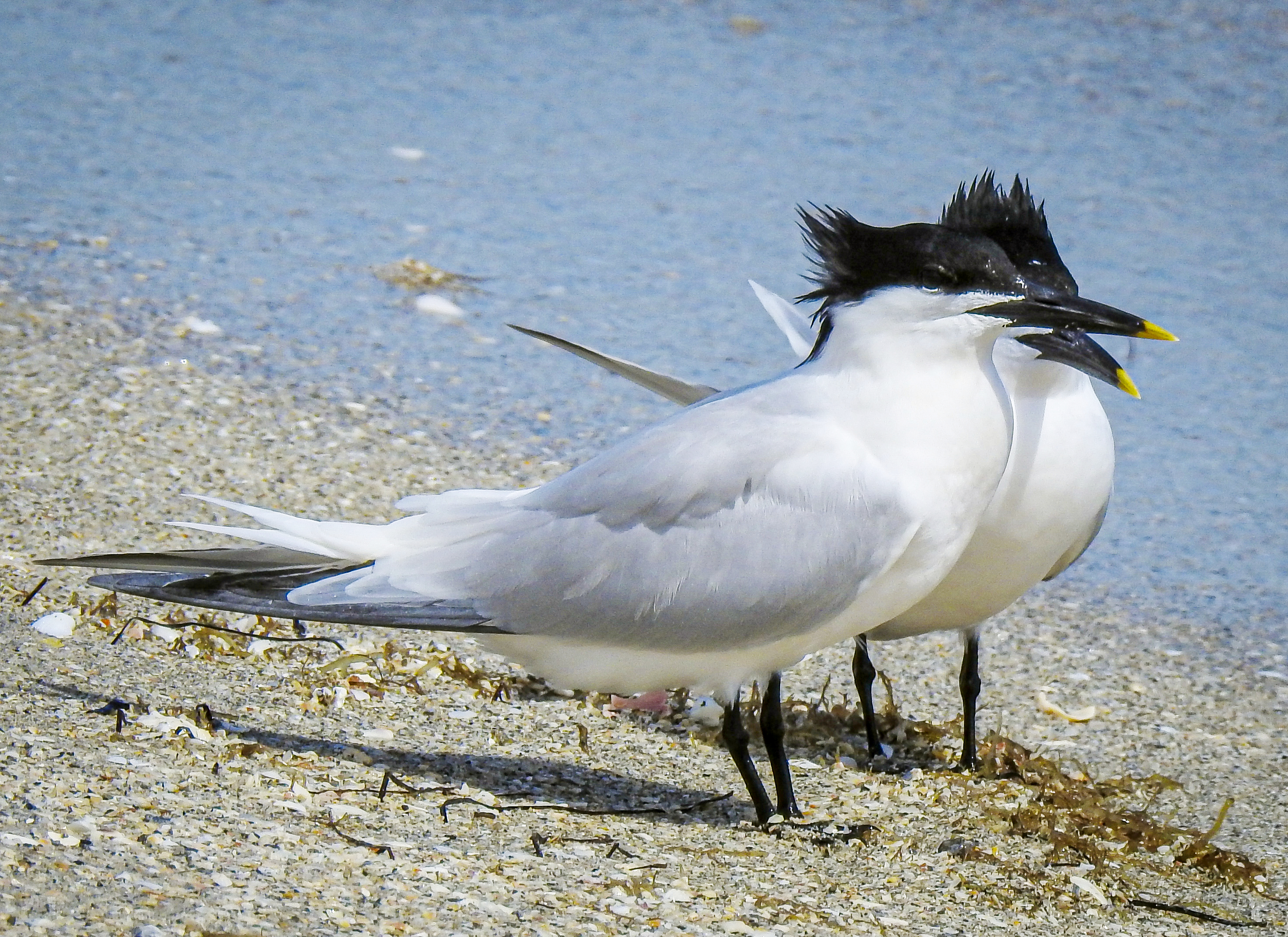
T. a. acuflavidus at Fort de Soto, Florida

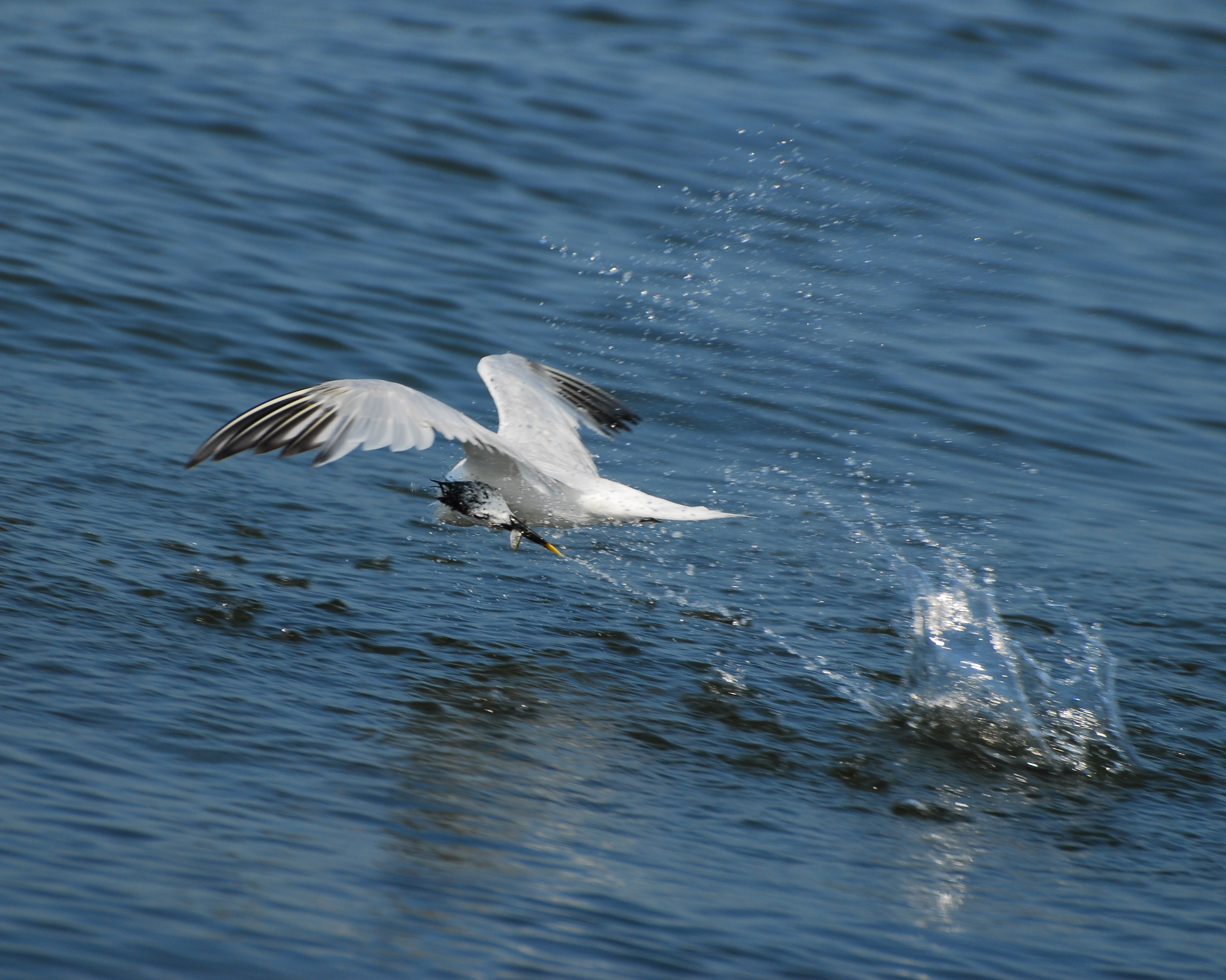
Fishing near Tampa Bay, Florida

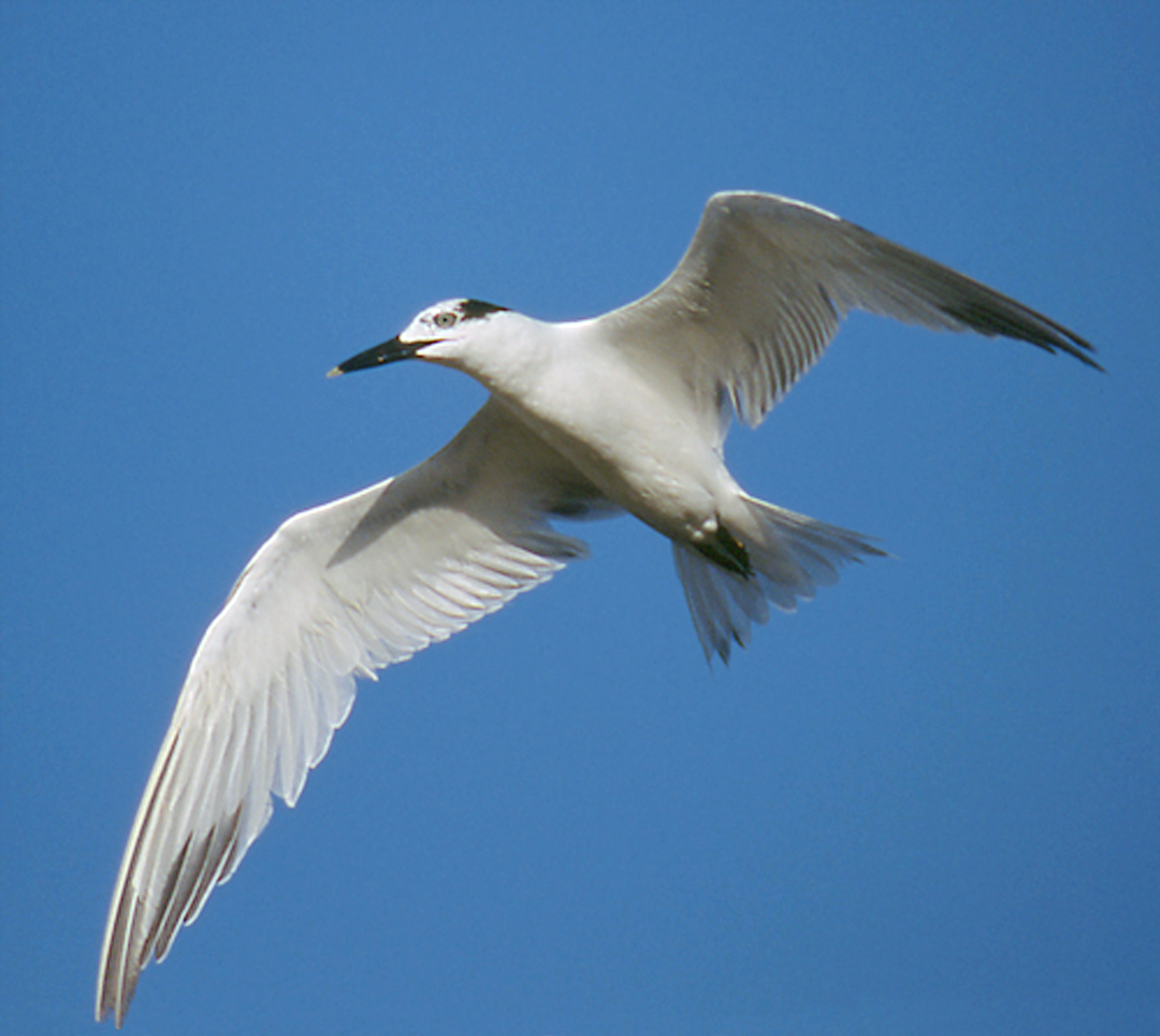
In flight, Sanibel, Florida

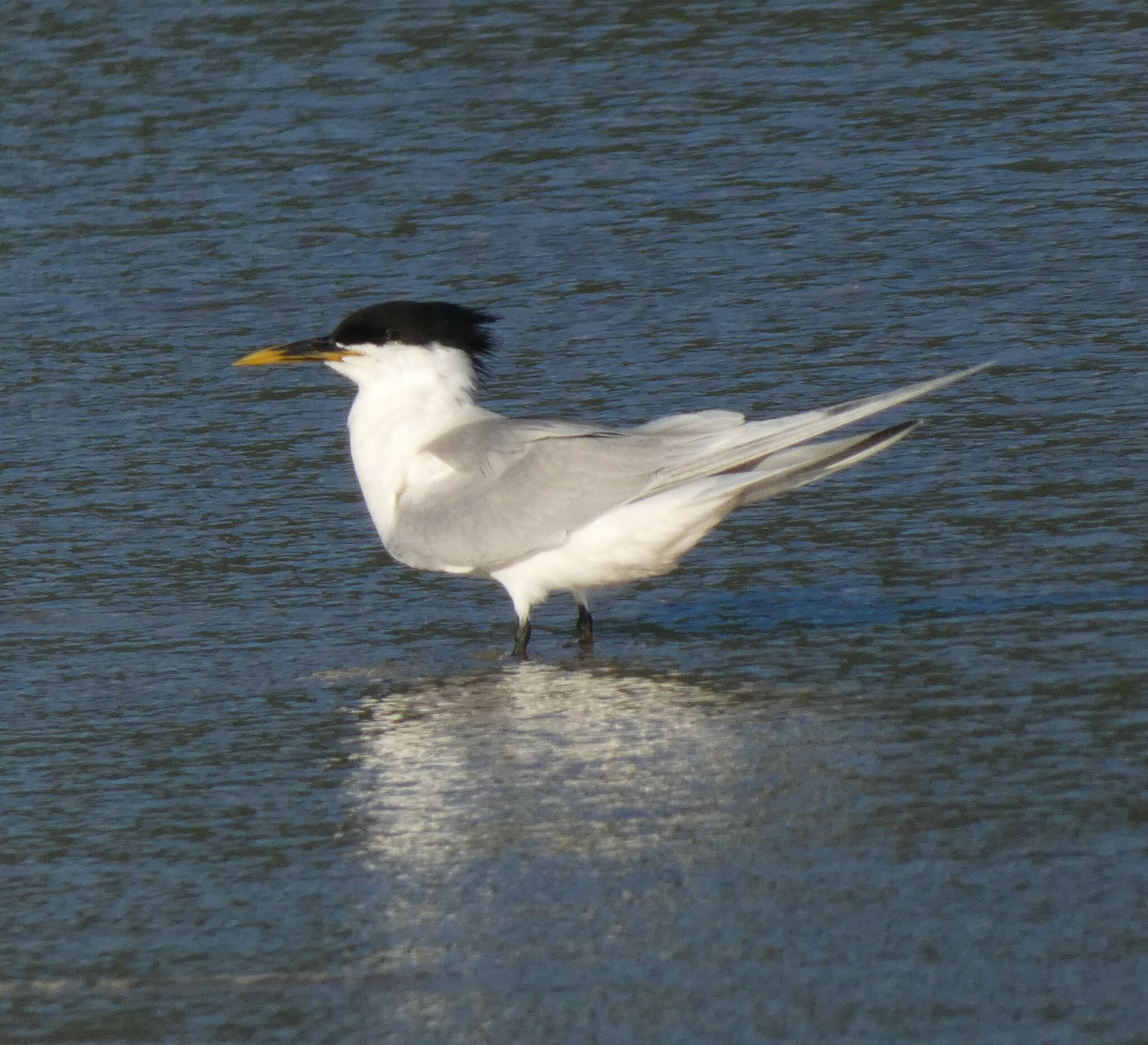
T. a. eurygnathus or intergrade with T. a. acuflavidus, with partially yellow bill. Santa Catarina, Brazil.

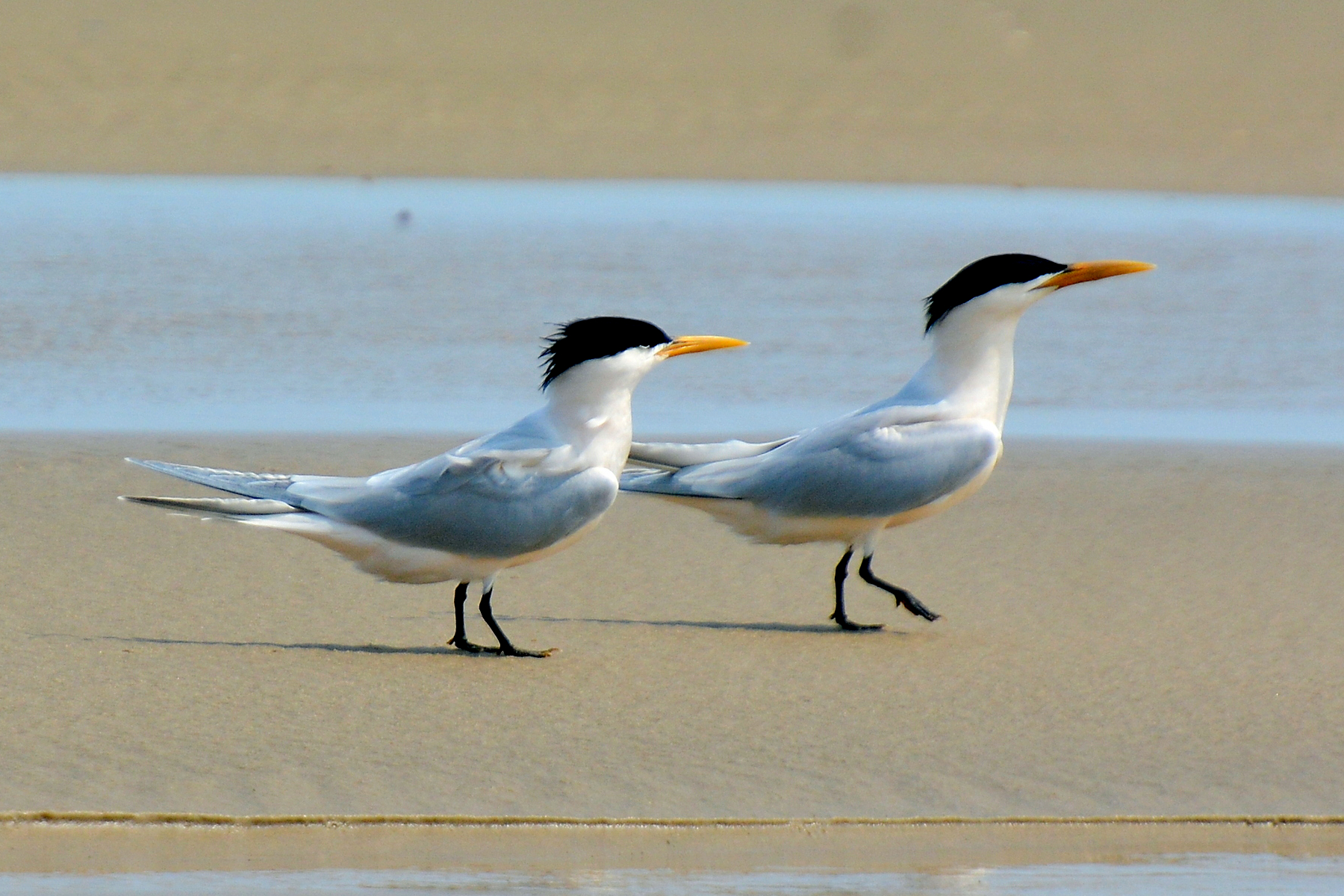
T. a. eurygnathus with fully yellow bills. Rio Grande do Sul, Brazil.
