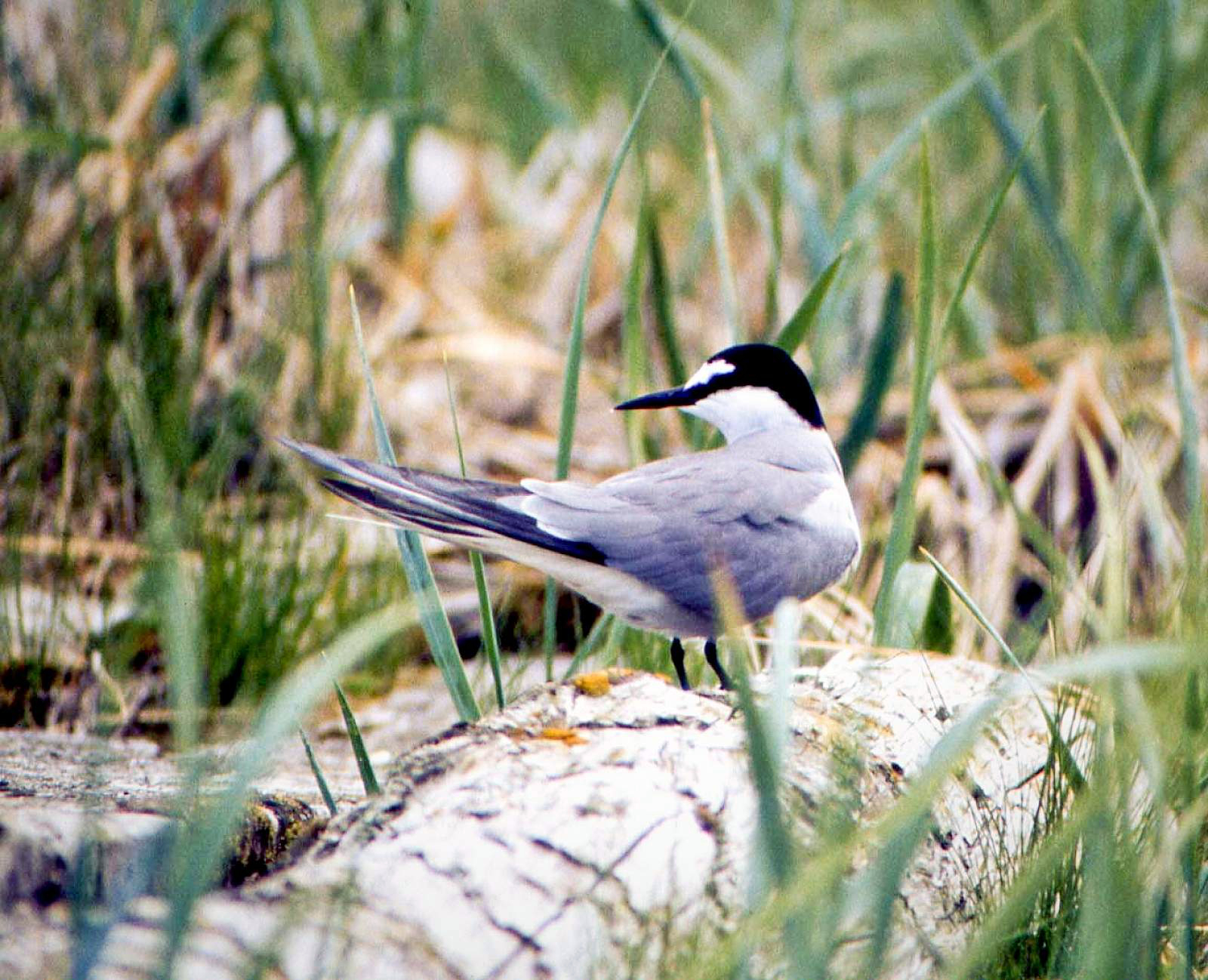

Conservation status
- Vulnerable (IUCN 3.1)

Scientific classification
- Kingdom: Animalia
- Phylum: Chordata
- Class: Aves
- Order: Charadriiformes
- Family: Laridae
- Genus: Onychoprion
- Species: O. aleuticus

Binomial name
- Onychoprion aleuticus (Baird, 1869)
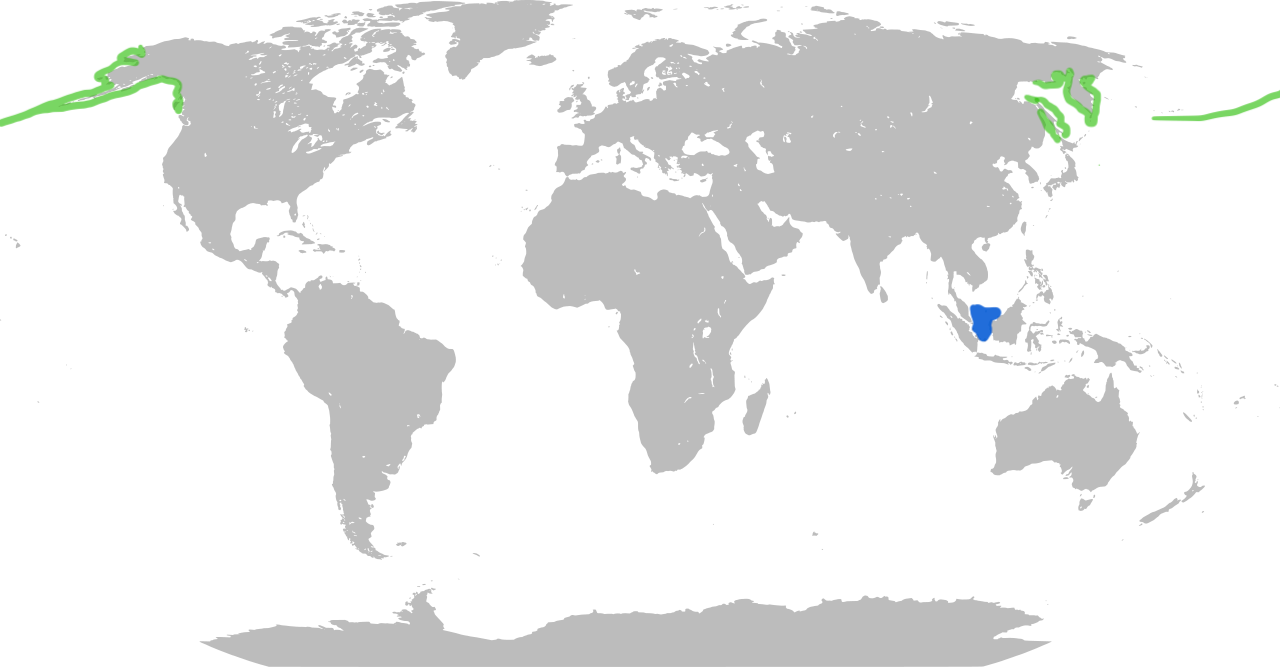
- Aleutian Tern Distribution Breeding Non-breeding

Synonyms
- Sterna aleutica Baird, 1869

= Aleutian tern =

Species of bird

The Aleutian tern (Onychoprion aleuticus) is a migratory bird living in the subarctic region of the globe most of the year. It is frequently associated with the Arctic tern, which it closely resembles. While both species have a black cap, the Aleutian tern may be distinguished by its white forehead (although juvenile Arctic terns also have white foreheads). During breeding season, the Arctic terns have bright red bills, feet, and legs while those of the Aleutian terns are black.

Onychoprion aleuticus has not been thoroughly studied yet. If its winter migratory range was completely unknown until the late 1980s; it is now known that many Aleutian terns spend the winter near the Equator in the western Pacific. The Aleutian tern breeds in wide-ranging coastal colonies only in Alaska and eastern Siberia. Although Alaskan and Siberian populations are not well monitored, both are thought to be in significant decline.

== Taxonomy ==
The Aleutian tern is in the family Laridae, a family of seabirds in the order Charadriiformes that includes the gulls, terns and skimmers. The generic name is from Ancient Greek onux, "claw" or "nail", and prion, "saw". The specific epithet aleuticus refers to the Aleutian Islands.

It was formerly named Sterna aleutica. Indeed, in his 1758 Systema Naturae, Linnaeus placed the terns in the genus Sterna. However, a phylogenetic analysis found that the species in the Onychoprion clade, which includes O. aleuticus, O. fuscatus (sooty tern), and O. anaethetus (bridled tern), are related only distantly to the "typical" terns retained in a much-restricted Sterna. Still, in broader terms the genera Onychoprion and Sterna are sisters. Relationships between various tern species, and between the terns and the other Charadriiformes, were formerly difficult to resolve because of a poor fossil record and the misidentification of some finds.

== Description ==
The Aleutian tern is medium-sized tern (32–39 cm (13–15 in) long), with a 75–80 cm (30–31 in) wingspan, a short pointed bill and a long, deeply forked tail. It weighs 84–140 g (2.9–5.0 oz).

=== Plumage ===
Breeding adult and juvenile are the only plumages likely to be encountered in North America. Breeding adult (definitive alternate plumage) has a white forehead, a black cap, a mid-grey mantle with darkish grey underparts, and white rump and tail. Its underwing is whitish, with dark-tipped primaries and a diagnostic dark bar on the secondaries. The Aleutian tern has a black bill as well as black legs. There are no significant differences between the male and the female.

The plumage of the non-breeding adult (definitive basic plumage) is poorly known. It is thought to be similar to plumage of the breeding adult. It has white underparts, a white speckled crown, and a gray tail with white sides. Whereas the forehead bar disappears in winter, the dark secondary bar remains.

Lee described juveniles with a white collar, extensive white forehead, white underparts, and gray tail with white outer web of outer tail-feather. They usually do not have clear dark bar on their secondaries.

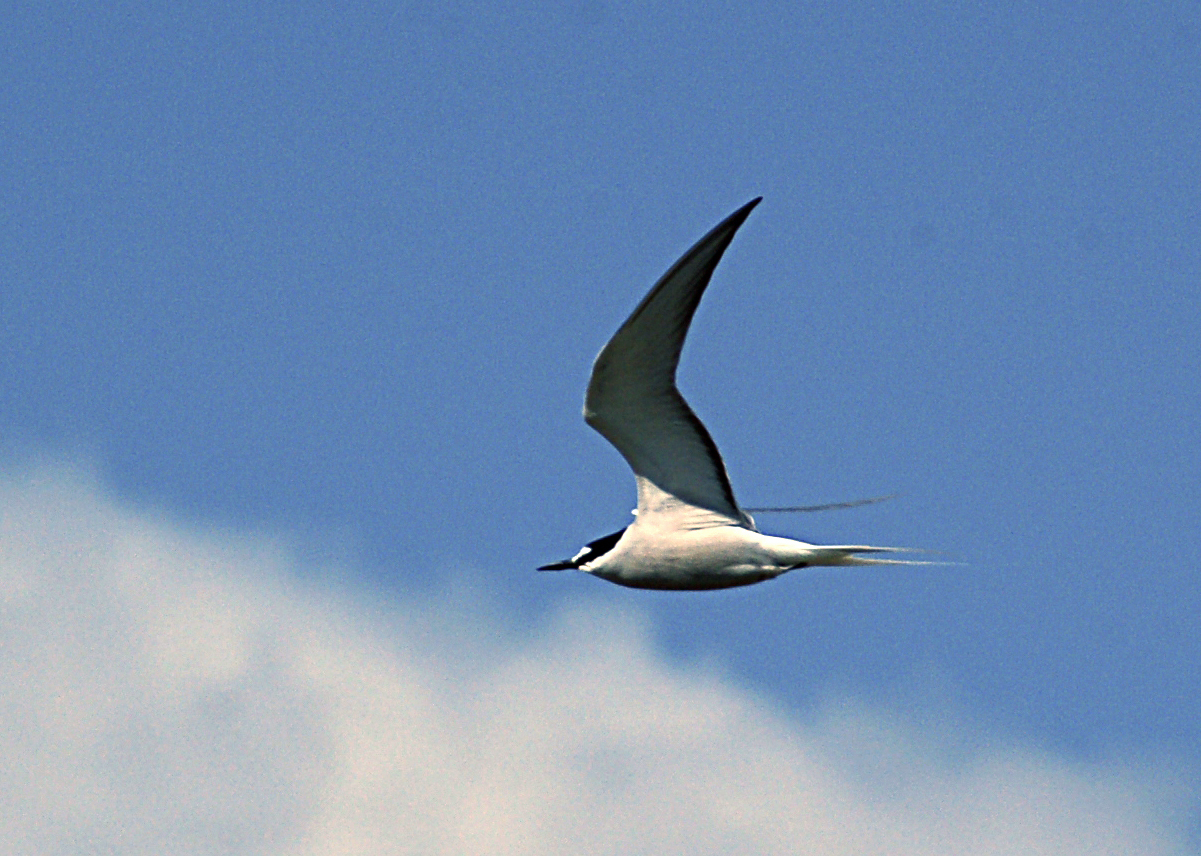
Adult Onychoprion aleuticus in breeding plumage in Nome, Alaska.

Molt strategies are very poorly known in the Aleutian tern but are presumably similar to those of other medium-sized, northern-breeding, migratory terns, such as the much better-studied common tern. The Aleutian tern exhibits a Complex Alternate Strategy:

Plumage	Period of the Year
Juvenile (First Basic)	Jul–Oct
Formative	Oct–Mar
First Alternate	Mar–Aug
Second Basic	Sep–Feb
Second Alternate	Sep–Feb
Definitive Basic	Sep–Feb
Definitive Alternate	Mar–Sep

=== Voice ===
The Aleutian tern is associated with different calls reported in the literature. Their call can be distinguished from the common tern ones, since it has a higher pitch and is characterized by a soft and rolling whistled tone.

The most distinctive sound is the choppy "chif-chif-chu-ak" described by Olsen and Larsson in 1995, less harsh than the sustained note of the Arctic tern. Another distinctive sound of the Aleutian tern is a prolonged "whee-hee-hee-hee" stressed on the first syllable. Aleutian terns also have a call that is similar to call of red-necked phalarope (Phalaropus lobatus), which is a short, sharp "chit", possibly uttered during social contact.

The Aleutian tern is generally silent while incubating.

== Distribution and habitat ==
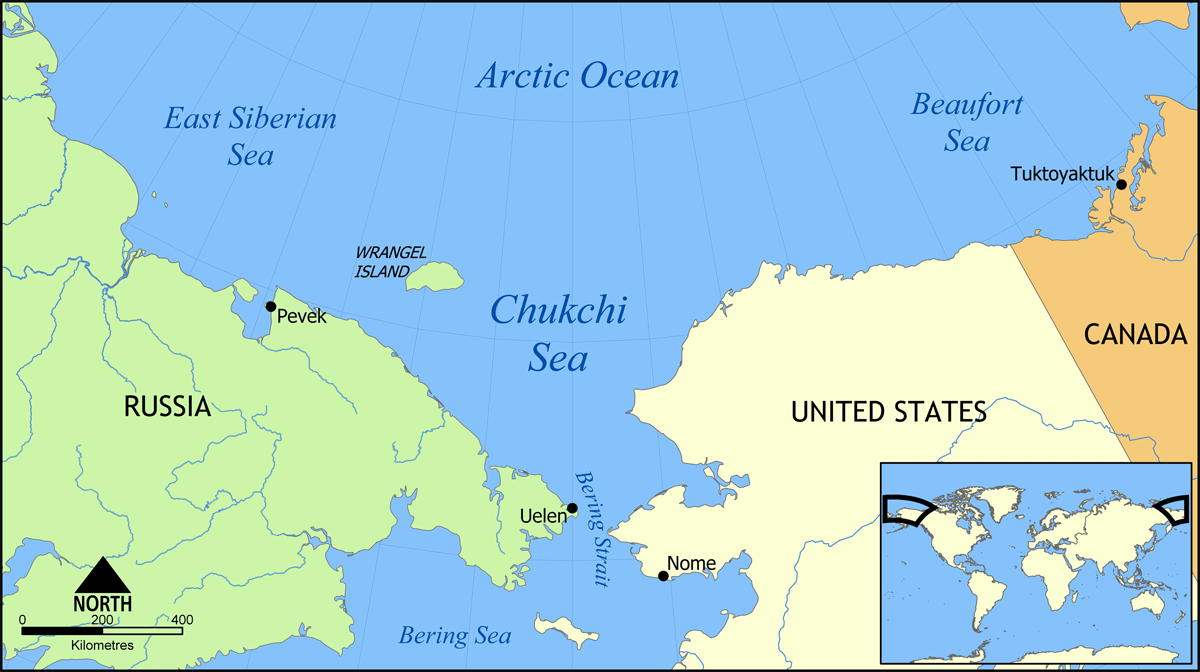
Map of the Chukchi Sea (Western Alaska).

During breeding season, the colonies gather along Pacific coastlines of Alaska and Russia. More precisely, breeding colonies have been located along the coast of the Chukchi Sea (western Alaska), on the Seward Peninsula and Yukon-Kuskokwim River Delta along the Alaska Peninsula, in the Aleutian Islands, in the Kodiak Archipelago, on the Kenai Peninsula and Copper River delta, and along the Gulf of Alaska. The current [when?] worldwide minimum breeding population has been estimated at 31 000 birds, with most colonies occurring in the Siberian region of Russia (25 602 birds in 89 colonies) and the remaining 18% occurring in Alaska (5 529 birds in 111 colonies). However, within the last decade, there have been reports of colony declines and disappearances at individual sites in Alaska.

This species is strongly migratory, and although the wintering range is poorly known, it is believed to lie off Indonesia and Malaysia. Small flocks of the species have been increasingly sighted in coastal areas around Hong Kong in spring and fall, around Singapore and Indonesia between October and April, and in coastal waters of Java, Bali and Sulawesi during December. The regular appearance of Aleutian terns in fall off Hong Kong suggests one possible route for southbound migrants. The Aleutian tern stands out from its congeners because it is the only species to show an annual migratory behaviour between a subarctic breeding zone and tropical wintering areas in the South Pacific. Only a very small number of Charadriiformes breeding in Alaska appear to have a connection to East Asia. In December 2017, they were spotted for the first time on Australia's eastern coast.

=== Habitat ===
The Aleutian tern usually lives in partially vegetated sandy beaches and grassy meadows, mossy boglands and marshes, either on isolated rocky islands or along coasts, often near river mouths. The Aleutian tern is pelagic when it is not breeding.

=== Status ===
Trends in the Aleutian tern distribution indicate that overall, the species seems to undergo rapid declines over generations. Indeed, the numbers at known colonies in Alaska have declined 8.1% annually since 1960, which corresponds to 92.9% over three generations, with large colonies experiencing greater declines than small colonies. The Aleutian tern has therefore been listed as a "Vulnerable" species. Precise factors of declines are unclear but likely include habitat modification, predation, egg harvesting and human disturbance. Moreover, wintering area in Southeast Asia could be related to breeding population declines because this region undergoes several ecological stresses from unregulated fishing, coastal development, and pollution. Aleutian terns are very sensitive to disturbance at colonies and may seasonally or even permanently abandon their colonies in response to human disturbance.

=== Conservation ===
The Aleutian tern has been designated as a species of concern by several agencies and NGOs (Alaska Department of Fish and Game, Audubon Alaska, U.S. Fish and Wildlife Service, The North American Waterbird Conservation Plan). In 2007, an Aleutian tern Working Group was organized in Alaska in order to examine the necessity to develop an accurate population estimation method and therefore prioritizing the management of the species and the identification of its migration pathway. In 2010, they began to deploy geolocators on Aleutians terns from colonies in Alaska. The lack of data on breeding biology and ecological behaviours limits the development of conservation actions for the species. Further research should focus on the monitoring of populations and colonies in Alaska, Russia and South Pacific regions and the understanding of the main causes of the recent decline of the species.

== Behaviour ==
=== Breeding and Parental Behaviour ===
Aleutian terns breed in colonies, and are site-faithful if their habitat is sufficiently stable. Pairs form on the breeding area, shortly after arrival. The pairs build the nest during the last half of May and first half of June, shortly before egg-laying. The typical clutch size is 2 eggs (occasionally 1 or 3). The nest is a shallow depression usually built on low vegetation such as mosses, lichens, field horsetail, cottongrass, hairgrass or coastal bluegrass. Both parents incubate the eggs and feed the chicks, although the female does more incubating and less fishing than her partner. Aleutian terns are reported to spend less time brooding chicks than do Arctic terns; consequently, Aleutian tern mortality rate is higher during the chick stage.

The eggs typically have an elongate ovate shape and range from 40–46 mm (1.6–1.8 in) length. Their color ranges from a clay/olive green to a honey yellow, they tend to be darker than eggs of other terns. Distinctive large and smaller black spots are irregularly marked over the egg. After a three-week incubation period, the eggs hatch from early June until late July. Several days after hatching, young birds move to taller vegetation before moving with adults to staging areas along coast (semiprecocial juvenils). After 4–5 weeks, the chicks start fledging.

Aleutian terns are easily disturbed from nests. As soon as an intrusion is detected, the adults fly off the nest. They are much slower at returning to nests after being disturbed than are Arctic terns, taking up to 30 min to return. It sometimes nests among Arctic terns, which, like most white terns, are fiercely defensive of their nest and young and will attack large predators. The Aleutian tern, however, is not aggressive in defence of its nests or young.

=== Courtship ===
The courtship display of the Aleutian tern has never been thoroughly described, but all terns are thought to display the same strategies of courtship: ceremonial "fish flight," "low flight," "high flight," and ground "parade".

The Aleutian tern pre-courtship flights have been described in literature. Beginning on May, several terns participate in a synchronous ascending spiral flight, before the beginning of courtship in early June. Pairs do not always copulate at the colony; indeed, Mickelson et al. observed Aleutian terns that were courting on surrounding beaches of the Copper River Delta (Alaska), away from colonies.

=== Diet and Foraging ===
Aleutian terns primarily feed on small fish, but their diet also includes crustaceans, insects and zooplankton. They forage mostly by flying, hovering low over water and swooping down or surface-dipping into the water to take their food from the surface. Only contact- and surface-dipping have been observed, even in places where other species have been seen plunge-diving. Indeed, terns are considered as poor swimmers because of their small webs and short legs. Aleutian terns usually forage in shallow water, including tidal rips, along rivers, and over inshore marine waters. Occasionally adults and fledgling juveniles catch insects by hawking over freshwater ponds. This species can forage in nearshore marine waters up to 11 km (6.8 mi) offshore from Seward Peninsula, and up to 50 km (31 mi) offshore from other colonies. Individuals occasionally attempt to steal fish from other adults bringing fish to chicks. Aleutian terns are skilled flyers and can take insects out of the air while flying.

=== Flight ===
Aleutian terns fly very gracefully; their flight is strong and undeviating, and their wing beats are slower than those of Arctic and common terns. They mostly fly above the ocean rather than above mainland. Similarly to other terns species, the Aleutian tern walks relatively slowly because of its short legs.

=== Social behaviour ===
Aleutian terns are highly social. Usually, their nests are settled within loose mixed-species colonies. Monospecific colonies or isolated pairs are rare. Colony size usually ranges from 4–150 pairs, but up to 700 pairs on Sakhalin Island (Siberia). The Aleutian terns frequently nests with Arctic terns in Alaska and common terns in Siberia. It also happens that colonies of mew gull (Larus canus) are close to the Aleutian tern nests.

Less aggressive than Arctic terns, Onychoprion aleuticus is frequently chased at colonies and often excluded from mixed-species foraging areas by Arctic terns. The latter can also jeopardize the Aleutian tern foraging activity by stealing its food.

== Predators and parasites ==
Eggs and chicks of the Aleutian tern have been reported to be preyed on by the following list of predators:

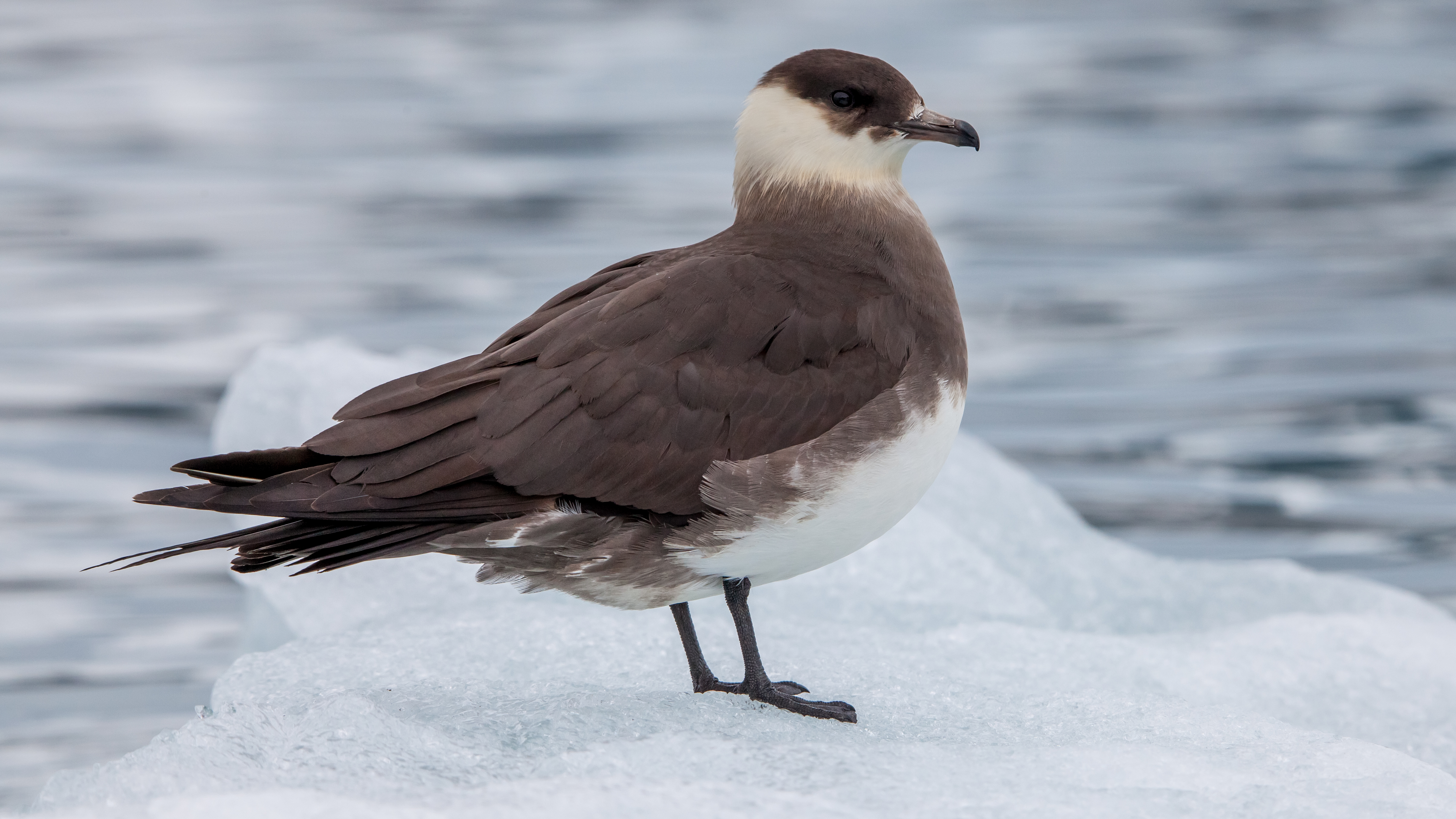
Parasitic jaeger on an ice floe, Svalbard.

- Arctic fox (Vulpes lagopus)
- Coyote (Canis latrans)
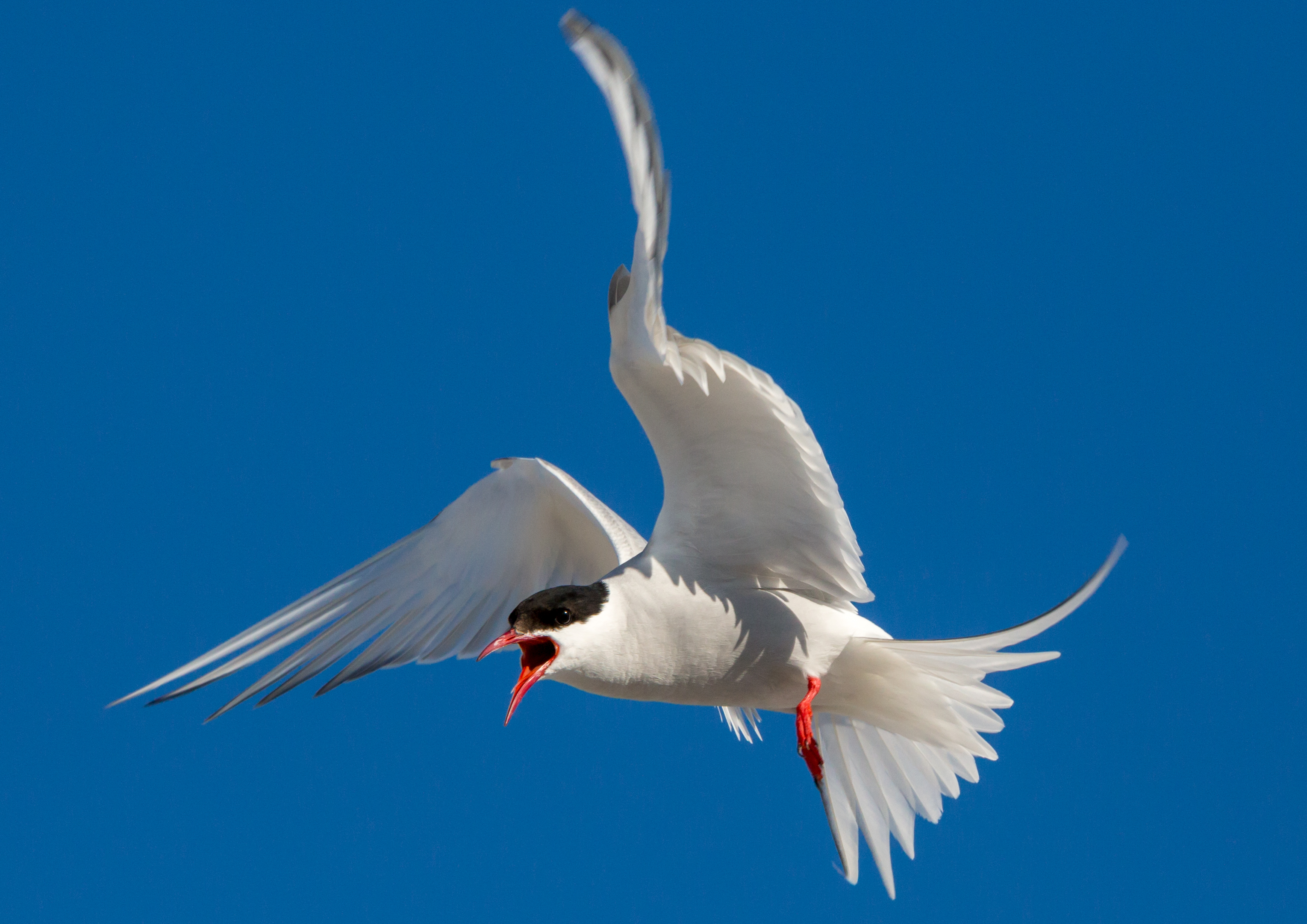
  Arctic tern attacking to protect its offspring, Svalbard.
- Dog (Canis familiaris)
- North American river otter (Lontra canadensis)
- Weasel (Mustela spp.)
- Brown bear (Ursus arctos)
- Brown rat (Rattus norvegicus)
- Bald eagle (Haliaeetus leucocephalus)
- Parasitic jaeger (Stercorarius parasiticus)
- Glaucous-winged gull (Larus glaucescens)
- Short-eared owl (Asio flammeus)
- Black-billed magpie (Pica pica)
- Northwestern crow (Corvus caurinus)
- Common raven (Corvus corax)

If Aleutian terns frequently fly high over the colony when disturbed by humans, they can nonetheless aggressively chase avian predators (but not as aggressively as Arctic terns do). Some chicks may also be killed by Arctic terns; however, breeding success in the species is lower in the absence of Arctic terns as they often rely on their aggressivity to chase potential predators from the colony.

== See also ==
- Wildlife of Alaska
