= Lacepede Islands =

Islands of the Kimberley coast of Western Australia

Coordinates: 16°51.3′S 122°8.2′E

Location of the Lacepede Islands in the Indian Ocean

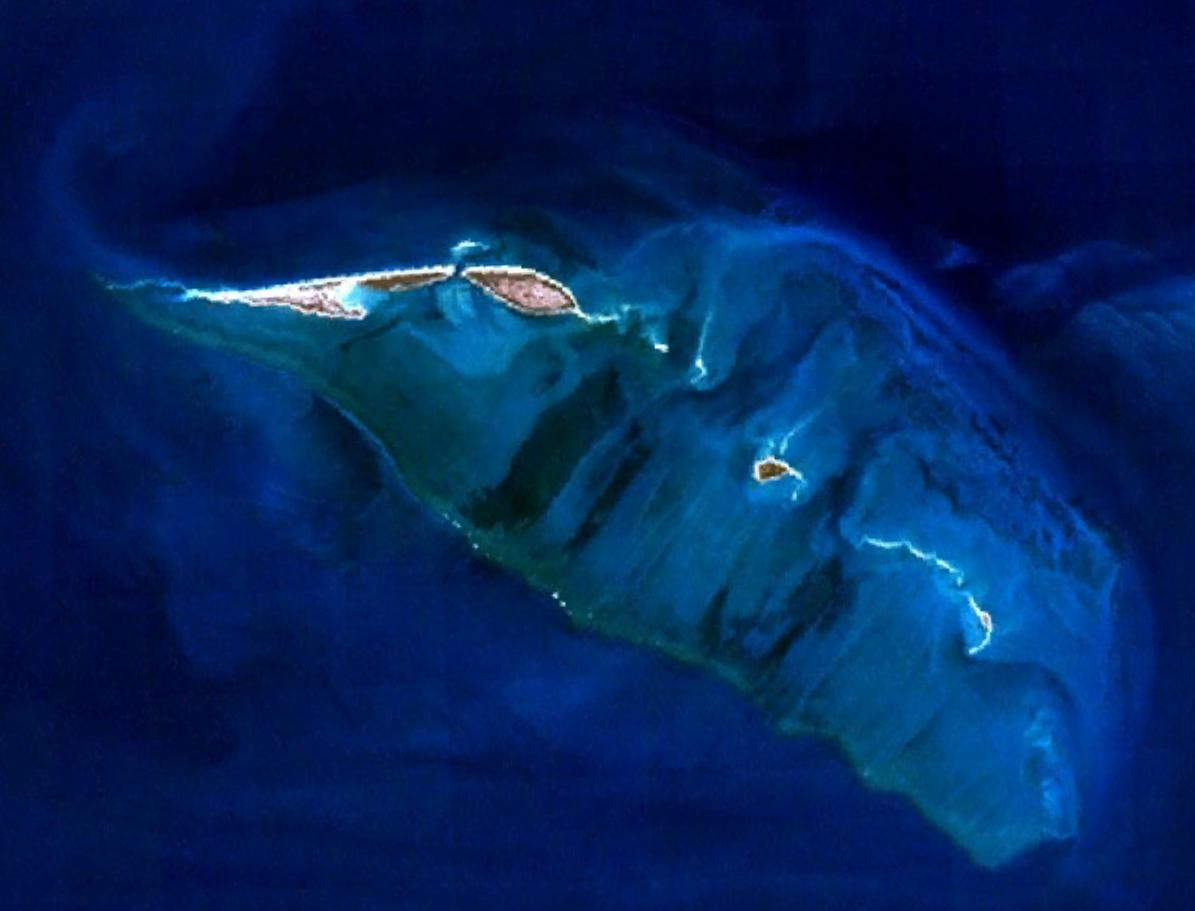
Satellite image of the Lacepedes

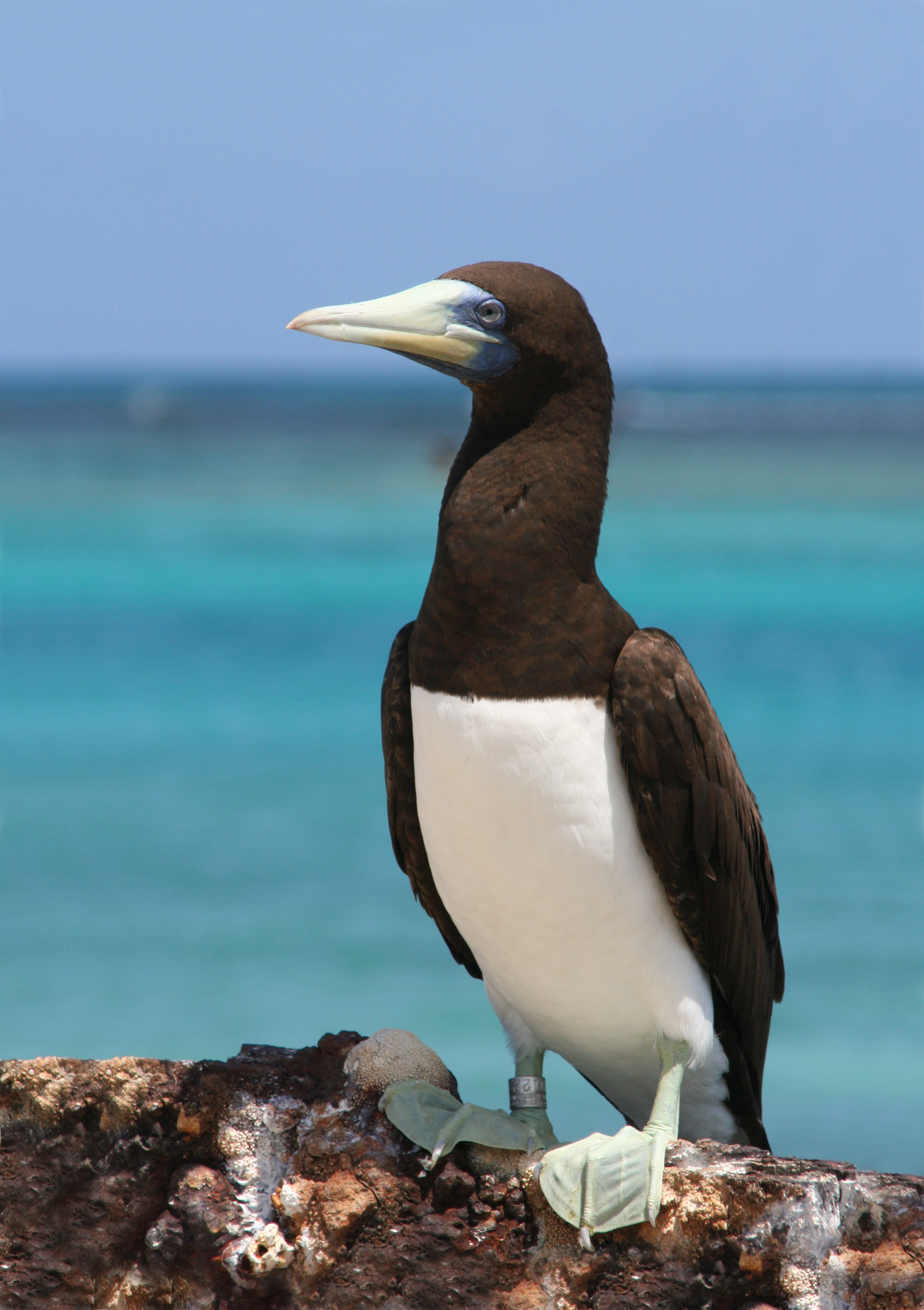
The islands are an important breeding site for brown boobies

The Lacepede Islands, sometimes referred to simply as the Lacepedes, are a group of four islands lying off the Kimberley coast of Western Australia, about 120 kilometres (75 miles) north of Broome.

They are about 30 km (19 mi) from the Dampier Peninsula, from which they are separated by the Lacepede Channel. They are important for their breeding seabirds.

== Description ==
The Lacepede group (originally named Napoleon, Grant and Victoria islands) is a 12-kilometre (7.5 mi) long chain of four islands known as West Island, Middle Island, Sandy Island and East Island. They are all small, low spits of coarse sand and coral rubble, lying atop a platform coral reef. They are treeless but support low vegetation. Average annual rainfall is about 750 mm. East Island is the site of the East Island Lighthouse.

== Environment ==
The Lacepede Islands are an A-class reserve managed by the Department of Environment and Conservation. Rats were eradicated in 1986, allowing the recolonisation of the islands by nesting seabirds. They are Western Australia's most important breeding habitat for green turtles. There has been a possible sighting of an Omura's whale, one of the most recently described and least known baleen whales.

=== Birds ===
The islands have been identified by BirdLife International as an Important Bird Area (IBA) because they support over 1% of the world populations of brown boobies and roseate terns. The breeding colony of brown boobies, of up to 18,000 breeding pairs, is possibly the largest in the world. Up to 20,000 roseate terns have been recorded there.

Other birds breeding on the islands include masked boobies, Australian pelicans, lesser frigatebirds, eastern reef egrets, silver gulls, crested, bridled and lesser crested terns, common noddies, and pied and sooty oystercatchers. Visiting waders include grey-tailed tattlers, ruddy turnstones, great knots and greater sand plovers.

== History ==
The island group was named by Nicolas Baudin on 5 August 1801 during his expedition around Australia, in honour of French naturalist Bernard Germain de Lacepède, who described several Australian fish species. The name of the islands was first charted on the Freycinet Map of 1811.

=== Guano mining ===
In the 19th century, the Lacepede Islands were among numerous islands off the Western Australian coast that were mined for guano. Although much of the guano mined was by Western Australian industry, there was also extensive unauthorised mining by trading ships from other countries, especially the United States. A Melbourne company, Messrs. Poole, Picken and Co., had been authorised by the Western Australian government to load guano, and had been charged a royalty of 10 shillings per ton. On 26 June 1876, a dispute arose when Gilbert Carver Roberts, on behalf of Samuel Lord, an American merchant and honorary US vice consul in Melbourne, landed from the French-flagged barque de Forcade la Roquette, disputed a demand that he pay a levy for mining and attempted to evict the Victorian guano miners licensed by the Western Australian government. Charles Robert Baldwin planted the United States flag on one of the islands, claiming the island group for that country in accordance with the United States Guano Islands Act that empowered U.S. citizens to take possession of uninhabited islands more than a league (three miles) offshore from any country, so long as they had not been formally claimed. This action, known as the "American Incident" or "Lacepede Islands Incident", sparked a diplomatic and political row, which was eventually resolved by Captain Alexander of the de Forcade la Roquette paying the levy and a fine, and the Western Australian government enacting legislation requiring all guano mining to be licensed, with severe penalties for transgressions. In May 1877 Governor Robinson received advice that US President Ulysses Grant had repudiated Lord's annexation. The extraction of guano was wound down in 1879 when the schooner Aurora removed the machinery used for extraction. The manager Captain R McEachern estimated that the quantity of guano left on the islands was less than 2000 tons.

=== Blackbirding ===
The Lacepede Islands are also known to have been used by blackbirders, as a place to maroon kidnapped Aboriginal people before signing them up to work in various industries, such as the pearling industry. The government caretaker James Kelly was dismissed in March 1884 for taking bribes from pearlers and allowing the Lacepedes to be used as an illegal depot for Aborigines kidnapped for pearl diving. In one confirmed case Edward Chapman from Cossack was cautioned for kidnapping aborigines from the Beagle Bay community and marooning them on the Lacepedes.
