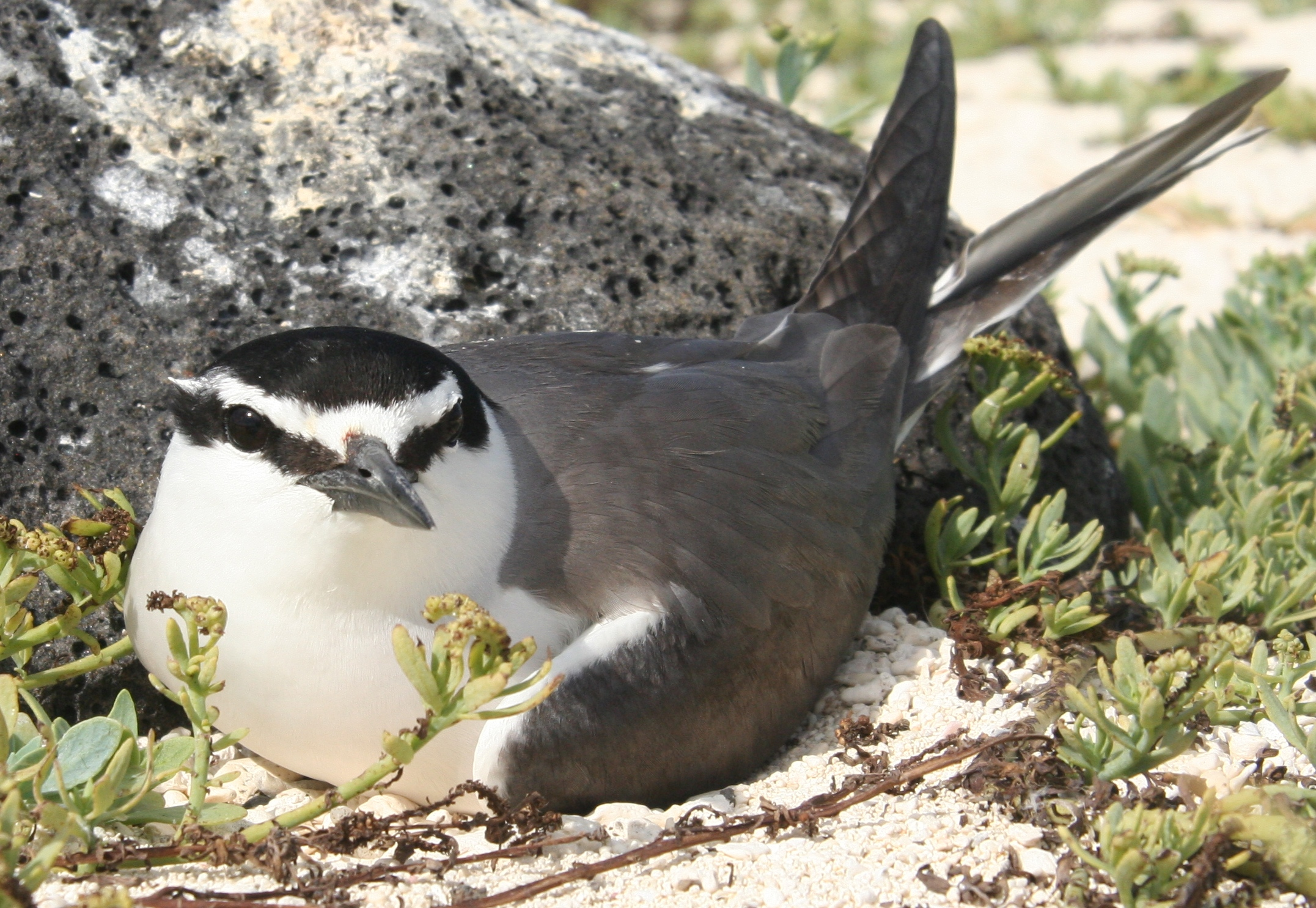

Conservation status
- Least Concern (IUCN 3.1)

Scientific classification
- Kingdom: Animalia
- Phylum: Chordata
- Class: Aves
- Order: Charadriiformes
- Family: Laridae
- Genus: Onychoprion
- Species: O. lunatus

Binomial name
- Onychoprion lunatus (Peale, 1849)

Synonyms
- Onychoprion lunata (lapsus); Sterna lunata Peale, 1848

= Spectacled tern =

Species of bird

The spectacled tern (Onychoprion lunatus), also known as the grey-backed tern, is a seabird in the family Laridae.

== Description ==
A close relative of the bridled and sooty terns (with which it is sometimes confused), the spectacled tern is less common than the other members of its genus and it has been studied less. The three species, along with the Aleutian tern were recently split into a new genus Onychoprion from Sterna (Bridge et al., 2005). They resemble the sooty tern but with a grey back instead of a black one. Their breast and underparts are white, and they have a black eye line from the bill to the back of the head.

== Distribution and habitat ==
The spectacled tern breeds on islands of the tropical Pacific Ocean. At the northern end of its distribution it nests in the Northwestern Hawaiian Islands (with the largest population being Lisianski Island) and two small islets off Oahu, in the east as far as the Tuamotu Islands, with other colonies in the Society Islands, the Line Islands, Phoenix Islands, Mariana Islands and American Samoa. There are unconfirmed reports of breeding as far south as Fiji, and as far east as Easter Island. Little is known about the populations outside of Hawaii. Outside of the breeding season the species is partly migratory, with birds from the Hawaiian Islands flying south. It is thought that birds in other parts of the Pacific are also migratory, and will disperse as far as Papua New Guinea, the Philippines, and Easter Island.
