= Lacepede Channel =

Sound in north west Western Australia

Coordinates: 16°55′S 122°13′E

The Lacepede Channel separates the Lacepede Islands from the Dampier Peninsula in north-west Western Australia. It is nominally located at 16° 55' S 122° 13' E.
