= East Island Lighthouse (Western Australia) =

- Location: Lacepede Islands, Western Australia
- Coordinates: 16°54′07.8″S 122°11′52.2″E

Tower
- Constructed: 1984
- Foundation: concrete base
- Construction: metal skeletal tower
- Automated: 1984
- Height: 23 metres (75 ft)
- Shape: square pyramidal tower with balcony and lantern
- Markings: white tower
- Power source: solar power
- Operator: Australian Maritime Safety Authority

Light
- Focal height: 33 metres (108 ft)
- Characteristic: FI (2) W 10s.

East Island Lighthouse is a lighthouse on East Island in the Lacepede Islands off the north west coast of Western Australia.

First commissioned in 1984, it is a 23-metre (75 ft) high lattice metal tower, with the light's focal plane positioned at 33 metres (108 ft) above sea level. The light characteristic is two flashes every ten seconds.

== See also ==
- List of lighthouses in Australia
