= East Island (Lacepede Islands) =

Island in Western Australia

East Island is an island within the Lacepede Islands group, which sits about 30 kilometres (20 mi) off the coast of the Dampier Peninsula in north-west Western Australia. It is located at 16°54′S 122°11′E. It is the site of the East Island Lighthouse. It forms part of the Lacepede Islands Important Bird Area (IBA), so identified by BirdLife International because of its importance for breeding seabirds.

East Island was originally named Grant Island by 19th century guano miners, after US President Ulysses Grant.
