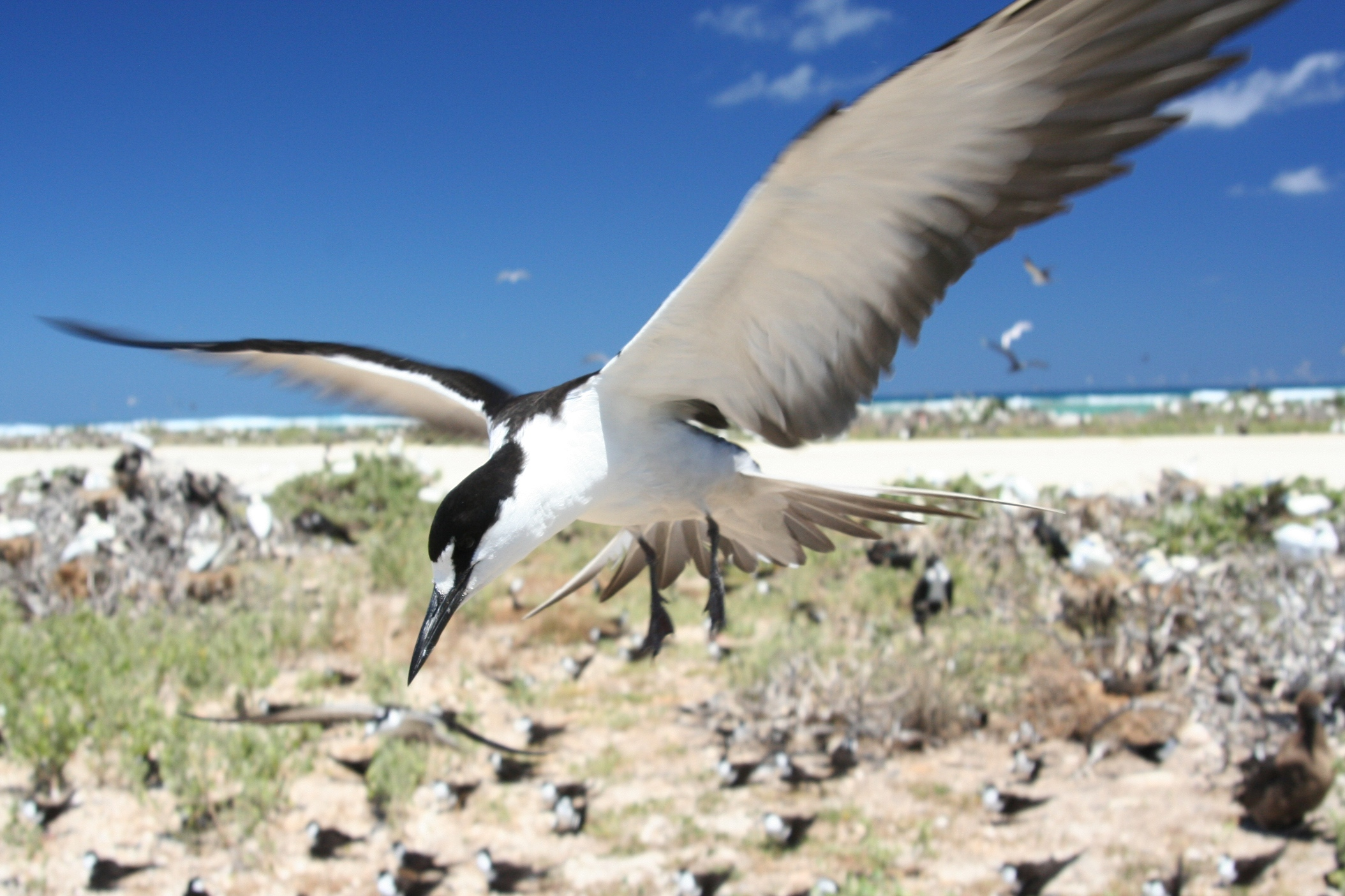
- Sooty tern Onychoprion fuscatus

Scientific classification
- Kingdom: Animalia
- Phylum: Chordata
- Class: Aves
- Order: Charadriiformes
- Family: Laridae
- Subfamily: Sterninae
- Genus: Onychoprion; Wagler, 1832

Type species
- Sterna serrata

Species
- Onychoprion lunatus Onychoprion anaethetus Onychoprion fuscatus Onychoprion aleuticus

= Onychoprion =

Genus of birds

Onychoprion is a genus of four species of terns in the family Laridae. The genus name is from Ancient Greek onux, "claw" or "nail", and prion, "saw". As a group, they have been variously called "brown-winged terns" or "brown-backed terns", though only one species is actually brown; the other three are dark grey or black.

== Species ==
Although the genus Onychoprion was first described in 1832 by Johann Georg Wagler, the species in the genus were generally retained within the larger genus Sterna, the genus that holds most terns, until a study in 2005 showed that this treatment was paraphyletic, with these four species less closely related to typical Sterna terns, than several other terns long treated in other genera like Chlidonias and Larosterna.

Onychoprion diverged early from other terns about 16–18 million years ago, with only the very different noddies (Anous and Gygis) diverging earlier. Within the genus, Aleutian tern is the most divergent, splitting off from the rest about ten million years ago; then sooty tern diverged about seven to eight million years ago, and finally bridled and spectacled terns diverged from each other about three million years ago.

Three of the four species are tropical, and one has a sub-polar breeding range. The sooty tern has a pan-tropical distribution; the bridled tern also breeds across the Tropical Atlantic and Indian Ocean but in the central Pacific it is replaced by the spectacled tern. The Aleutian tern breeds around Alaska and Siberia but winters in the tropics around South East Asia.

Genus Onychoprion – Wagler, 1832 – 4 species
Common name	Scientific name and subspecies	Range	Size and ecology	IUCN status and estimated population
Aleutian tern	Onychoprion aleuticus (Baird, 1869) Monotypic	Easternmost Siberia and Western Alaska, wintering south to northeastern Australia	Size: Habitat: Diet:	VU
Sooty tern	Onychoprion fuscatus (Linnaeus, 1766) Six subspecies: O. f. fuscatus (Linnaeus, 1766); O. f. nubilosus (Sparrman, 1788); O. f. serratus (Wagler, 1830); O. f. oahuensis (Bloxam, 1826); O. f. crissalis Lawrence, 1872; O. f. luctuosus (Philippi & Landbeck, 1866)	Pantropical seas between about 25° North and South latitude	Size: Habitat: Diet:	LC
Bridled tern	Onychoprion anaethetus (Scopoli, 1786) Four subspecies: O. a. melanopterus (Swainson, 1837); O. a. antarcticus (Lesson, 1831); O. a. anaethetus (Scopoli, 1786); O. a. nelsoni (Ridgway, 1919)	Red Sea, Persian Gulf, Pacific Ocean, western Indian Ocean, Caribbean and West Africa.	Size: Habitat: Diet:	LC
Spectacled tern	Onychoprion lunatus (Peale, 1849) Monotypic	tropical Pacific Ocean	Size: Habitat: Diet:	LC

== Cultural aspects ==
Manutara is the Rapa Nui language name for spectacled and sooty terns. Both arrive at Easter Island and hatch their eggs on the island called Motu Nui, an event that was used for an annual rite called Tangata manu.
