= Middle Island (Lacepede Islands) =

Island in Western Australia

Coordinates: 16°51′S 122°8′E

Middle Island is an island within the Lacepede Islands group, which sits about 30 kilometres (20 mi) off the coast of the Dampier Peninsula in north-west Western Australia. It is located at 16° 51' S 122° 08' E. It forms part of the Lacepede Islands Important Bird Area (IBA), so identified by BirdLife International because of its importance for breeding seabirds.
