= Sandy Island (Lacepede Islands) =

Island in Western Australia

Coordinates: 16°52.86′S 122°10.17′E

Sandy Island is an island within the Lacepede Islands group, which sits about 30 kilometres (20 mi) off the coast of the Dampier Peninsula in north-west Western Australia. It is located at 16° 52.86' S 122° 10.17' E. It forms part of the Lacepede Islands Important Bird Area (IBA), so identified by BirdLife International because of its importance for breeding seabirds.

Sandy Island was originally named Victoria Island by 19th century guano miners and was then described as "little more than a rock of about a mile in circumference".
