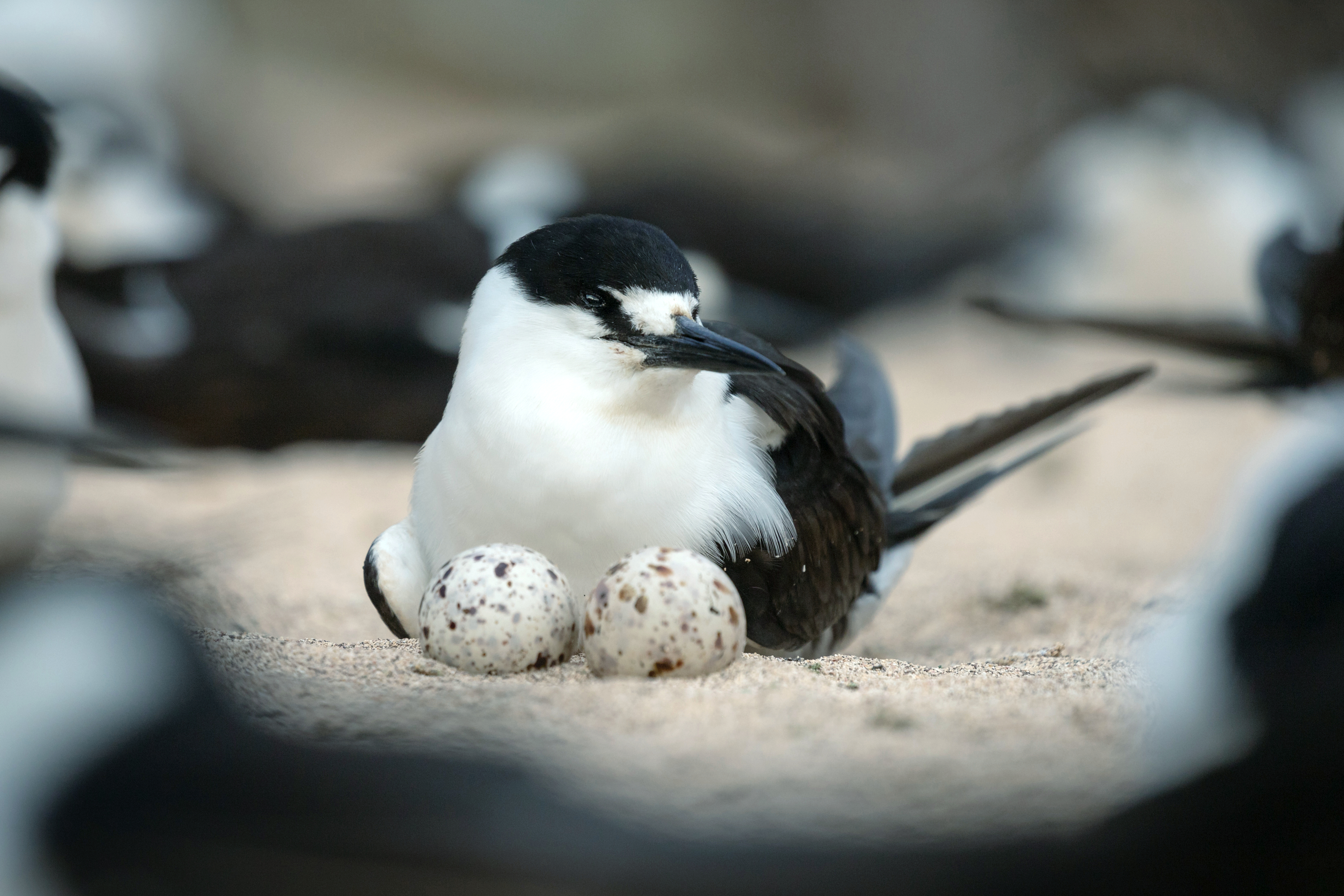
- Onychoprion fuscatus fuscatus on Ilha da Trindade, Brazil

Conservation status
- Least Concern (IUCN 3.1)

Scientific classification
- Kingdom: Animalia
- Phylum: Chordata
- Class: Aves
- Order: Charadriiformes
- Family: Laridae
- Genus: Onychoprion
- Species: O. fuscatus

Binomial name
- Onychoprion fuscatus (Linnaeus, 1766)

Subspecies
- 2–9, see text

Synonyms
- Onychoprion fuscata (orth. err.); Sterna fuscata Linnaeus, 1766; Sterna fuliginosa J. F. Gmelin, 1789; Sterna fuscata nubilosa and see text

= Sooty tern =

Species of bird

The sooty tern (Onychoprion fuscatus) is a tern in the family Laridae. It is a seabird of the tropical oceans and can fly for years at a time, skimming the sea surface for food, and returning to land only to breed, on islands throughout the equatorial zone.

== Taxonomy ==
The sooty tern was described by Carl Linnaeus in 1766 as Sterna fuscata, bearing this name for many years until the genus Sterna was split up; it is now classified in the genus Onychoprion as Onychoprion fuscatus. The genus name is from ancient Greek onux, "claw" or "nail", and prion, "saw". The species name fuscatus is Latin for "dark".

The sooty tern has little interspecific variation, but it is usually divided into six to eight allopatric subspecies. Some recent authors further subdivide the Indopacific population into up to eight subspecies altogether, but much of the variation is clinal. The affinities of eastern Pacific birds (including O. f. manutarus of Easter Island) are most strongly contested. Six subspecies are currently accepted by the IOC:

- Onychoprion fuscatus fuscatus (Linnaeus, 1766) – breeds on tropical Atlantic Ocean, Gulf of Mexico, and Caribbean islands. Underparts white.
- Onychoprion fuscatus nubilosus (Sparrman, 1788) – breeds across the Indian Ocean from the Red Sea to Indonesia, and also the Philippines in the western Pacific Ocean. Underparts light grey in fresh plumage, dull white in worn plumage.
- Onychoprion fuscatus serratus (Wagler, 1830) – breeds on islands off Australia, New Guinea, and New Caledonia.
- Onychoprion fuscatus oahuensis (Bloxam, 1826) – breeds in the north-central tropical Pacific Ocean from the Bonin Islands through Micronesia to southern Polynesia and Hawaii.
- Onychoprion fuscatus crissalis Lawrence, 1872 – breeds in the eastern tropical Pacific Ocean from Guadalupe Island to the Galápagos Islands.
- Onychoprion fuscatus luctuosus (Philippi & Landbeck, 1866) – breeds on the Juan Fernández Islands off Chile in the subtropical southeastern Pacific Ocean.

Two additional subspecies have been suggested by other authors:

- Onychoprion fuscatus infuscatus (Lichtenstein, 1823) – Sunda Islands and vicinity (included in O. f. nubilosus by IOC).
- Onychoprion fuscatus kermadeci Mathews, 1916. – Kermadec Islands (included in O. f. serratus by IOC).
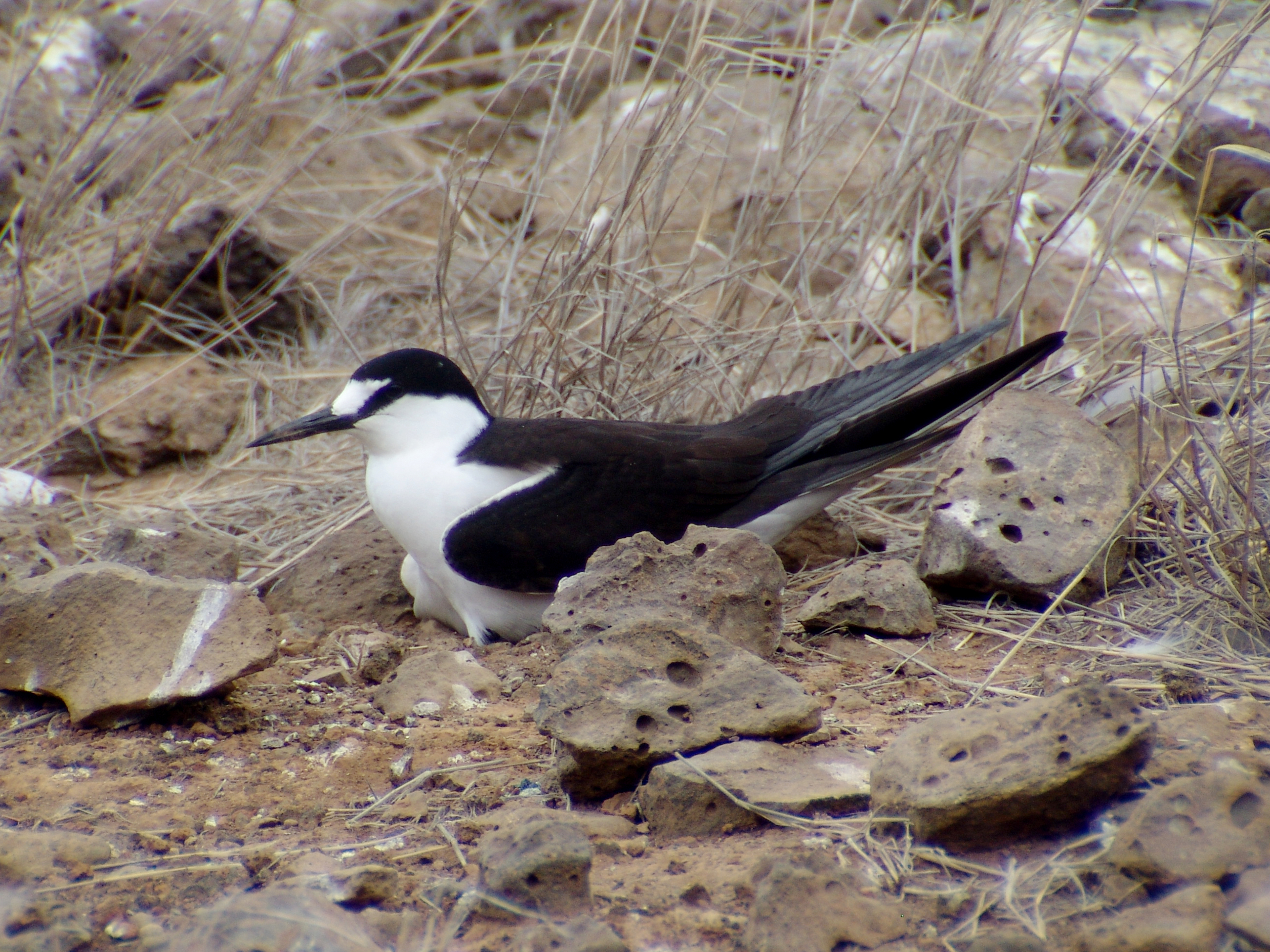
O. f. fuscatus on Ascension Island

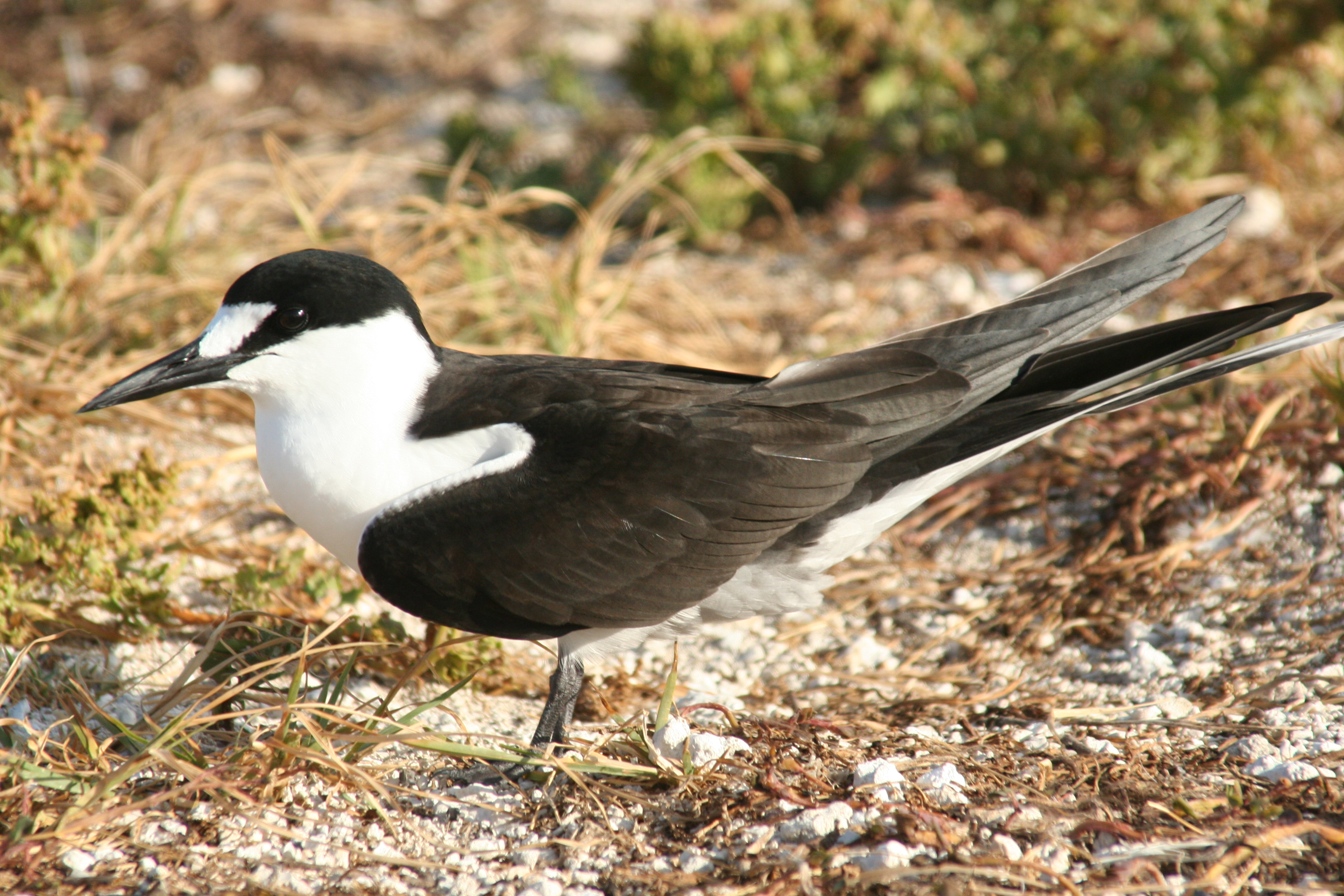
O. f. oahuensis on Tern Island, French Frigate Shoals, Hawaii

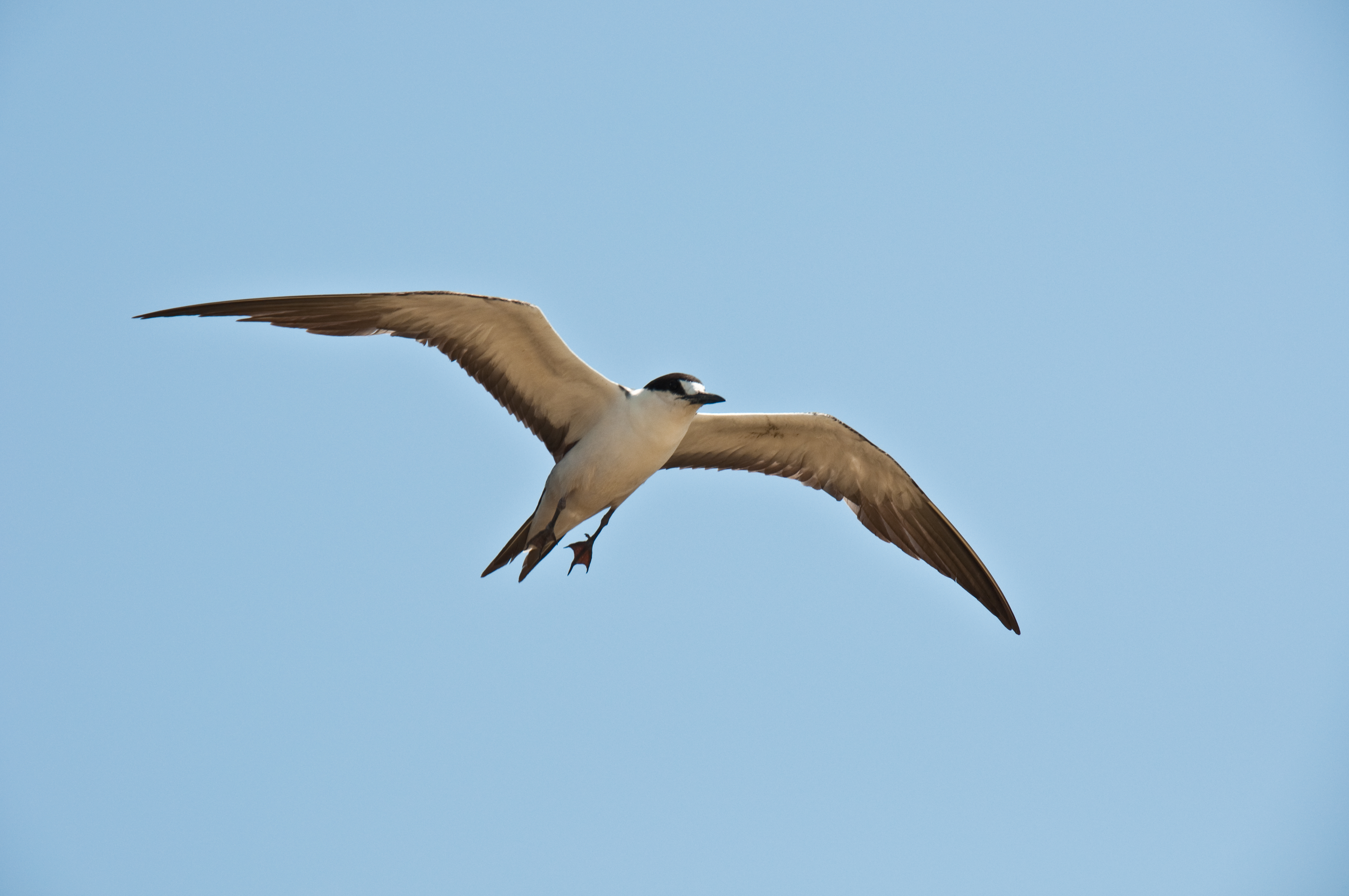
O. f. nubilosus, Rodrigues Island in the Indian Ocean

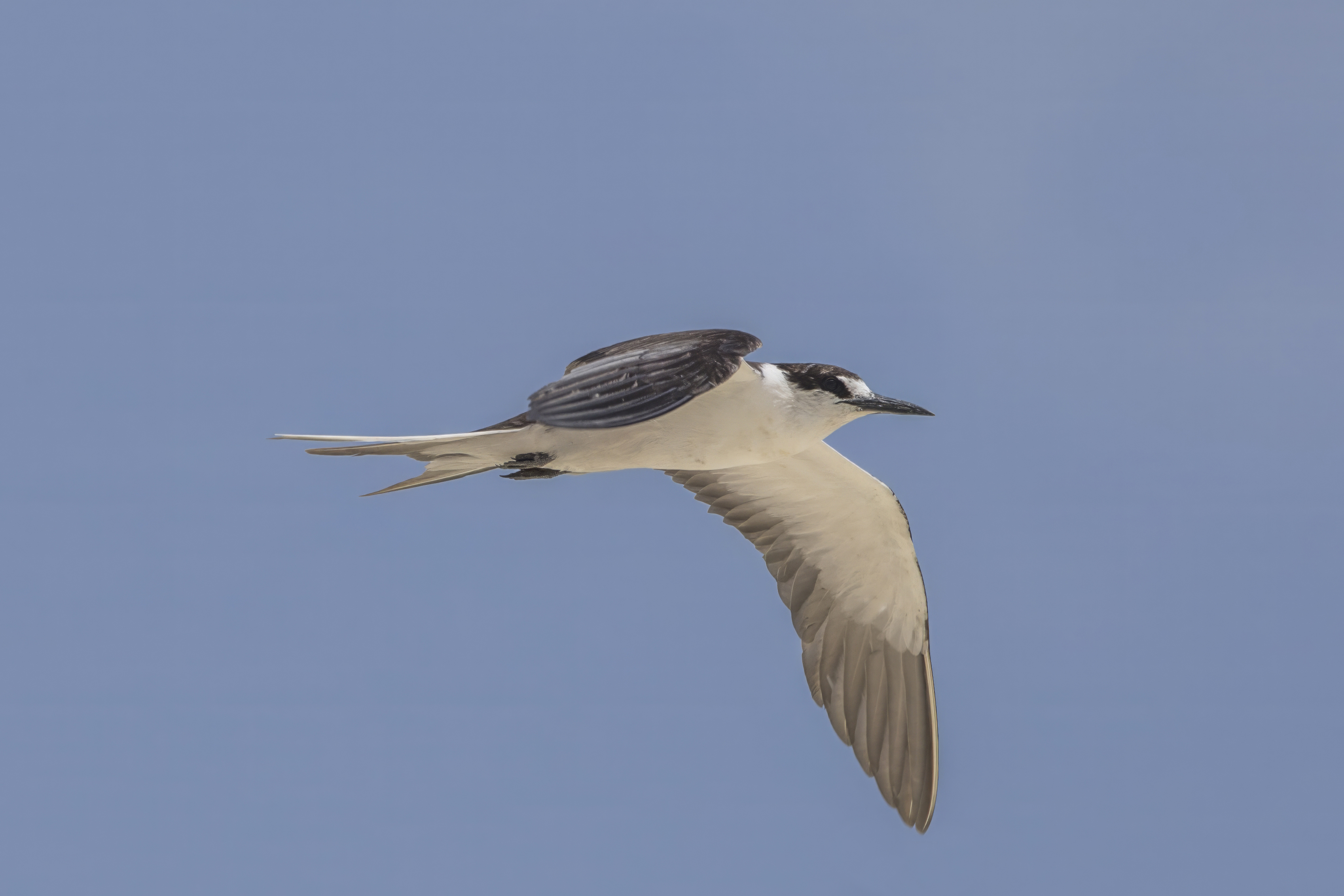
O. f. serratus, Michaelmas Cay, Queensland

== Description ==
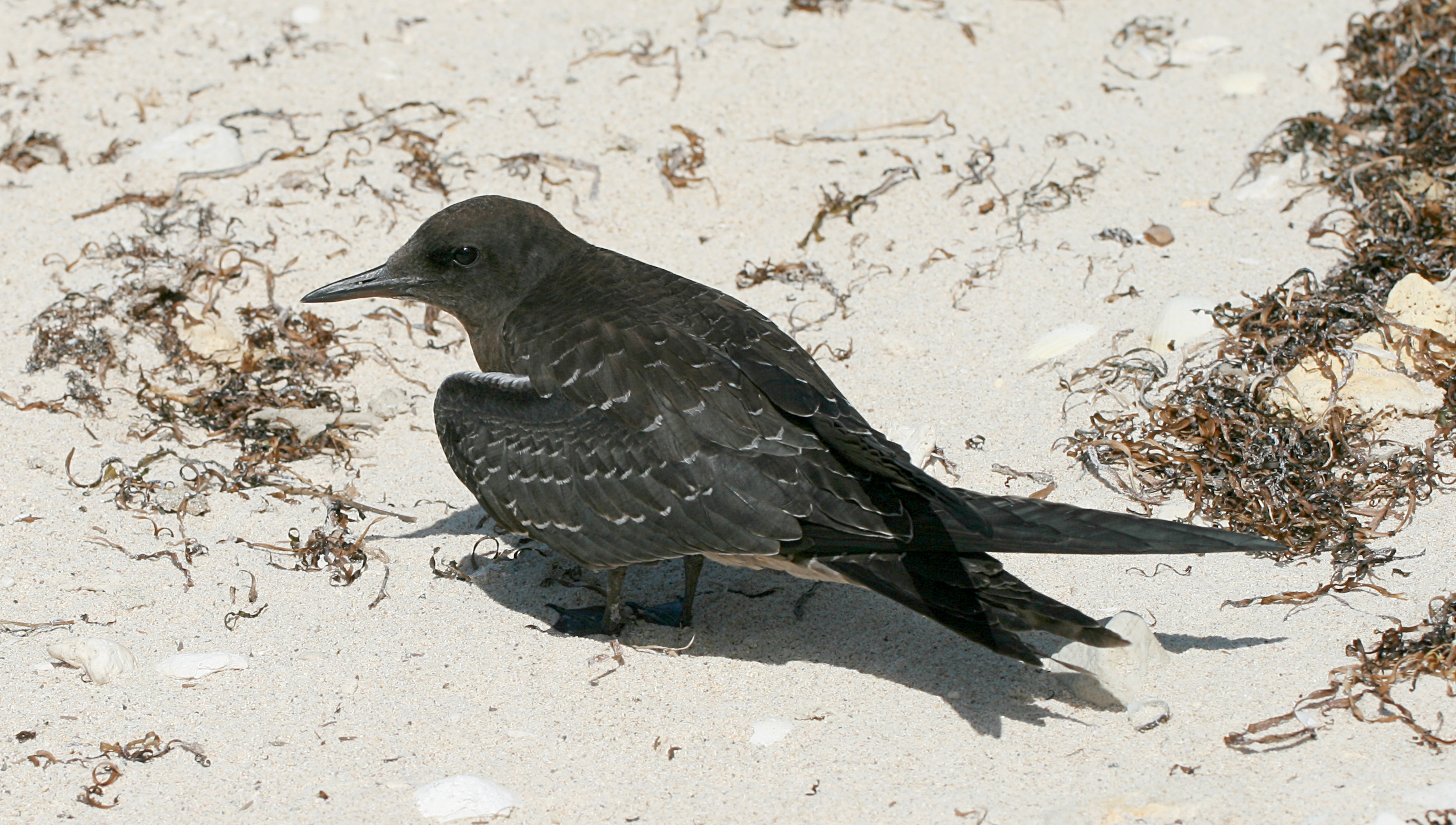
Juvenile on Lord Howe Island; note the scaly appearance

It is a medium-large tern, similar in size to the Sandwich tern (Thalasseus sandvicensis) at 36–45 cm (14–17.5 in) long with an 82–94 cm (32.5–37 in) wingspan. The wings and tail are long, and it has black to dark blackish-brown upperparts and white underparts, and a white forehead. The tail is moderately deeply forked (more deeply forked than in Thalasseus terns, but less deeply than most Sterna terns), black, with white outer edges. It has black legs and bill. The average life span is 32 years. Juvenile sooty terns are grey-black above and below with narrow pale fringes on the upperpart feathers giving a scaly appearance above, and whitish on only the lower belly.

The sooty tern is unlikely to be confused with any tern apart from the similarly dark-backed but smaller bridled tern (O. anaethetus). It is darker-backed than that species, and has a broader white forehead and no pale neck collar.

The call is a loud piercing 'wide-a-wake', also cited as ker-wack-a-wack; it also has a harsh alarm call kvaark.

== Ecology ==
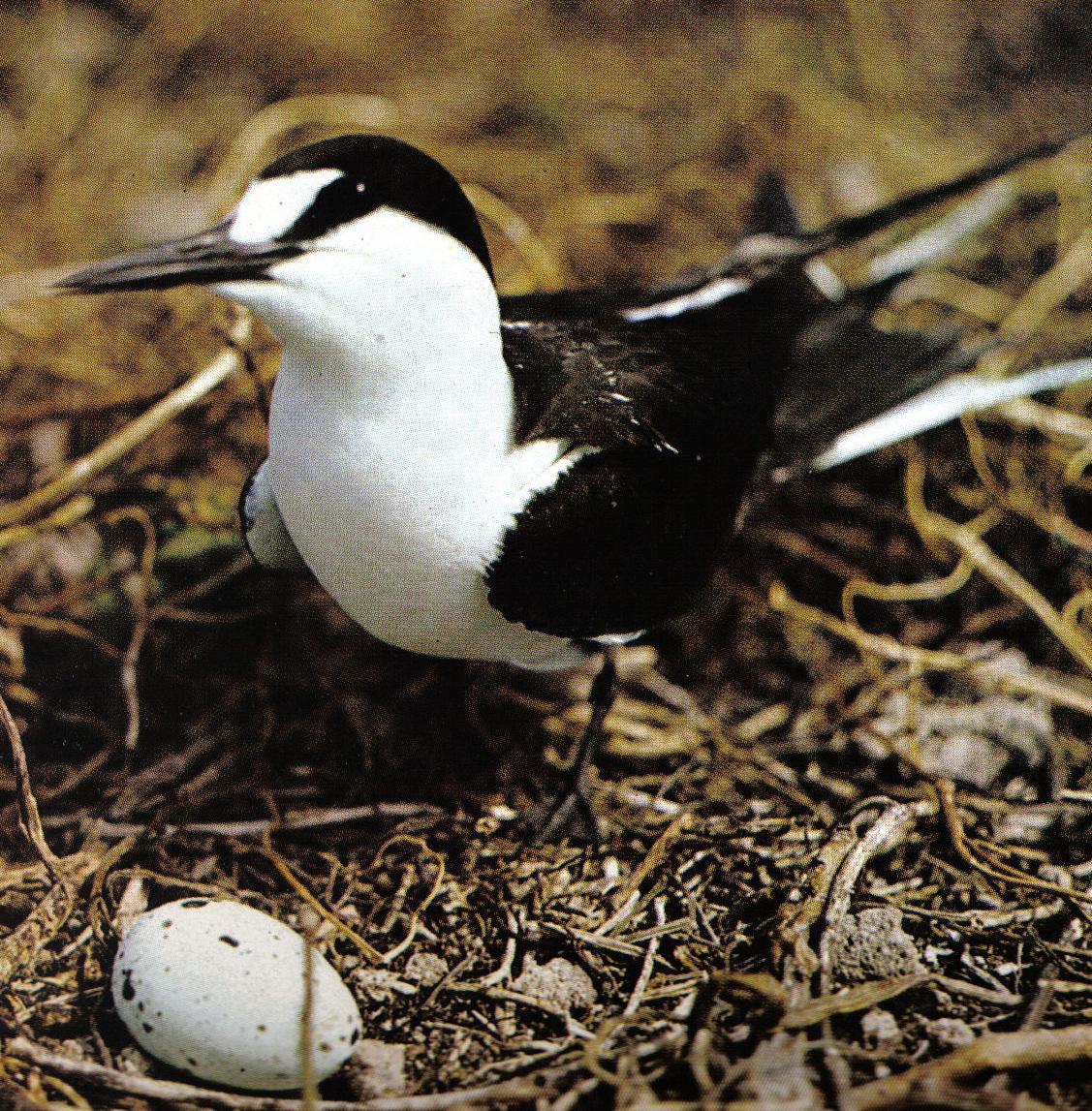
Adult O. f. nubilosus with egg in nest, Seychelles

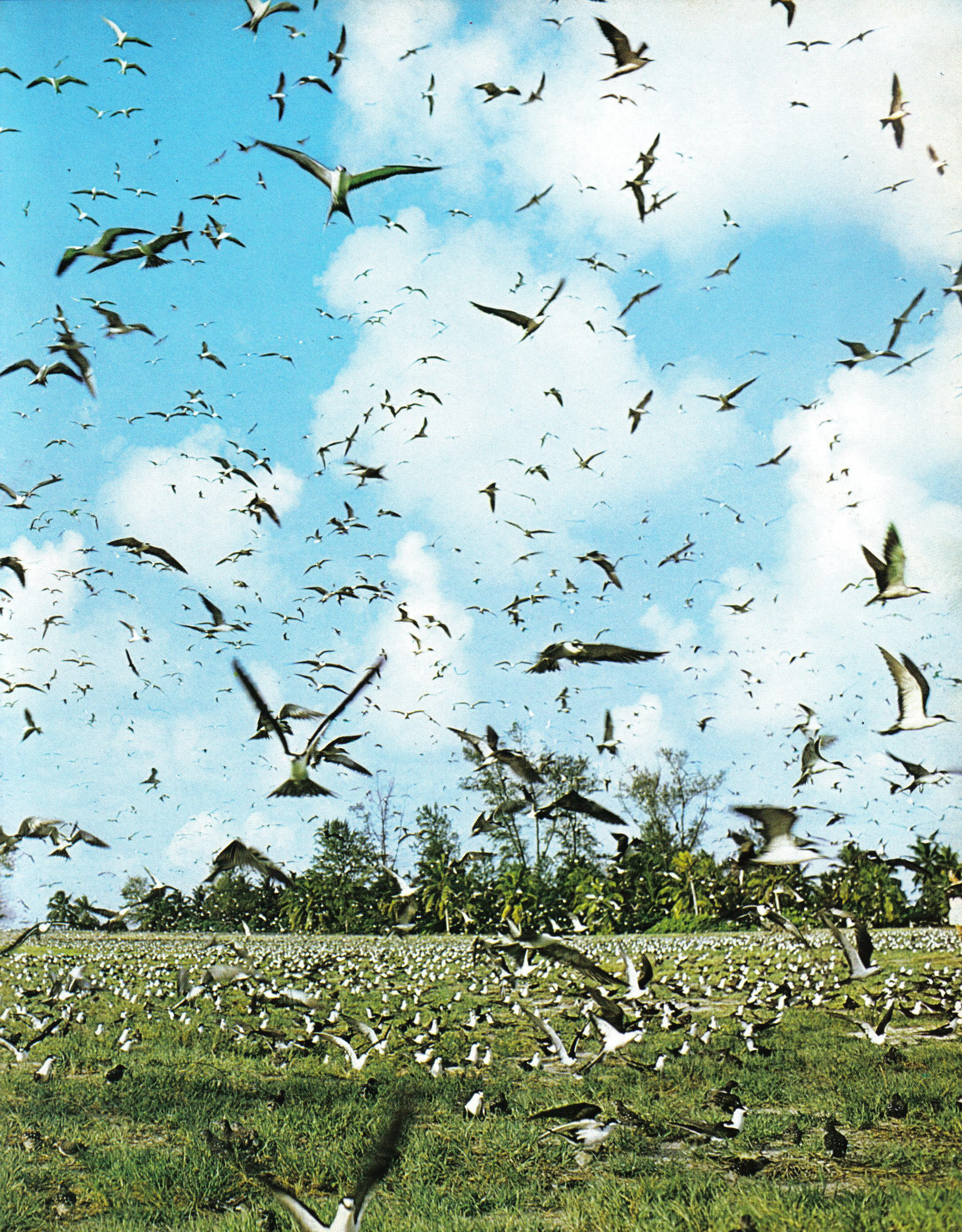
O. f. nubilosus at Bird Island, Seychelles, home to more than a million sooty terns at its peak

Sooty terns breed in colonies on rocky or coral islands. It nests in a ground scrape or hole and lays a single egg, typically in the afternoon. Although "two-egg clutches" have been reported, they probably occur when an egg from one nest rolls into another. It feeds by picking fish from the surface in marine environments, often in large flocks, and rarely comes to land except to breed, and can stay out to sea for 3 to 10 years. Due to the lack of oil in its feathers, it cannot float, and spends that entire time on the wing.

This bird is migratory and dispersive, wintering more widely through the tropical oceans. It has very marine habits compared to most terns; sooty terns are generally found inland only after severe storms. The Field Museum, for example, has a male specimen which was found exhausted on August 2, 1933 on the slopes of Mount Cameroon above Buea, about 1,000 m (3,300 ft) ASL, after foul weather had hit the Gulf of Guinea. This species is a rare vagrant to western Europe, although a bird was present at Cemlyn Bay, Wales for 11 days in July 2005.

It is also not normally found on the Pacific coasts of the Americas due to its pelagic habits. At Baja California, where several nesting locations are offshore, it can be seen more frequently, whereas for example only two individuals have ever been recorded on the coast of El Salvador - one ring recovered in 1972, and a bird photographed on October 10, 2001 at Lake Olomega which was probably blown there by a storm. Hurricanes can also devastate small breeding colonies, as has been surmised for example for the sooty tern nesting sites on cays off the San Andrés Islands of Colombia.

An exceptionally common bird, the sooty tern is not considered threatened by the IUCN.

== In culture ==
Colloquially, it is sometimes known as "wideawake" or "wideawake tern"; an onomatopoeic name derived from its call 'wide-a-wake', as is the Hawaiian name ʻewa ʻewa which roughly means "cacophony". In most of Polynesia its name is manutara or similar, literally "tern-bird", though it might be better rendered in English as "the tern" or "common tern". This refers to the fact that wherever Polynesian seafarers went on their long voyages, they usually would find these birds in astounding numbers. It is also known as kaveka in the Marquesas Islands, where dishes using its eggs are a delicacy.

On Easter Island, this species and the spectacled tern (O. lunatus) are collectively known as manutara. The manutara played an important role in the tangata manu ("birdman") ritual: whichever hopu (champion) could retrieve the first manutara egg from Motu Nui islet would become that year's tangata manu; his clan would receive prime access to resources, especially seabird eggs.

== Gallery ==
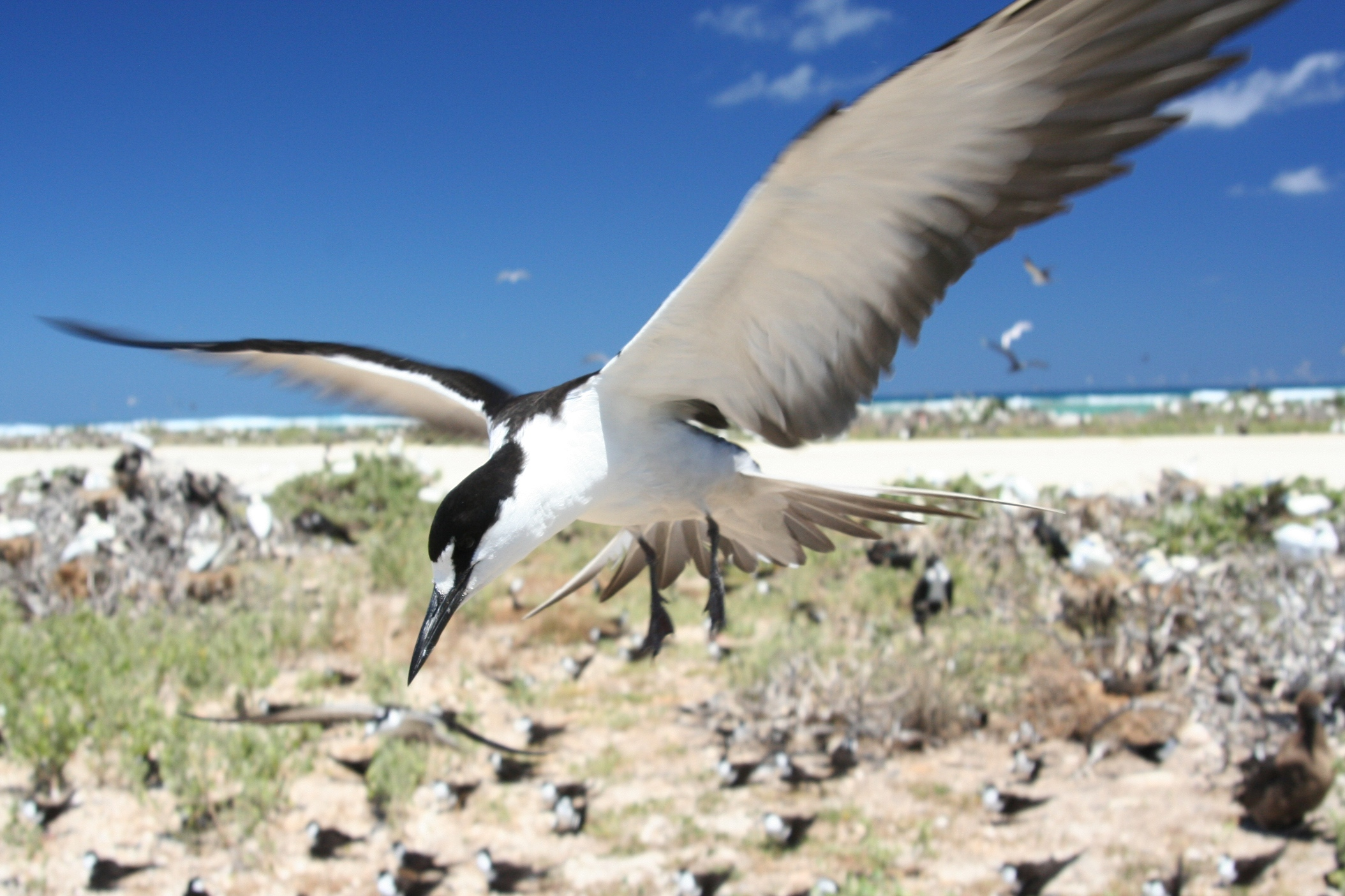
Sooty tern colony on Tern Island (French Frigate Shoals)

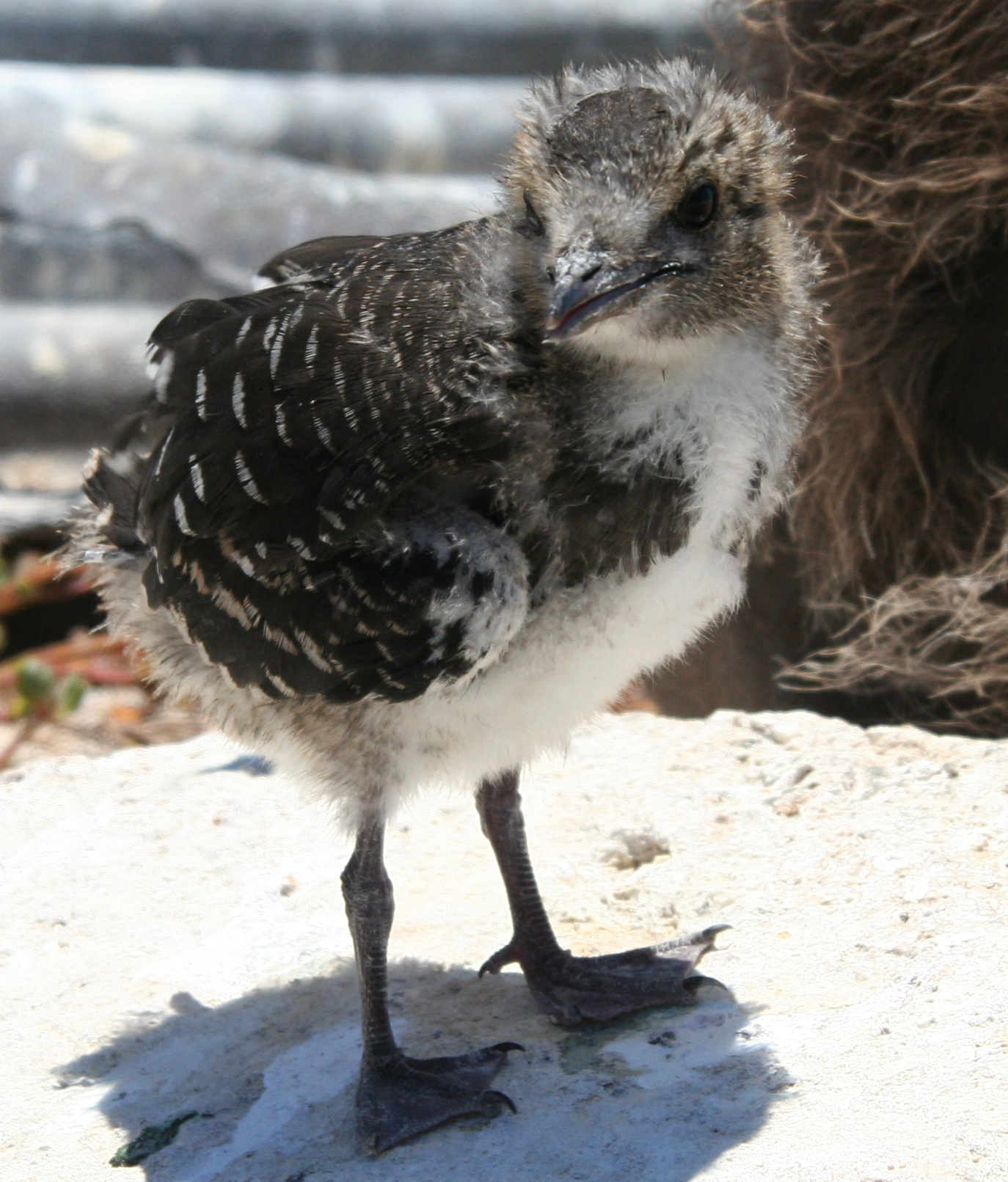
Chick on Tern Island, French Frigate Shoals

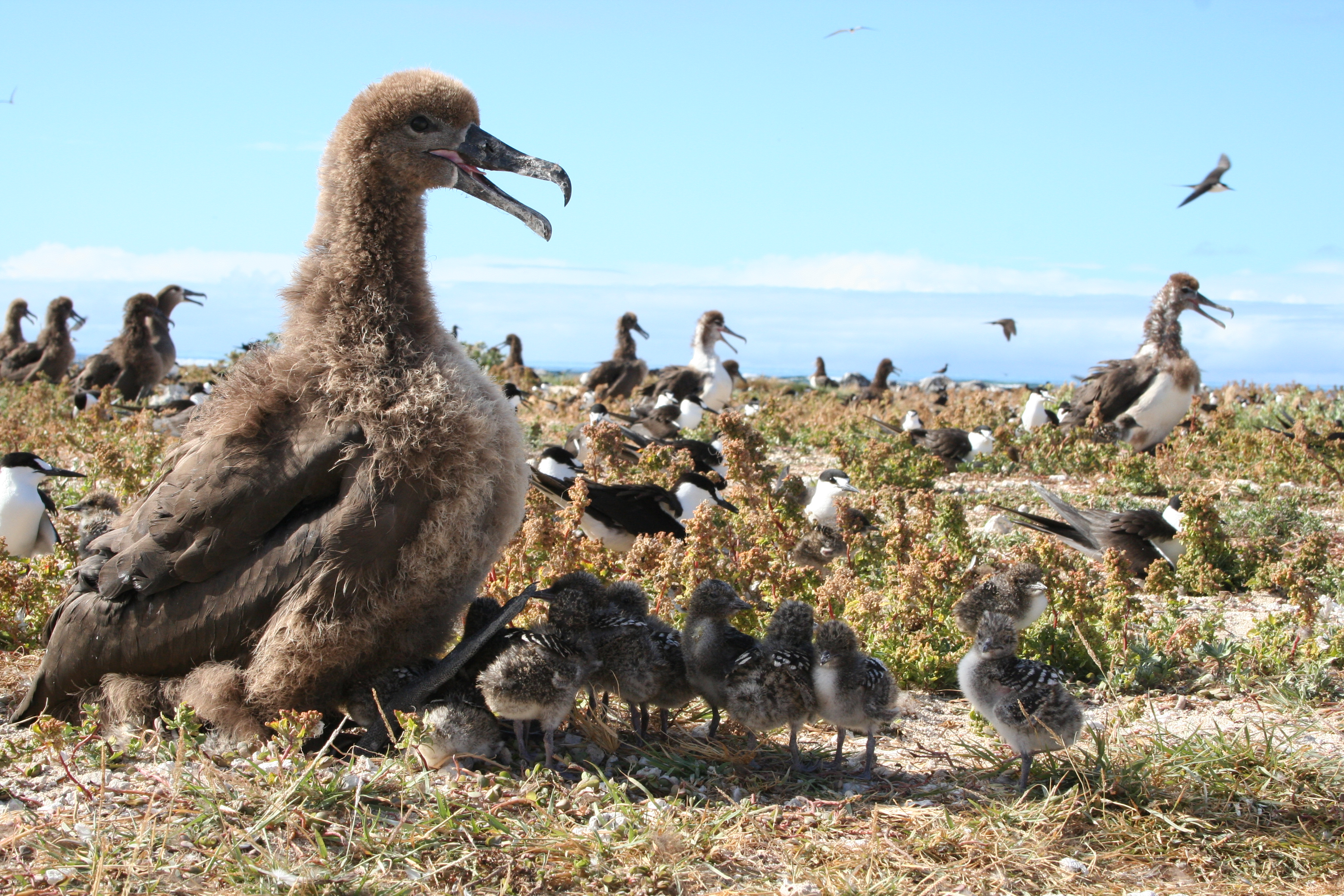
Sooty tern chicks seeking shade under the shadow of a young black-footed albatross

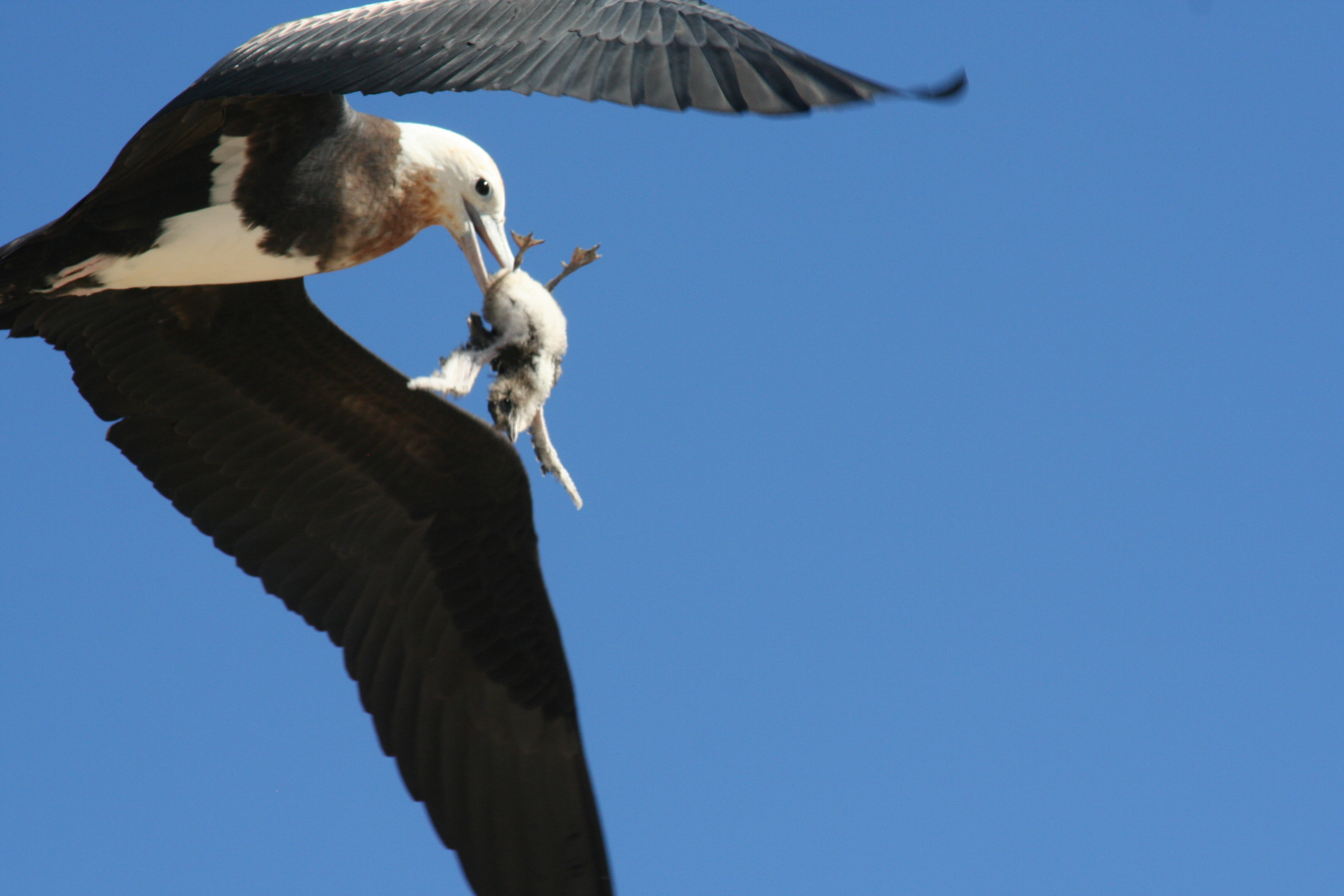
A chick is snatched by a predatory great frigatebird

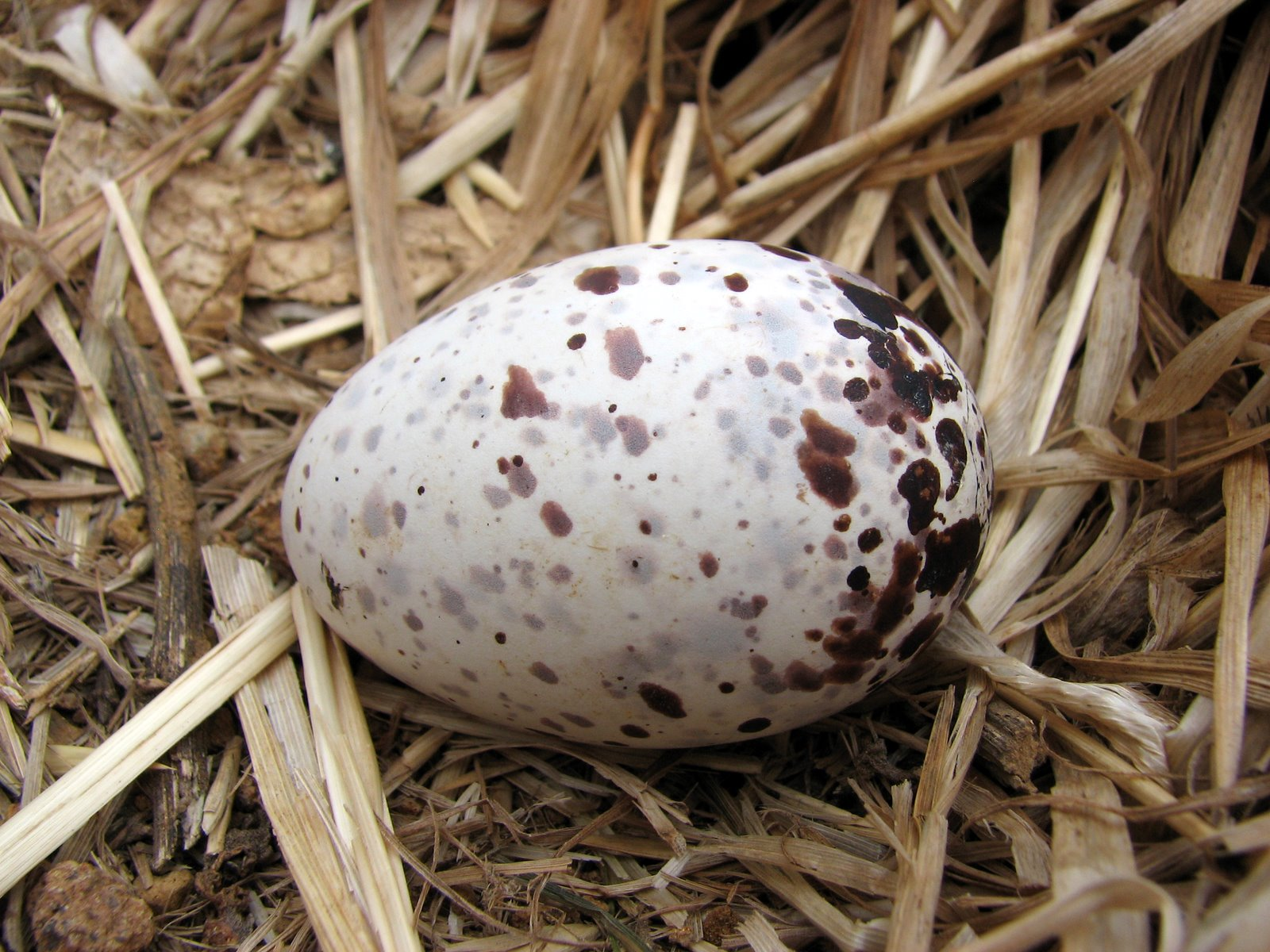
Egg
