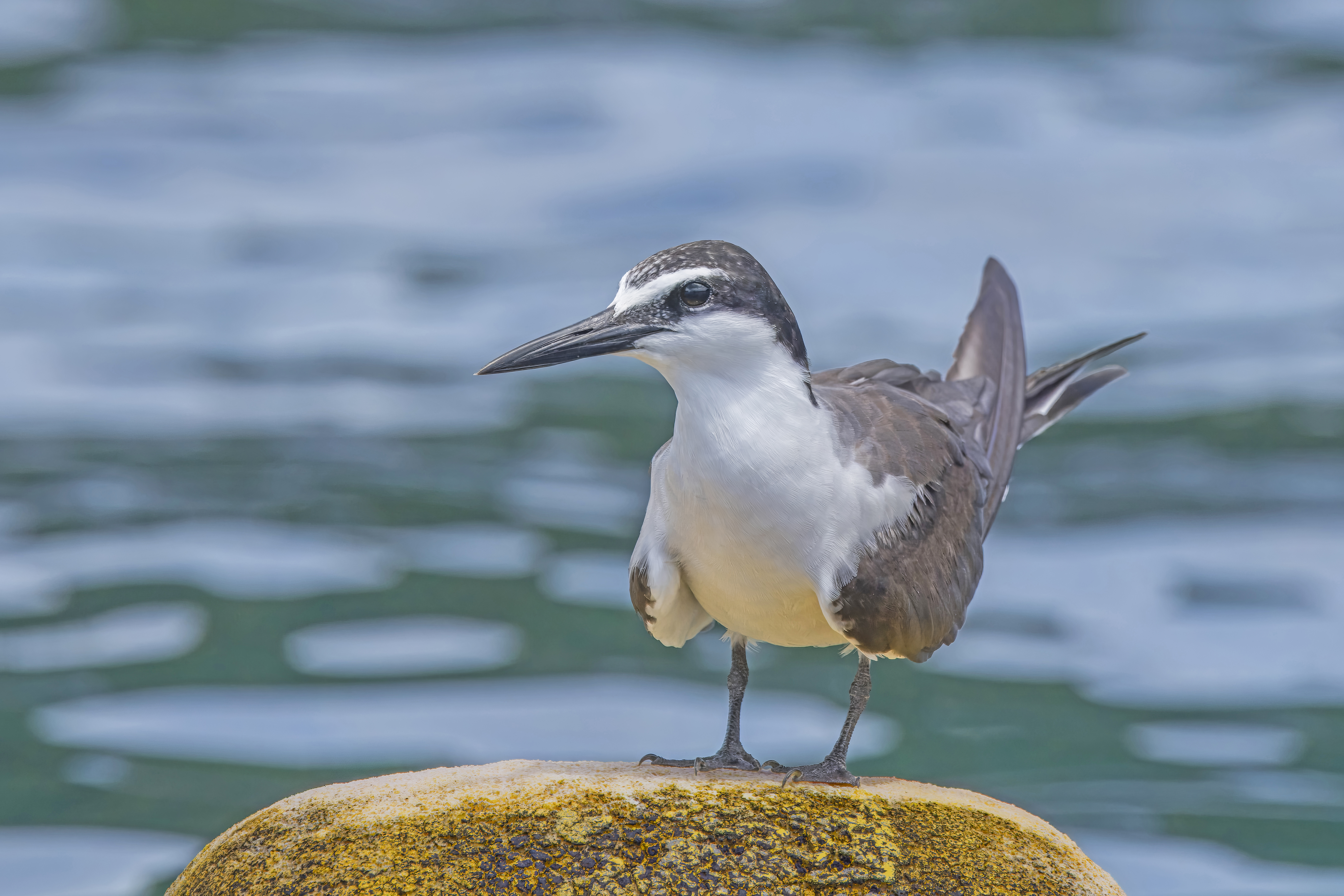
- In breeding plumage Rock Islands, Palau

Conservation status
- Least Concern (IUCN 3.1)

Scientific classification
- Kingdom: Animalia
- Phylum: Chordata
- Class: Aves
- Order: Charadriiformes
- Family: Laridae
- Genus: Onychoprion
- Species: O. anaethetus

Binomial name
- Onychoprion anaethetus (Scopoli, 1786)

Synonyms
- Sterna anaetheta Scopoli, 1786 Sterna anaethetus Scopoli, 1786

= Bridled tern =

Species of bird

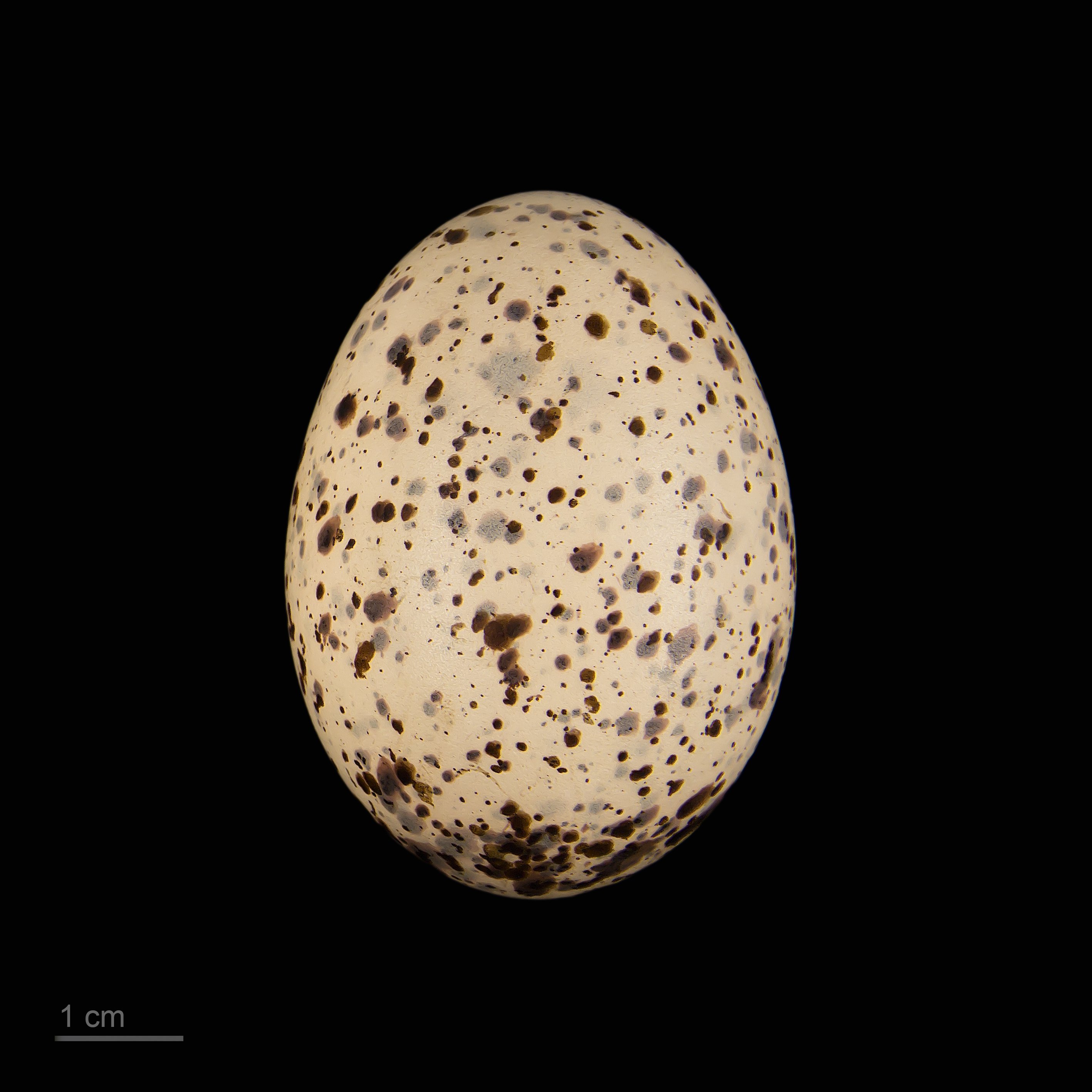
Onychoprion anaethetus - MHNT

The bridled tern (Onychoprion anaethetus) is a seabird of the family Laridae. It is a bird of the tropical oceans. The scientific name is from Ancient Greek. The genus comes from onux meaning "claw" or "nail", and prion, meaning "saw". The specific anaethetus means "senseless, stupid", in reference to its tameness around humans.

== Description ==
This is a medium-sized tern, at 30–32 cm in length and with a 77–81 cm wingspan similar to the common tern in size, but more heavily built. The wings and deeply forked tail are long, and it has dark grey upperparts and white underparts. The forehead and eyebrows are white, as is a striking collar on the hindneck. It has black legs and bill. Juvenile bridled terns are scaly grey above and pale below.

This species is unlikely to be confused with any tern apart from the similarly dark-backed sooty tern and the spectacled tern from the Tropical Pacific. It is paler-backed than that sooty, (but not as pale as the grey-backed) and has a narrower white forehead and a pale neck collar.

== Distribution and movements ==
This bird is migratory and dispersive, wintering more widely through the tropical oceans. It has markedly marine habits compared to most terns. The Atlantic subspecies melanopterus breeds in Mexico, the Caribbean and west Africa; other races occur around the Arabian Peninsula and in Southeast Asia and Australasia, but the exact number of valid subspecies is disputed. It is a rare vagrant to western Europe. These are the four subspecies listed by the IOC:

- O. a. melanopterus – (Swainson, 1837): Caribbean and West Africa.
- O. a. antarcticus – (Lesson, 1831): Red Sea, Persian Gulf and western Indian Ocean.
- O. a. anaethetus – (Scopoli, 1786): eastern Indian, and Pacific Oceans.
- O. a. nelsoni – (Ridgway, 1919): west coast of Mexico and Central America.

== Breeding ==
This species breeds in colonies on rocky islands. It nests in a ground scrape or hole and lays one egg. It feeds by plunge-diving for fish in marine environments, but will also pick from the surface like the black tern and the gull-billed tern. It usually dives directly, and not from the "stepped-hover" favoured by the Arctic tern. The offering of fish by the male to the female is part of the courtship display.

Lady Elliot Island, Qld, Australia

== Various views and plumages ==
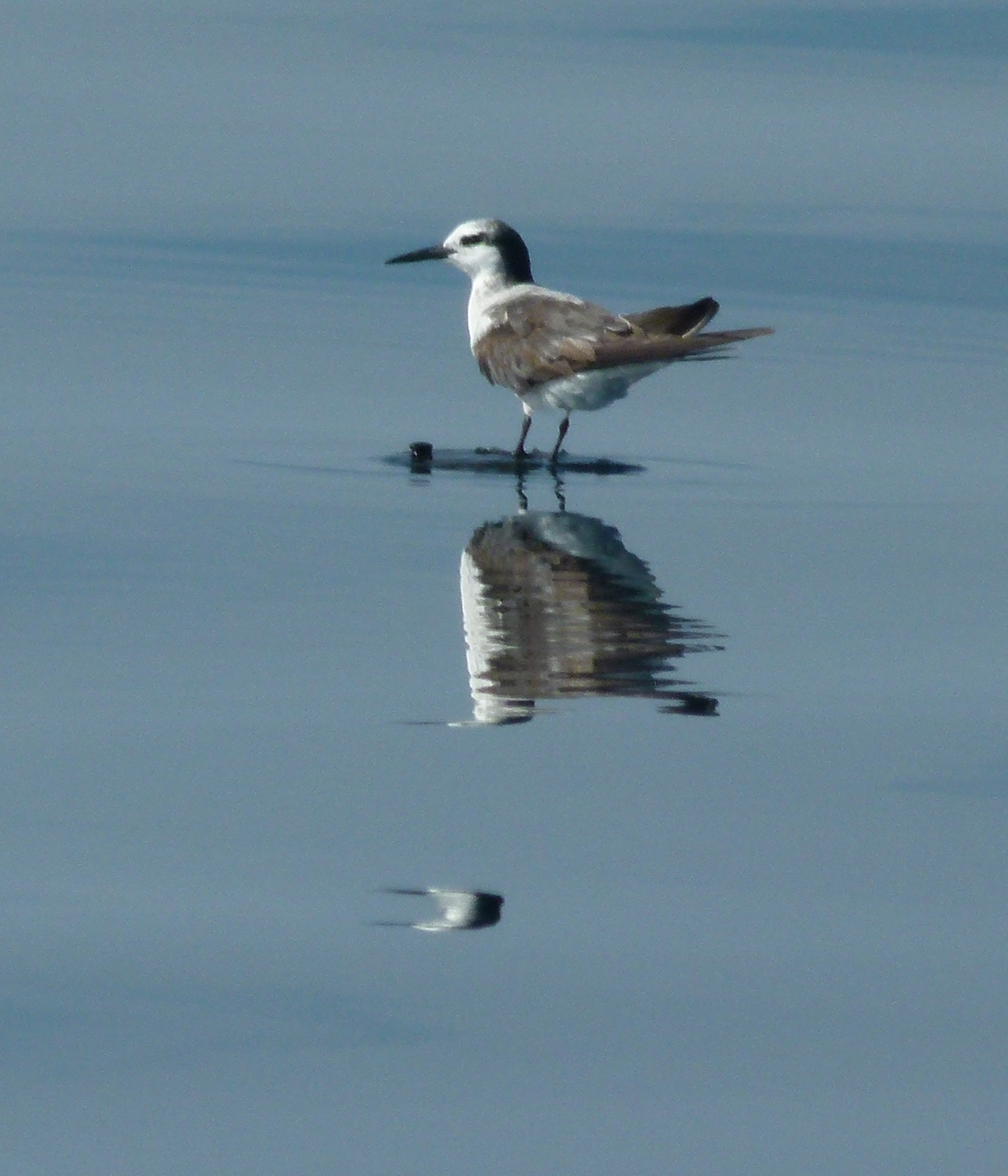
In non-breeding plumage

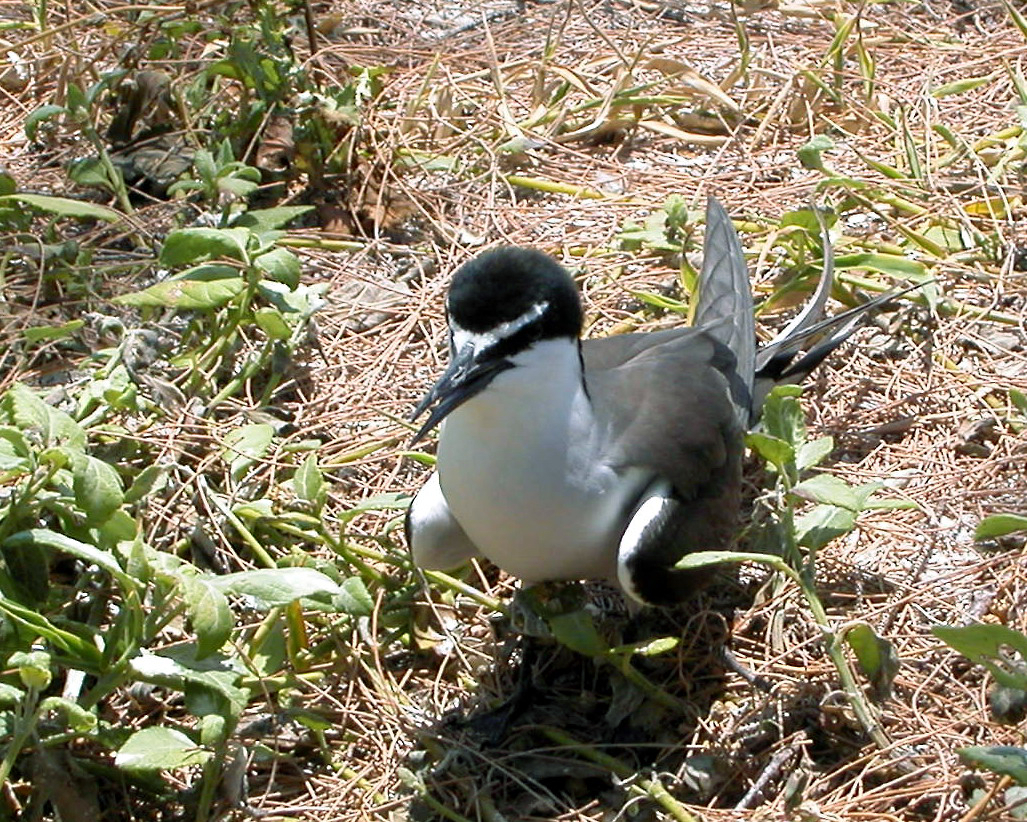
Bridled tern, at rookery

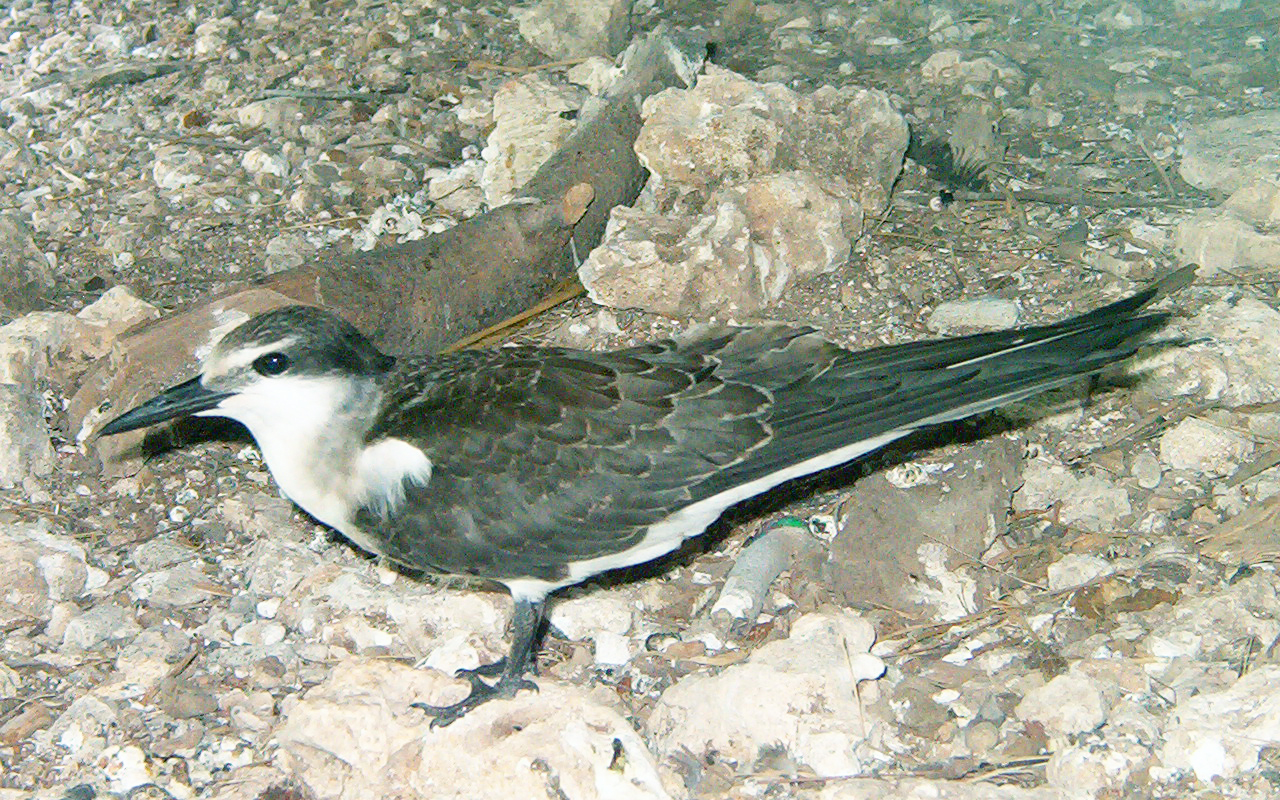
Juvenile on Lady Elliot Island, Queensland, Australia

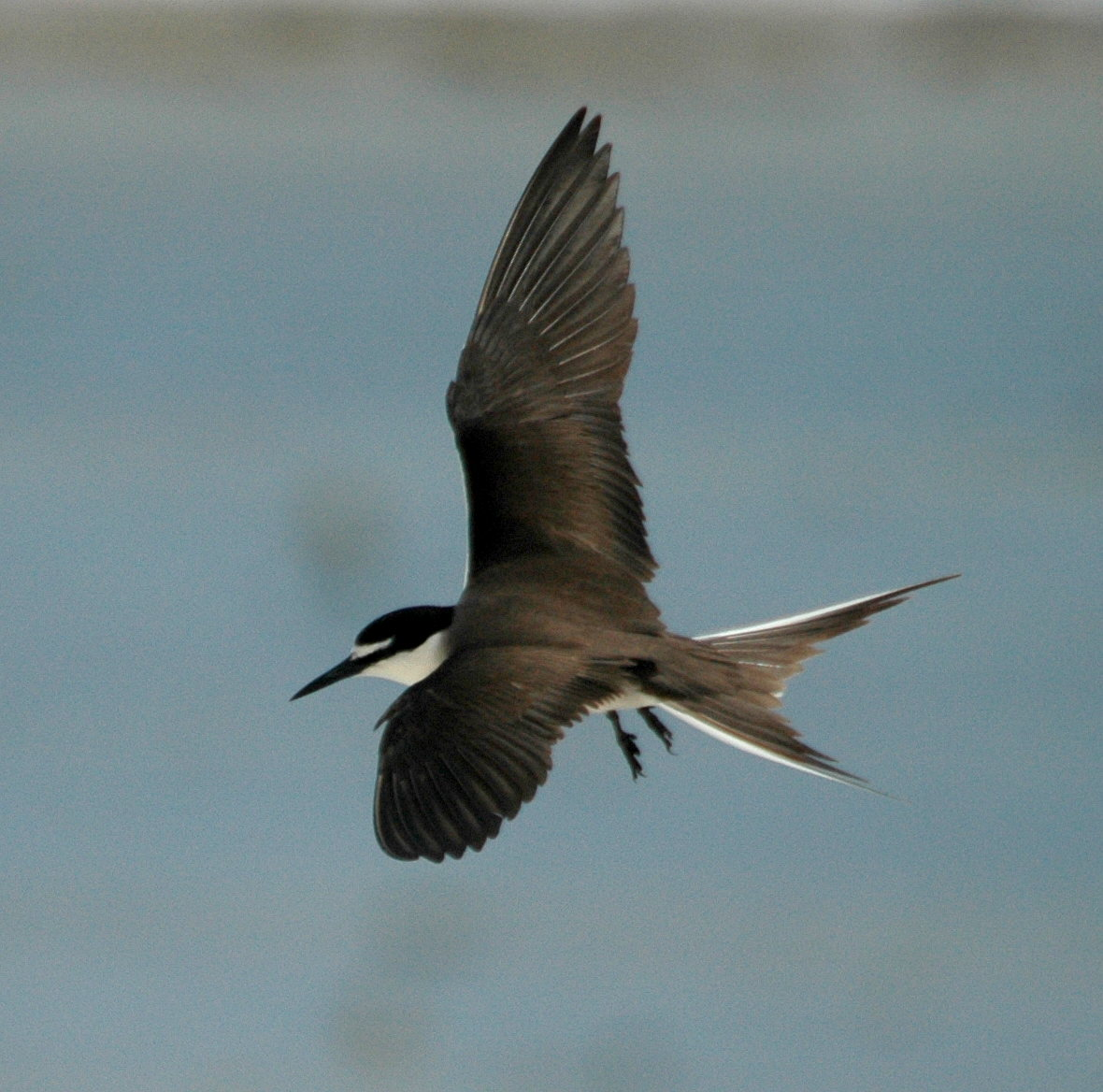
In flight Lady Elliot Island, Queensland, Australia

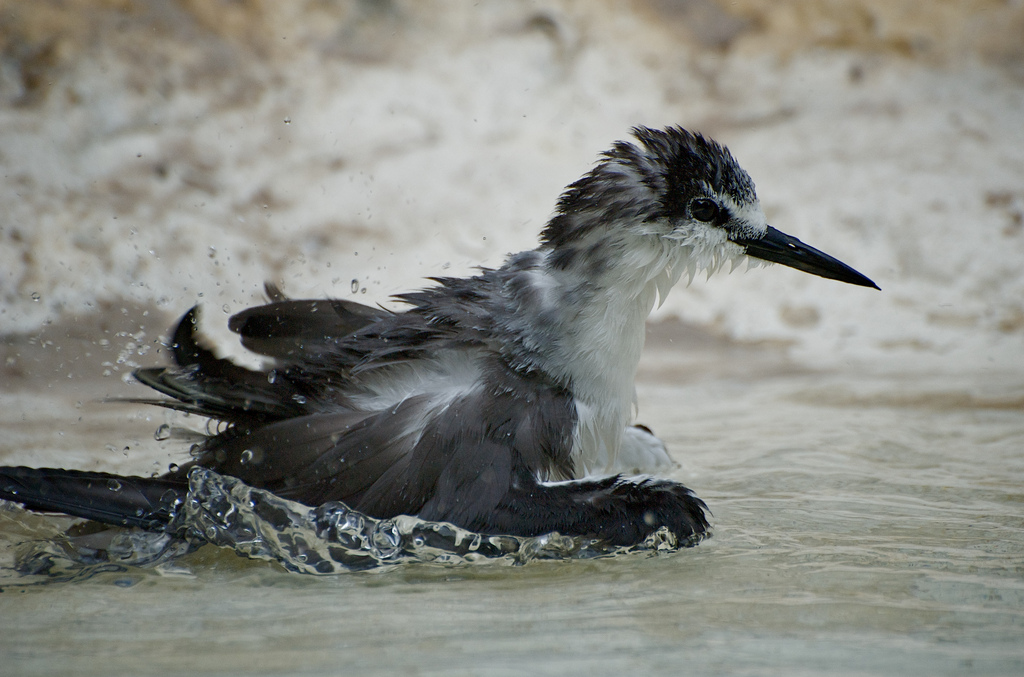
Juvenile bathing at Perth Zoo

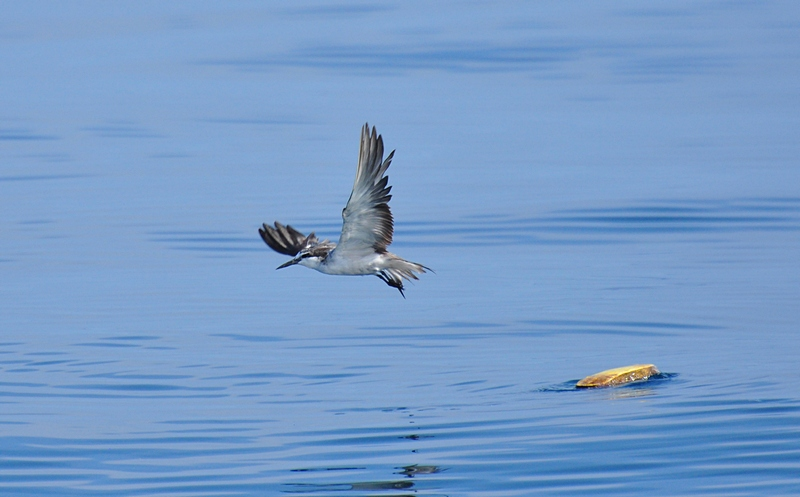
Juvenile or adult with non-breeding plumage taking off from a sea debris perch during Pelagic expedition off coast of Malpe

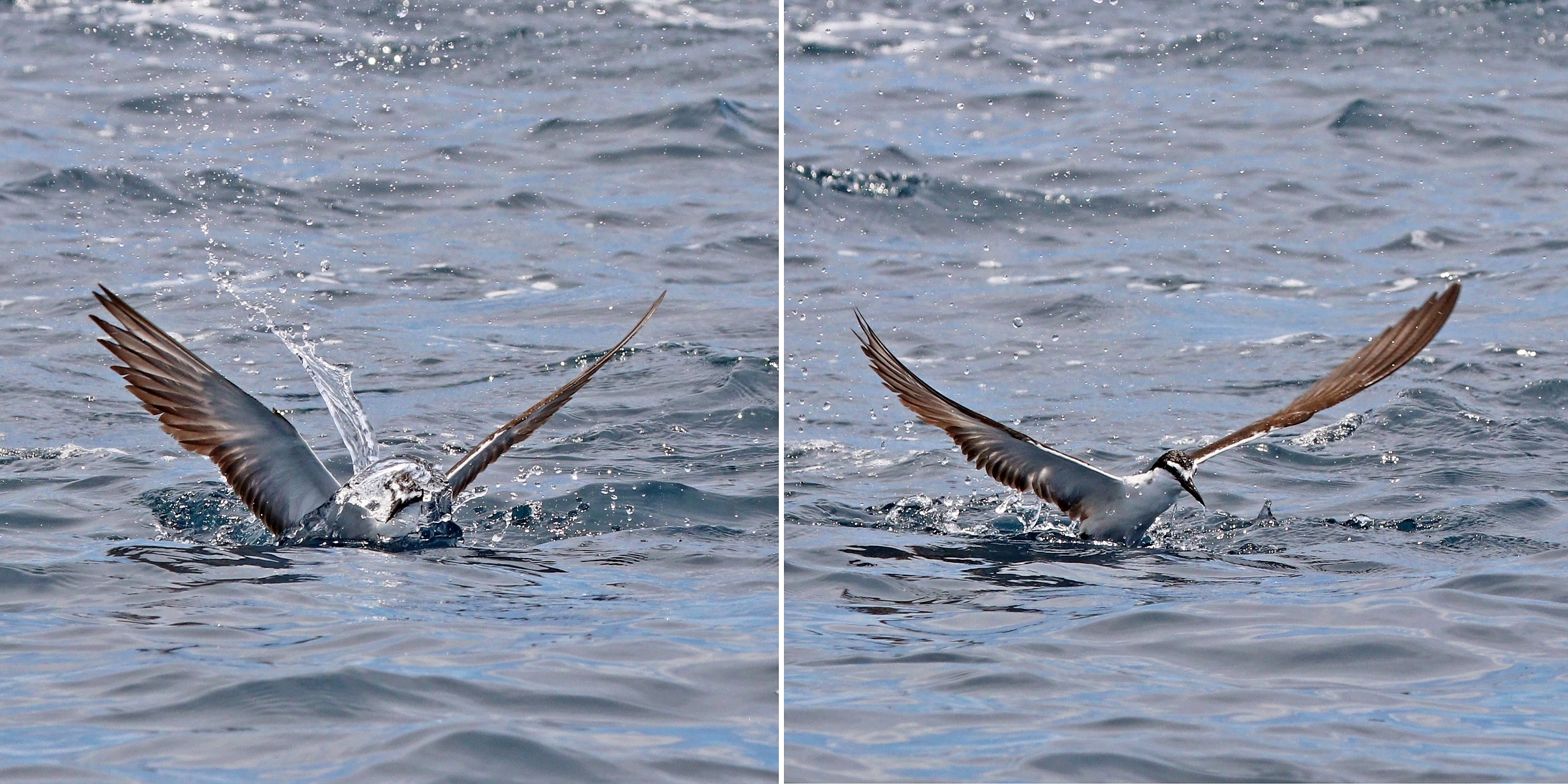
O. a. antarcticus after dive (composite)

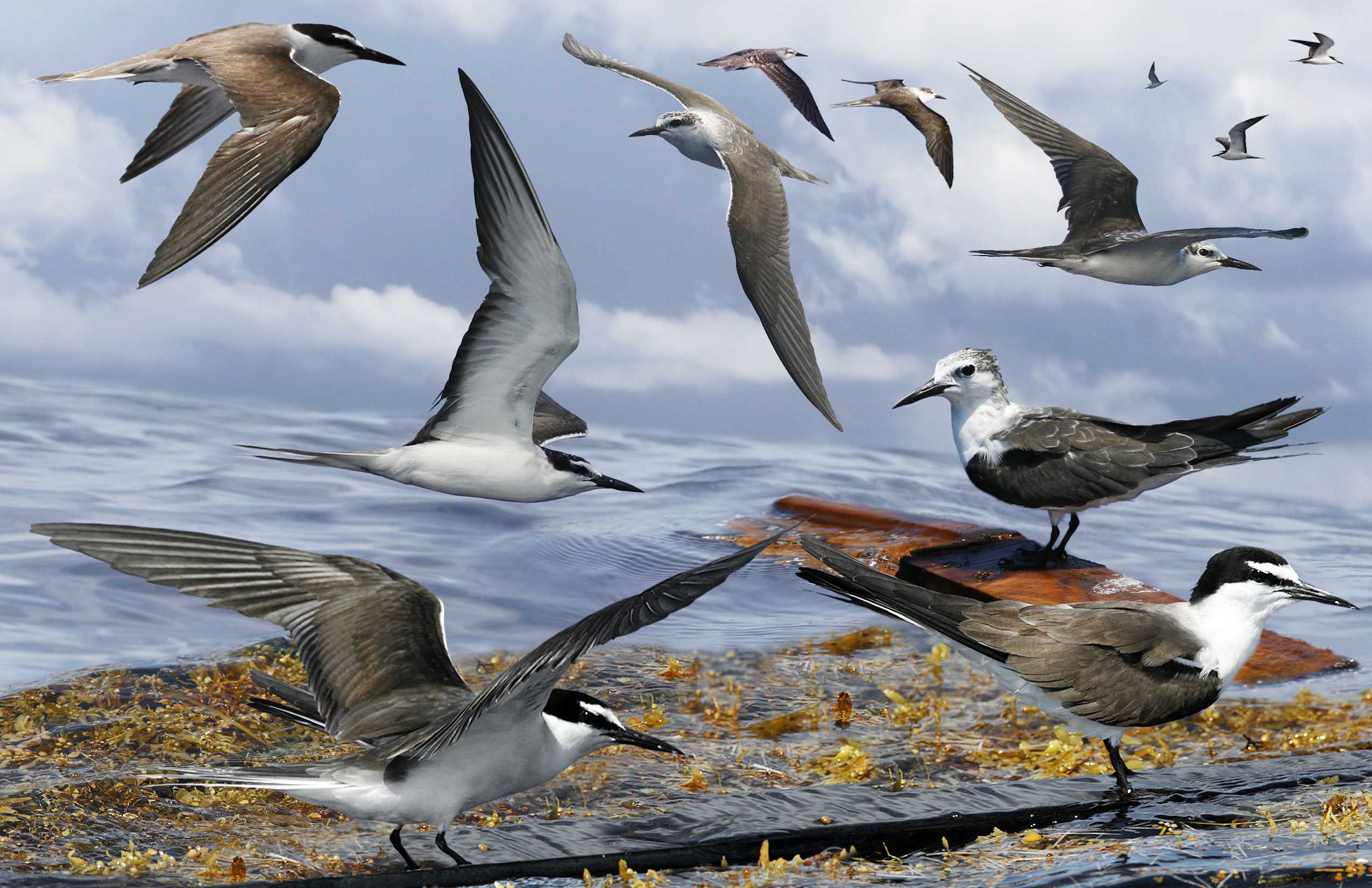
ID composite

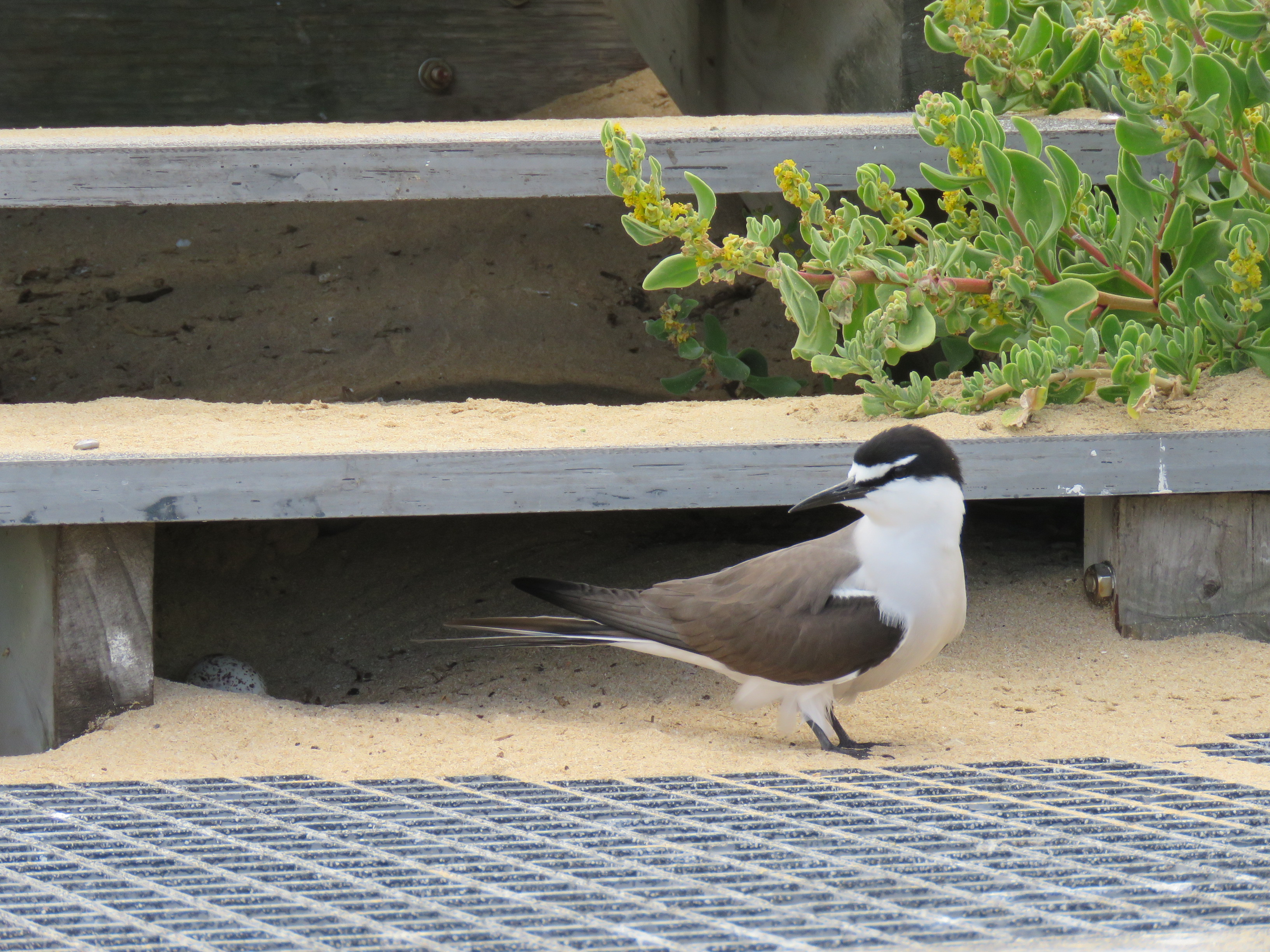
With egg in nest under boardwalk steps on Penguin Island, Western Australia
