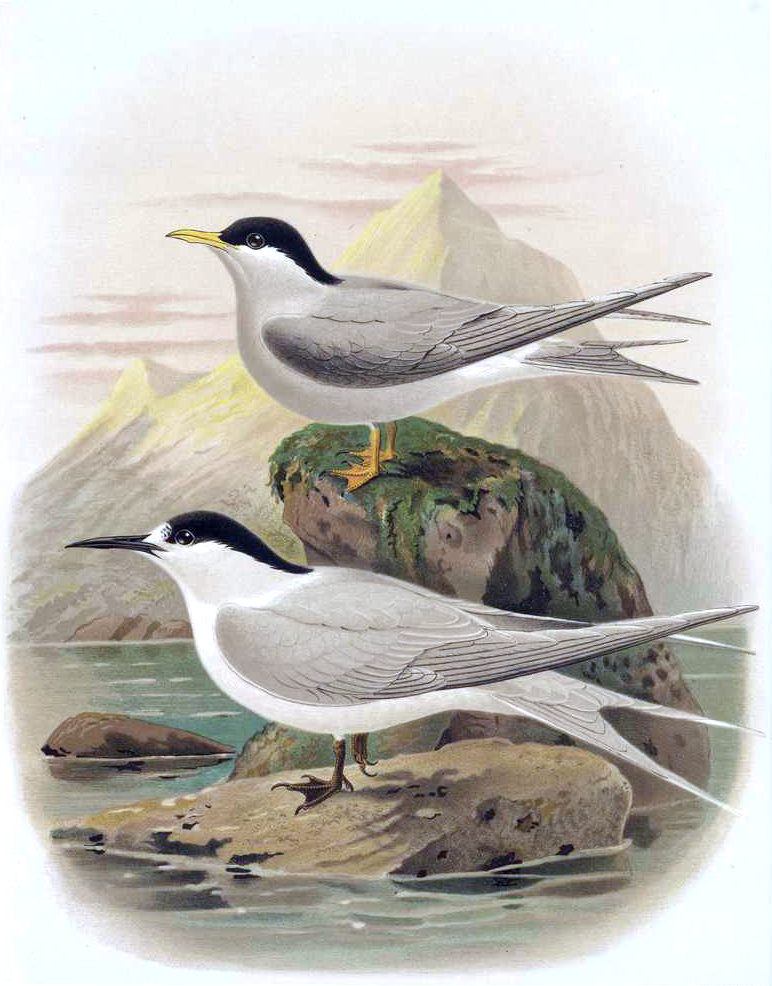
- Black-fronted tern (above); Chlidonias albostriatus

Scientific classification
- Kingdom: Animalia
- Phylum: Chordata
- Class: Aves
- Order: Charadriiformes
- Family: Laridae
- Genus: Chlidonias; Rafinesque, 1822

Type species
- Sterna melanops Rafinesque, 1822

Species
- Chlidonias niger; Chlidonias leucopterus; Chlidonias hybrida; Chlidonias albostriatus

= Marsh tern =

Marsh terns

Genus of birds

The name marsh tern refers to terns of the genus Chlidonias, which typically breed in freshwater marshes, rather than coastal locations.

== Taxonomy ==
The genus Chlidonias was introduced in 1822 by the French polymath Constantine Samuel Rafinesque with Sterna melanops Rafinesque = Sterna surinamensis Gmelin, J.F. as the type species. The name Chlidonias is from Ancient Greek khelidonios, "swallow-like", from khelidon, "swallow".

== Species ==
The genus contains four species:

Genus Chlidonias – Rafinesque, 1822 – four species
Common name	Scientific name and subspecies	Range	Size and ecology	IUCN status and estimated population
Black tern	Chlidonias niger (Linnaeus, 1758) Two subspecies: C. n. niger (Linnaeus, 1758); C. n. surinamensis (Gmelin, JF, 1789)	Europe, Western Asia and North America.	Size: Habitat: Diet:	LC
White-winged tern or white-winged black tern	Chlidonias leucopterus (Temminck, 1815)	Europe, Africa, Asia, and Australia.	Size: Habitat: Diet:	LC
Whiskered tern	Chlidonias hybrida (Pallas, 1811) Three subspecies: C. h. hybrida – (Pallas, 1811); C. h. delalandii – (Mathews, 1912); C. h. javanicus – (Horsfield, 1821)	Europe and the Palearctic (northwestern Africa and central and southern Europe to southeastern Siberia, eastern China and south to Pakistan and northern India)	Size: Habitat: Diet:	LC
Black-fronted tern	Chlidonias albostriatus (Gray, 1845)	New Zealand	Size: Habitat: Diet:	EN

Notice the hesitation in the gender of the epithet of the scientific names, as they are usually masculine (albostriatus, leucopterus or niger), but in the case of the whiskered tern is mostly used as feminine (hybrida), maybe from the influence of the previous gender used, Sterna.

The black-bellied tern (Sterna acuticauda) and the white-cheeked tern (Sterna repressa) might also be placed in Chlidonias.
