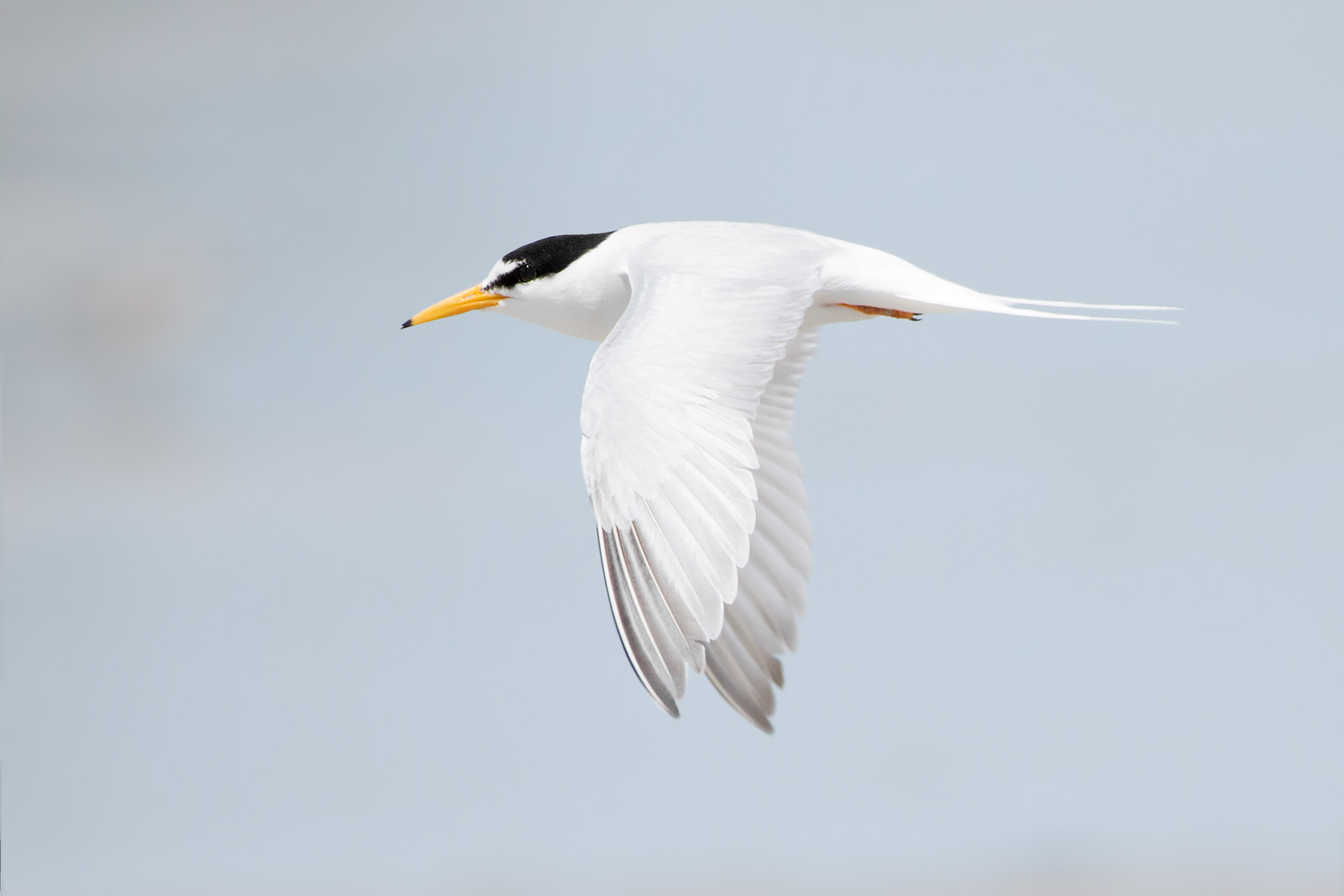
- Little tern

Scientific classification
- Kingdom: Animalia
- Phylum: Chordata
- Class: Aves
- Order: Charadriiformes
- Family: Laridae
- Subfamily: Sterninae
- Genus: Sternula; F. Boie, 1822

Type species
- Sterna minuta Linnaeus, 1766=Sterna albifrons Pallas, 1764

Species
- 7, see text

= Sternula =

Genus of birds

Sternula is a genus of small white terns, with a global distribution along sheltered sandy coasts and large rivers.

== Taxonomy ==
The genus Sternula was introduced in 1822 by the German zoologist Friedrich Boie to accommodate a single species, Sterna minuta Linnaeus, 1766. This scientific name is a junior synonym of Sterna albifrons Pallas, 1764, the little tern. The genus name Sternula is a diminutive of Sterna that was introduced by Carl Linnaeus in 1758.

The seven species are all closely related, with similar plumage and size, all are between 22–28 cm long and 39–63 g weight. All are pale grey above, and white or very pale grey below; in all the outer primaries are darker grey (to nearly blackish), but the number of primaries that are dark varies slightly between the species. Most have a distinctive head pattern in the breeding season, with a black crown and eyeline, and a white forehead; one (fairy tern) differs in lacking the black eye line, and one (Damara tern) has a fully black crown with no white forehead in the breeding season. The legs and bill are mostly yellow (with or without a black tip) in the breeding season, but black in Damara tern. In all species the winter plumage has a more extensive white forehead, the bill is black, and the legs darker red-brown to blackish.

Although the genus was first described in 1822, the species in the genus were generally retained within the larger genus Sterna, the genus that holds most terns, until a study in 2005 showed that this treatment was paraphyletic, with these seven species less closely related to typical Sterna terns, than several other terns long treated in other genera like Chlidonias and Larosterna.

Sternula diverged early from other terns about 16 million years ago, with only the very different noddies (Anous and Gygis), and the 'brown-backed' Onychoprion terns diverging earlier. Despite the early origin of the genus, the current diversity within the genus is much more recent, with the species having a common ancestor around 4 million years ago. Saunders's and least terns were both formerly considered to be subspecies of little tern.

== Species ==
The genus contains seven species:

| Image | Common name | Scientific name | Distribution |
|---|---|---|---|
| | Damara tern | Sternula balaenarum | breeds coastal Namibia to Cape Province; winters to northern Angola |
| | Fairy tern | Sternula nereis | Australia, New Caledonia, northern New Zealand |
| | Little tern | Sternula albifrons | |
| | Yellow-billed tern | Sternula superciliaris | |
| | Peruvian tern | Sternula lorata | |
| | Saunders's tern | Sternula saundersi | breeds Red Sea and Persian Gulf to islands between India and Sri Lanka; winters mainly Seychelles to Maldives and Cocos Islands (Keeling) Islands |
| | Least tern | Sternula antillarum | |
