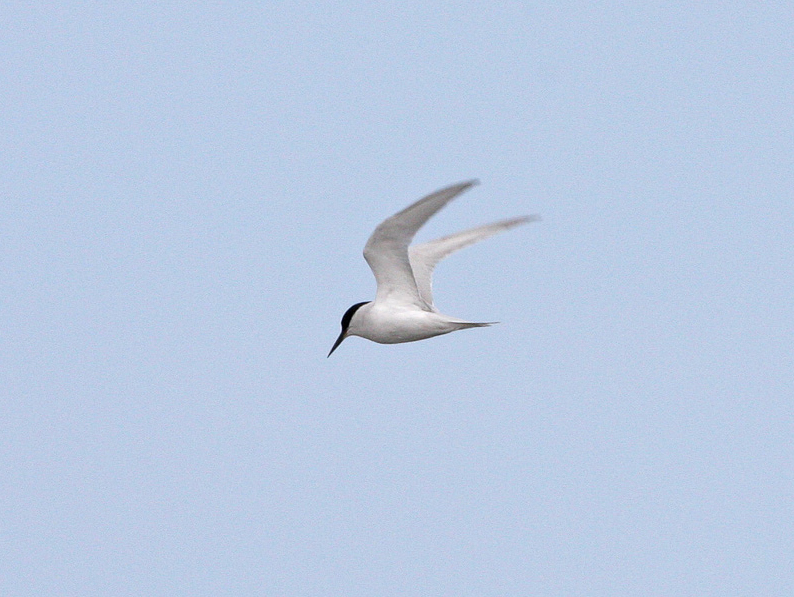

Conservation status
- Least Concern (IUCN 3.1)

Scientific classification
- Kingdom: Animalia
- Phylum: Chordata
- Class: Aves
- Order: Charadriiformes
- Family: Laridae
- Genus: Sternula
- Species: S. balaenarum

Binomial name
- Sternula balaenarum Strickland, 1853

Synonyms
- Sterna balaenarum

= Damara tern =

Species of bird

The Damara tern (Sternula balaenarum) is a species of small tern in the family Laridae which breeds in the southern summer in southern Africa and migrates to tropical African coasts to winter.

== Description ==
At 23 centimetres or 9.1 inches in length the Damara tern is a small, rather pale tern. In breeding plumage, the adult has a black cap extending from forehead onto the nape and a very pale grey back. In flight, it displays a black triangular wing tip which runs from the carpal joint to the tip of the wing. In non-breeding plumage the adult shows white on the forehead and crown, with a black mask around the eyes extending to the nape. Immature birds are marked with buff bars across the mantle.

=== Voice ===
The calls of the Damara tern are a high-pitched, sharp "tsit tsit" and quick, harsh "kid-ick".

== Distribution and habitat ==
It breeds in western coastal Southern Africa from the Eastern Cape through the Western Cape and Northern Cape into Namibia and Angola; 98% of the population of 14,000 individuals nests in Namibia. The majority of non-breeding birds migrate north reaching Benin, Cameroon, Republic of the Congo, Democratic Republic of the Congo, Ivory Coast, Gabon, Ghana, Liberia, Nigeria, and Togo in the Atlantic, and a small number migrate northwards in the Indian Ocean to spend the non-breeding period in Mozambique.

The Damara tern generally prefers shorelines in arid, desert regions particularly where there are sheltered bays, estuaries, lagoons and reefs. As breeding areas, it uses gravel plains between dunes and on salt pans.

== Habits ==
The Damara tern eats mainly small fish, with the occasional squid, which are caught in repeated plunge dives from a height of 3–8 m (10–26 ft). Their migration is timed to coincide with spawning shoals of small fish in the shallow coastal waters of the Gulf of Guinea caused by strong upwellings at the coast of Ghana. These wintering birds roost communally but feed solitarily, spacing themselves at 10-50m from other Damara terns.

Eggs are laid in a plain scrape in the substrate which is sometimes lined with shell chips or small stones. The clutch normally consists of one, occasionally two eggs with an incubation period of 18–22 days. For the first few days the female broods the chicks and food is provided by the male. The chicks leave the scrape at a few days old and move towards the shore and fledge after 20 days forming juvenile flocks. The juveniles are dependent on the adults for two and half months after they have fledged.

== Taxonomy ==
This species was previously included in the genus Sterna but with other small terns such as the little tern and the least tern it is now considered to be within the genus Sternula.
