= Sterna milne-edwardsii =

Sterna milne-edwardsii Temporal range: Miocene

Scientific classification
- Domain: Eukaryota
- Kingdom: Animalia
- Phylum: Chordata
- Class: Aves
- Order: Charadriiformes
- Family: Laridae
- Genus: Sterna
- Species: †S. milne-edwardsii

Binomial name
- †Sterna milne-edwardsii Riabinin 1931

Extinct species of bird

Sterna milne-edwardsii is an extinct tern from the Miocene. It was named after Alphonse Milne-Edwards a French ornithologist specialising in fossil birds.
