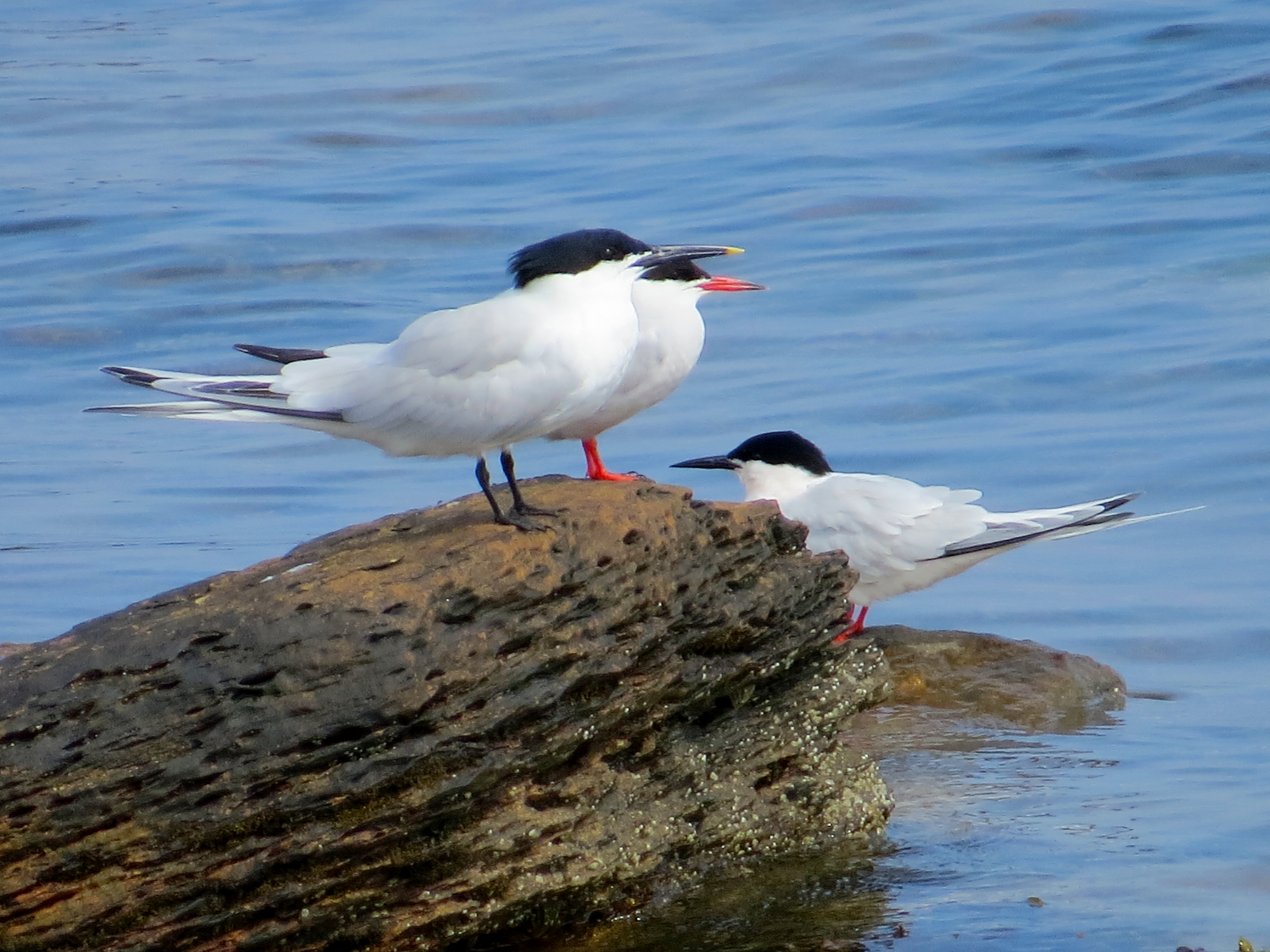
- A Sandwich tern, a common tern and a roseate tern together, Northumberland, UK

Scientific classification
- Kingdom: Animalia
- Phylum: Chordata
- Class: Aves
- Order: Charadriiformes
- Family: Laridae
- Subfamily: Sterninae; Bonaparte, 1838

Genera
- Anous; Chlidonias; Gelochelidon; Gygis; Hydroprogne; Larosterna; Onychoprion; Phaetusa; Sterna; Sternula; Thalasseus

= Tern =

Terns Temporal range: Early Miocene to present

Subfamily of seabirds

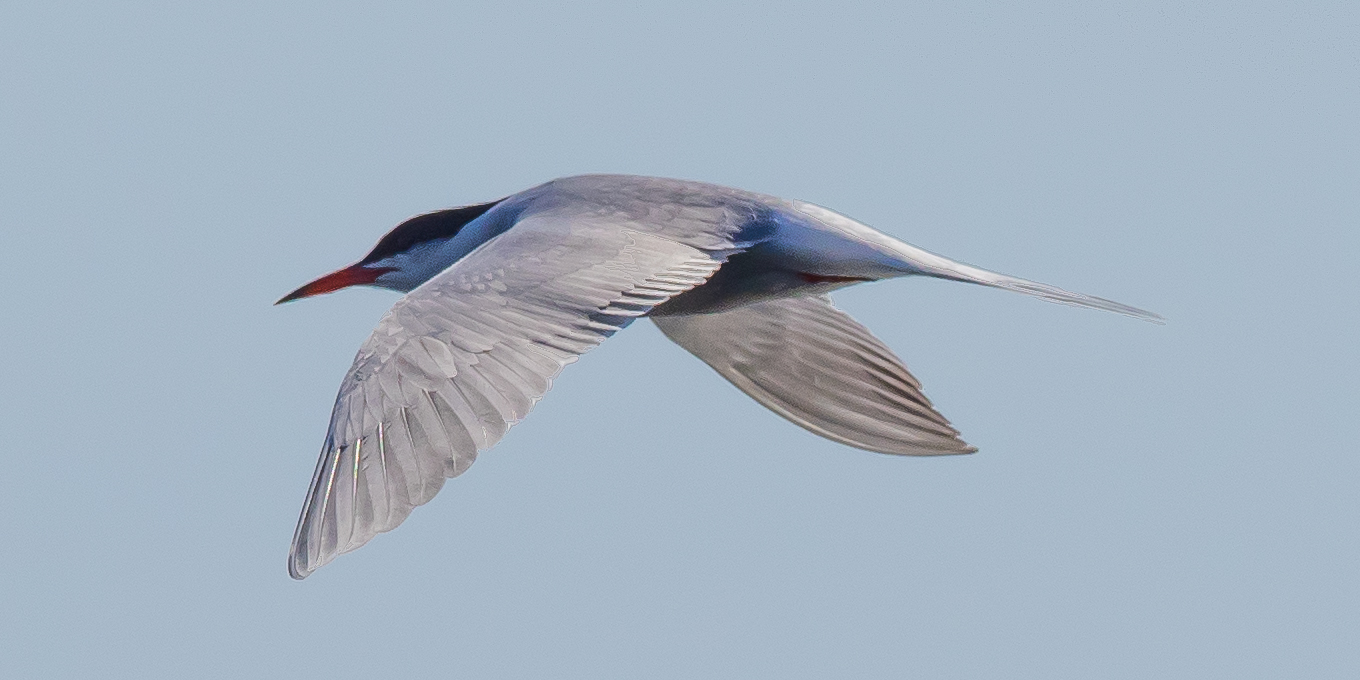
Common tern in flight

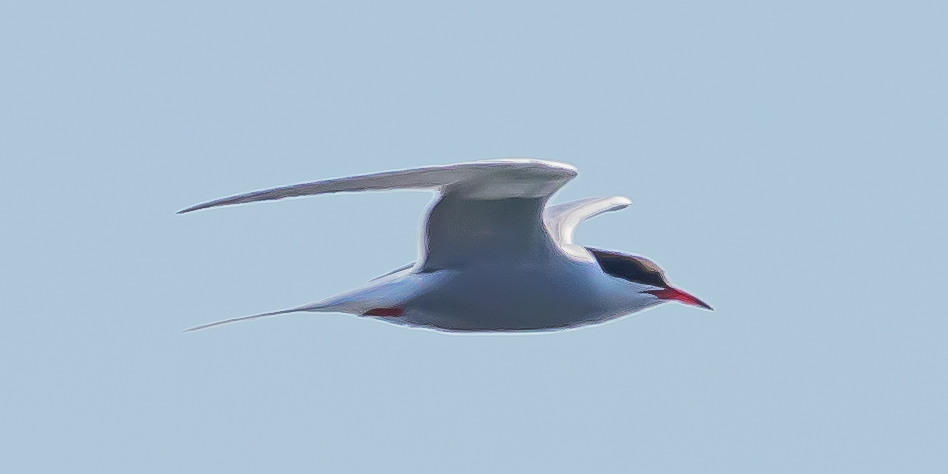
Common tern in flight

Terns are seabirds in the subfamily Sterninae of the wider gull and tern family Laridae. They have a worldwide distribution and are normally found near the sea, rivers, or wetlands. Terns are treated in eleven genera in a subgroup of the family Laridae, which also includes several genera of gulls and the skimmers (Rynchops). They are slender, lightly built birds with long, forked tails, narrow wings, long bills, and relatively short legs. Most species are pale grey above and white below with a contrasting black cap to the head, but the marsh terns, the black-bellied tern, the Inca tern, and some noddies have dark body plumage for at least part of the year. The sexes are identical in appearance, but young birds are readily distinguishable from adults. Terns have a non-breeding plumage, which usually involves a white forehead and much-reduced black cap.

Terns are long-lived birds and are relatively free from natural predators and parasites; most species are declining in numbers due directly or indirectly to human activities, including habitat loss, pollution, disturbance, and predation by introduced mammals. The Chinese crested tern is critically endangered and three other species are classed as endangered. International agreements provide a measure of protection, but adults and eggs of some species are still used for food in the tropics.

== Description ==
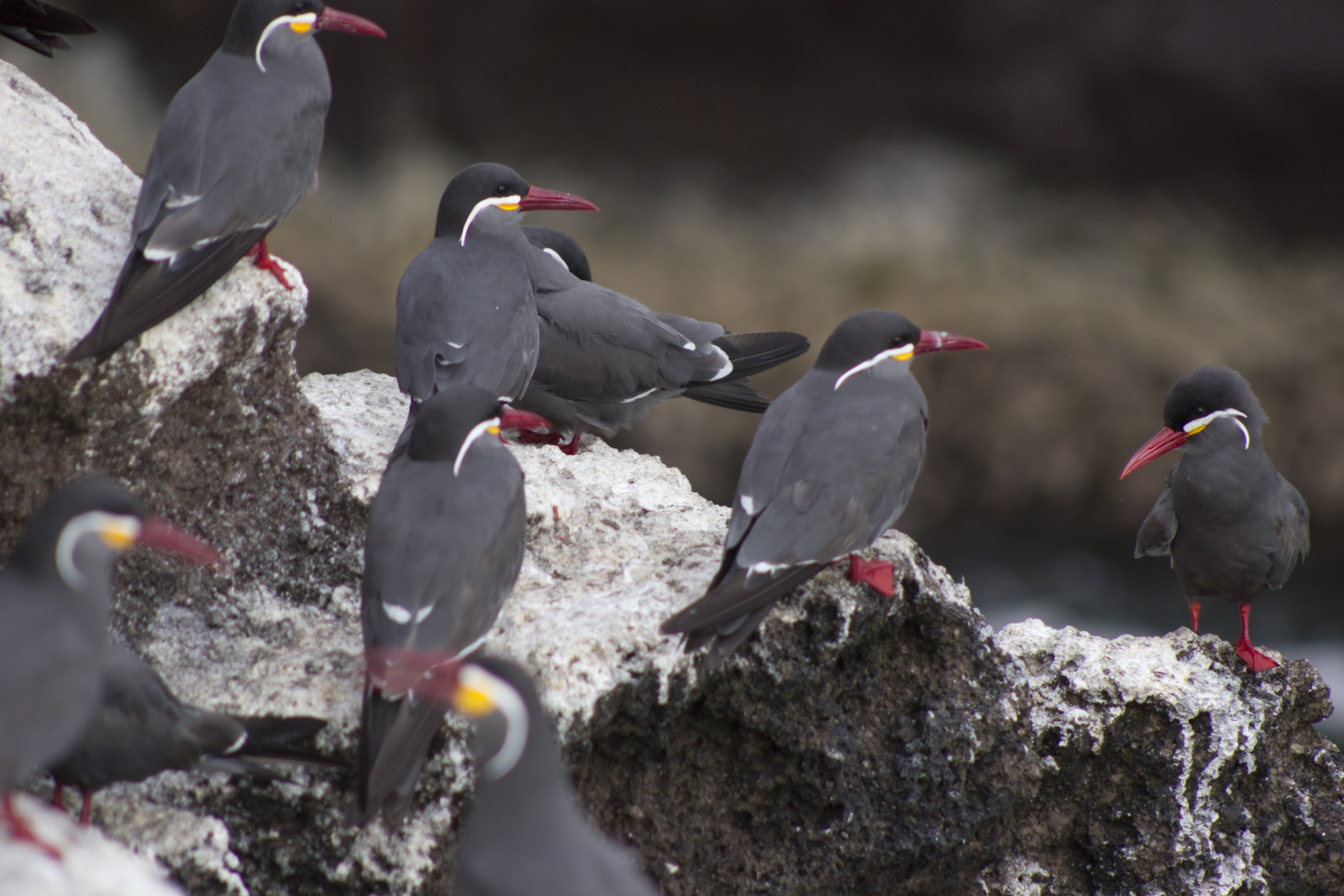
The plumage of the Inca tern is the most atypical of the group.

Terns range in size from the least tern, at 23 cm (9 in) in length and weighing 30–45 g (1.1–1.6 oz), to the Caspian tern at 48–56 cm (19–22 in), 500–700 g (18–25 oz). They are longer-billed, lighter-bodied, and more streamlined than gulls, and their long tails and long narrow wings give them an elegance in flight. Male and female plumages are identical, although the male can be 2–5% larger than the female and often has a relatively larger bill. Sea terns have deeply forked tails, and at least a shallow "V" is shown by all other species. The noddies (genus Anous) have unusual notched-wedge shaped tails, the longest tail feathers being the middle-outer, rather than the central or outermost. Although their legs are short, terns can run well. They rarely swim, despite having webbed feet, usually landing on water only to bathe.

The majority of sea terns have light grey or white body plumage as adults, with a black cap to the head. The legs and bill are various combinations of red, orange, yellow, or black depending on species. The pale plumage is conspicuous from a distance at sea, and may attract other birds to a good feeding area for these fish-eating species. When seen against the sky, the white underparts also help to hide the hunting bird from its intended prey. The Inca tern has mainly dark plumage, and three species that mainly eat insects, black tern, white-winged tern, and black-bellied tern, have black underparts in the breeding season. Three of the noddies (brown noddy, black noddy, and lesser noddy) have dark plumage with a pale head cap, while the other two noddies (blue noddy and grey noddy, both of which were formerly placed in the genus Procelsterna) have paler grey plumage. The reason for their dark plumage is unknown, but it has been suggested that in tropical areas, where food resources are scarce, the less conspicuous colouration makes it harder for other noddies to detect a feeding bird. Plumage type, especially the head pattern, is linked to the phylogeny of the terns, and the pale-capped, dark-bodied noddies are believed to have diverged earlier than the other genera from an ancestral white-headed gull, followed by the partially black-headed Onychoprion and Sternula groupings.

Juvenile terns typically have brown- or yellow-tinged upperparts, and the feathers have dark edges that give the plumage a scaly appearance. They have dark bands on the wings and short tails. In most species, the subsequent moult does not start until after migration, the plumage then becoming more like the adult, but with some retained juvenile feathers and a white forehead with only a partial dark cap. By the second summer, the appearance is very like the adult, and full mature plumage is usually attained by the third year. After breeding, terns moult into a winter plumage, typically showing a white forehead. Heavily worn or aberrant plumages such as melanism and albinism are much rarer in terns than in gulls.

=== Voice ===
Common tern (80 s)

Terns have a wide repertoire of vocalisations. For example, the common tern has a distinctive alarm, kee-yah, also used as a warning to intruders, and a shorter kyar, given as an individual takes flight in response to a more serious threat; this quietens the usually noisy colony while its residents assess the danger. Other calls include a down-slurred keeur given when an adult is approaching the nest with a fish, and a kip uttered during social contact. Parents and chicks can locate one another by call, and siblings also recognise each other's vocalisations from about the twelfth day after hatching, which helps to keep the brood together.

Vocal differences reinforce species separation between closely related birds such as the least and little terns, and can help humans distinguish similar species, such as common and arctic terns, since flight calls are unique to each species.

== Taxonomy ==
The bird order Charadriiformes contains 18 coastal seabird and wader families. Within the order, the terns form a lineage with the gulls, and, less closely, with the skimmers, skuas, and auks. Early authors such as Conrad Gessner, Francis Willughby, and William Turner did not clearly separate terns from gulls, but Linnaeus recognised the distinction in his 1758 Systema Naturae, placing the gulls in the genus Larus and the terns in Sterna. He gave Sterna the description rostrum subulatum, "awl-shaped bill", referring to the long, pointed bills typical of this group of birds, a feature that distinguishes them from the thicker-billed gulls. Behaviour and morphology suggest that the terns are more closely related to the gulls than to the skimmers or skuas, and although Charles Lucien Bonaparte created the family Sternidae for the terns in 1838, for many years they were considered to be a subfamily, Sterninae, of the gull family, Laridae. Relationships between various tern species, and between the terns and the other Charadriiformes, were formerly difficult to resolve because of a poor fossil record and the misidentification of some finds.

Following genetic research in the early twenty-first century, the terns were historically treated as a separate family, Sternidae. Most terns were formerly treated as belonging to one large genus, Sterna, with just a few dark species placed in other genera; in one 1959 paper, only the noddies and the Inca tern were excluded from Sterna. A recent analysis of DNA sequences supported the splitting of Sterna into several smaller genera. One study of part of the cytochrome b gene sequence found a close relationship between terns and a group of waders in the suborder Thinocori. These results are in disagreement with other molecular and morphological studies, and have been interpreted as showing either a large degree of molecular convergent evolution between the terns and these waders, or the retention of an ancient genotype.

Research in 2007 had suggested that the noddies were not terns at all, but were basal to all the other genera in Laridae, a taxonomy that was followed by the IOC World Bird List for several years up to 2023, but more comprehensive analysis has now shown that the noddies are basal to only the other terns, not the whole family; this has now been followed by the IOC World Bird List version 14.1 in 2024.

=== Etymology ===
The word "stearn" was used for these birds in Old English as early as the eighth century, and appears in the poem The Seafarer, written in the ninth century or earlier. Variants such as "tearn" occurred by the eleventh century, although the older form lingered on in Norfolk dialect for several centuries. As now, the term was used for the inland black tern as well as the marine species. Some authorities consider "tearn" and similar forms to be variants of "stearn", while others derive the English words from Scandinavian equivalents such as Danish and Norwegian terne or Swedish tärna, and ultimately from Old Norse þerna. Linnaeus adopted "stearn" or "sterna" (which the naturalist William Turner had used in 1544 as a Latinisation of an English word, presumably "stern", for the black tern) or a North Germanic equivalent for his genus name Sterna. All of these names are ultimately onomatopoeic, derived from the bird's calls.

=== Species ===
The cladogram shows the relationships between the tern genera, and the currently recognised species, based on mitochondrial DNA studies, are listed below in the taxonomic sequence used by the Avilist.

- - Anous
  - - Gygis
    - - Onychoprion
      - - Sternula
        - - Phaetusa
          - - - Gelochelidon
              - Hydroprogne
            - - Larosterna
              - - Chlidonias
                - - Thalasseus
                  - Sterna

Based on Bridge et al (2005) and Černý & Natale (2021)

Image	Genus	Species
	Gygis Wagler, 1832 — noddies or white terns	Atlantic white tern (Gygis alba); Blue-billed white tern (G. candida; recently split from G. alba); Little white tern (G. microrhyncha; recently split from G. alba)
	Anous Stephens, 1826 — noddies	Brown noddy (Anous stolidus); Lesser noddy (A. tenuirostris); Black noddy (A. minutus; sometimes considered to be a subspecies of lesser noddy); Grey noddy (A. albivitta; sometimes considered to be a subspecies of blue noddy; formerly placed in a separate genus Procelsterna); Blue noddy (A. cerulea; formerly placed in a separate genus Procelsterna)
	Onychoprion Wagler, 1832 — brown-backed terns	Aleutian tern (Onychoprion aleuticus); Sooty tern (O. fuscatus); Spectacled tern (O. lunatus); Bridled tern (O. anaethetus)
	Sternula F. Boie, 1822 — little terns	Damara tern (Sternula balaenarum); Fairy tern (S. nereis); Little tern (S. albifrons); Yellow-billed tern (S. superciliaris); Peruvian tern (S. lorata); Saunders's tern (S. saundersi; formerly considered to be a subspecies of little tern); Least tern (S. antillarum; formerly considered to be a subspecies of little tern)
	Phaetusa — large-billed tern	Large-billed tern (Phaetusa simplex)
	Hydroprogne Kaup, 1829— Caspian tern	Caspian tern (Hydroprogne caspia)
	Gelochelidon Brehm, 1830 — gull-billed terns	Australian tern (Gelochelidon macrotarsa); Gull-billed tern (G. nilotica)
	Larosterna — Inca tern	Inca tern (Larosterna inca)
	Chlidonias Rafinesque, 1822 — marsh terns	Whiskered tern (Chlidonias hybridus); Black-fronted tern (C. albostriatus sometimes placed in Sterna); White-winged tern (or white-winged black tern; C. leucopterus); Black tern (C. niger)
	Thalasseus F. Boie, 1822 — crested terns	Sandwich tern (T. sandvicensis); Cabot's tern (T. acuflavidus recently split from T. sandvicensis); Elegant tern (T. elegans); Chinese crested tern (T. bernsteini); Greater crested tern (T. bergii also known as swift tern); Royal tern (T. maximus); West African crested tern (Thalasseus albididorsalis; recently split from T. maximus); Lesser crested tern (Thalasseus bengalensis)
	Sterna Linnaeus, 1758 — large white terns	River tern (Sterna aurantia); Forster's tern (S. forsteri); Snowy-crowned tern (S. trudeaui); Arctic tern (S. paradisaea); South American tern (S. hirundinacea); Antarctic tern (S. vittata); Kerguelen tern (S. virgata); Common tern (S. hirundo); White-cheeked tern (S. repressa); Black-naped tern (S. sumatrana); Roseate tern (S. dougallii); White-fronted tern (S. striata); Black-bellied tern (S. acuticauda)

In addition to extant species, the fossil record includes a Miocene palaeospecies, Sterna milne-edwardsii.

The birds in the genus Anous are known as noddies, the Chlidonias species are the marsh terns, and all other species comprise the sea terns.

== Distribution and habitat ==
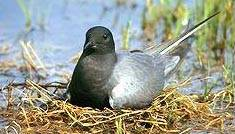
The black tern breeds on inland marshes.

Terns have a worldwide distribution, breeding on all continents including Antarctica. The northernmost and southernmost breeders are the Arctic tern and Antarctic tern respectively. Many terns breeding in temperate zones are long-distance migrants, and the Arctic tern sees more annual daylight than any other animal as it migrates from its northern breeding grounds to Antarctic waters, a return journey of more than 30,000 km (19,000 mi). A common tern that hatched in Sweden and was found dead five months later on Stewart Island, New Zealand, must have flown at least 25,000 km (16,000 mi). Actual flight distances are, of course, much greater than the shortest possible route. Arctic terns from Greenland were shown by radio geolocation to average 70,000 km (43,000 mi) on their annual migrations, while another from the Farne Islands in Northumberland tagged 'G82' covered a staggering 96,000 km in just 10 months from the end of one breeding season to the start of the next, travelling not just the length of the Atlantic Ocean and the width of the Indian Ocean, but also half way across the South Pacific to the boundary between the Ross and Amundsen Seas before returning back west.

Most terns breed on open sandy or rocky areas on coasts and islands. The yellow-billed, large-billed, and black-fronted terns breed only on rivers, and common, least and little terns also sometimes use inland locations. The marsh terns, Trudeau's tern and some Forster's terns nest in inland marshes. The black noddy and the white tern nest above ground level on cliffs or in trees. Migratory terns move to the coast after breeding, and most species winter near land, although some marine species, like the Aleutian tern, may wander far from land. The sooty tern is entirely oceanic when not breeding, and healthy young birds are not seen on land for up to five years after fledging until they return to breed. They lack waterproof plumage, so they cannot rest on the sea. Where they spend the years prior to breeding is unknown.

== Behaviour ==
The terns are birds of open habitats that typically breed in noisy colonies and lay their eggs on bare ground with little or no nest material. Marsh terns construct floating nests from the vegetation in their wetland habitats, and a few species build simple nests in trees, on cliffs or in crevices. The white tern, uniquely, lays its single egg on a bare tree branch. Depending on the species, one to three eggs make up the clutch. Most species feed on fish caught by diving from flight, but the marsh terns are insect-eaters, and some large terns will supplement their diet with small land vertebrates. Many terns are long-distance migrants, and the Arctic tern may see more daylight in a year than any other animal.

=== Breeding ===
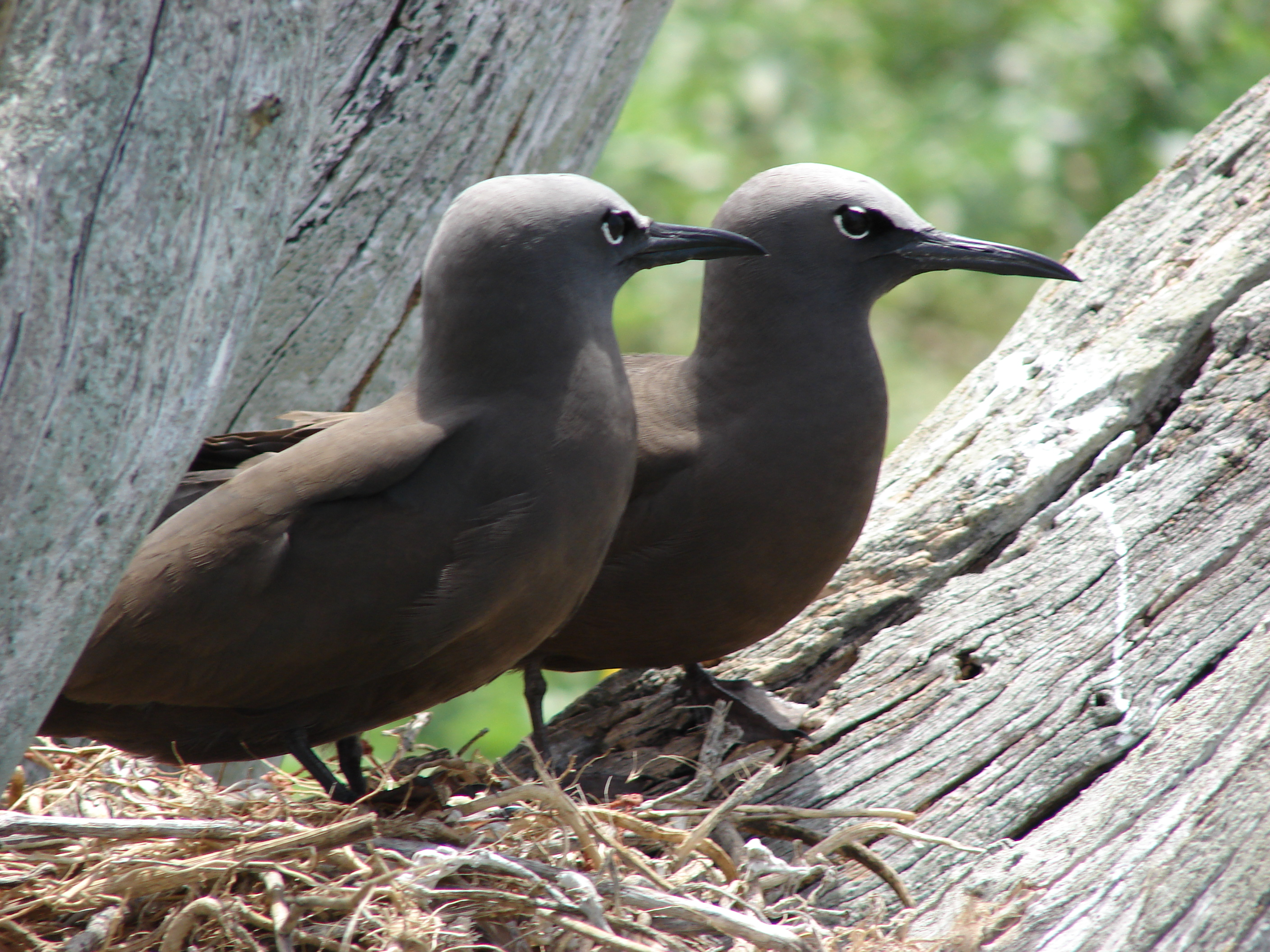
Brown noddy nest on stump of Casuarina equisetifolia

Terns are normally monogamous, although trios or female-female pairings have been observed in at least three species. Most terns breed annually and at the same time of year, but some tropical species may nest at intervals shorter than 12 months or asynchronously. Most terns become sexually mature when aged three, although some small species may breed in their second year. Some large sea terns, including the sooty and bridled terns, are four or older when they first breed. Terns normally breed in colonies, and are site-faithful if their habitat is sufficiently stable. A few species nest in small or dispersed groups, but most breed in colonies of up to a few hundred pairs, often alongside other seabirds such as gulls or skimmers. Large tern species tend to form larger colonies, which in the case of the sooty tern can contain up to two million pairs. Large species nest very close together and sit tightly, making it difficult for aerial predators to land among them. Smaller species are less closely packed and mob intruders. Peruvian and Damara terns have small dispersed colonies and rely on the cryptic plumage of the eggs and young for protection.

The male selects a territory, which he defends against conspecifics, and re-establishes a pair bond with his mate or attracts a new female if necessary. Courtship involves ritualised flight and ground displays, and the male often presents a fish to his partner. Most species have little or no nest, laying the eggs onto bare ground, but Trudeau's tern, Forster's tern and the marsh terns construct floating nests from the vegetation in their wetland habitats. Black and lesser noddies build nests of twigs, feathers and excreta on tree branches, and brown, blue, and grey noddies make rough platforms of grass and seaweed on cliff ledges, in cavities or on other rocky surfaces. The Inca tern nests in crevices, caves and disused burrows, such as that of a Humboldt penguin. The white tern is unique in that it lays its single egg on a bare tree branch.

Tropical species usually lay just one egg, but two or three is typical in cooler regions if there is an adequate food supply. The time taken to complete the clutch varies, but for temperate species incubation takes 21–28 days. The eggs of most gulls and terns are brown with dark splotches, so they are difficult for predators to spot on the beach. The precocial chicks fledge in about four weeks after hatching. Tropical species take longer because of the poorer food supply. Both parents incubate the eggs and feed the chicks, although the female does more incubating and less fishing than her partner. Young birds migrate with the adults. Terns are generally long-lived birds, with individuals typically returning for 7–10 breeding seasons. Maximum known ages include 34 for an Arctic tern and 32 for a sooty. Although several other species are known to live in captivity for up to 20 years, their greatest recorded ages are underestimates because the birds can outlive their rings. Interbreeding between tern species is rare, and involves closely related species when it occurs. Hybrids recorded include common tern with roseate, Sandwich with lesser-crested, and black with white-winged.

=== Feeding ===
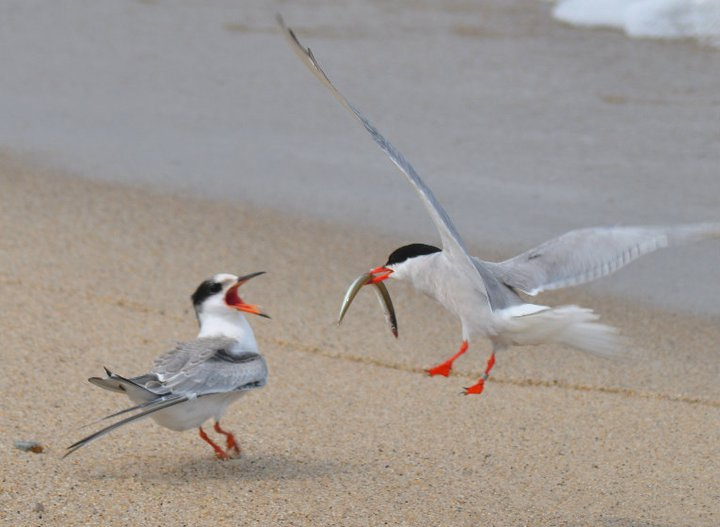
An adult common tern bringing a sand eel to a juvenile

Most terns hunt fish by diving, often hovering first, and the particular approach technique used can help to distinguish similar species at a distance. Sea terns often hunt in association with porpoises or predatory fish, such as bluefish, tuna or bonitos, since these large marine animals drive the prey to the surface. Sooty terns feed at night as the fish rise to the surface, and are believed to sleep on the wing since they become waterlogged easily. Terns of several species will feed on invertebrates, following the plough or hunting on foot on mudflats. The marsh terns normally catch insects in the air or pick them off the surface of fresh water. Other species will sometimes use these techniques if the opportunity arises. An individual tern's foraging efficiency increases with its age.

The gull-billed tern is an opportunist predator, taking a wide variety of prey from marine, freshwater and terrestrial habitats. Depending on what is available it will eat small crabs, fish, crayfish, grasshoppers and other large insects, lizards and amphibians. Warm-blooded prey includes mice and the eggs and chicks of other beach-breeding birds; least terns, little terns and members of its own species may be victims. The greater crested tern will also occasionally catch unusual vertebrate species such as agamid lizards and green sea turtle hatchlings, and follows trawlers for discards.

The eyes of terns cannot accommodate under water, so they rely on accurate sighting from the air before they plunge-dive. Like other seabirds that feed at the surface or dive for food, terns have red oil droplets in the cones of their retinas; birds that have to look through an air/water interface have more deeply coloured carotenoid pigments in the oil drops than other species. The pigment also improves visual contrast and sharpens distance vision, especially in hazy conditions, and helps terns to locate shoals of fish, although it is uncertain whether they are sighting the phytoplankton on which the fish feed, or other feeding birds. The red colouring reduces ultraviolet sensitivity, which in any case is an adaptation more suited to terrestrial feeders like the gulls, and this protects the eye from UV damage.

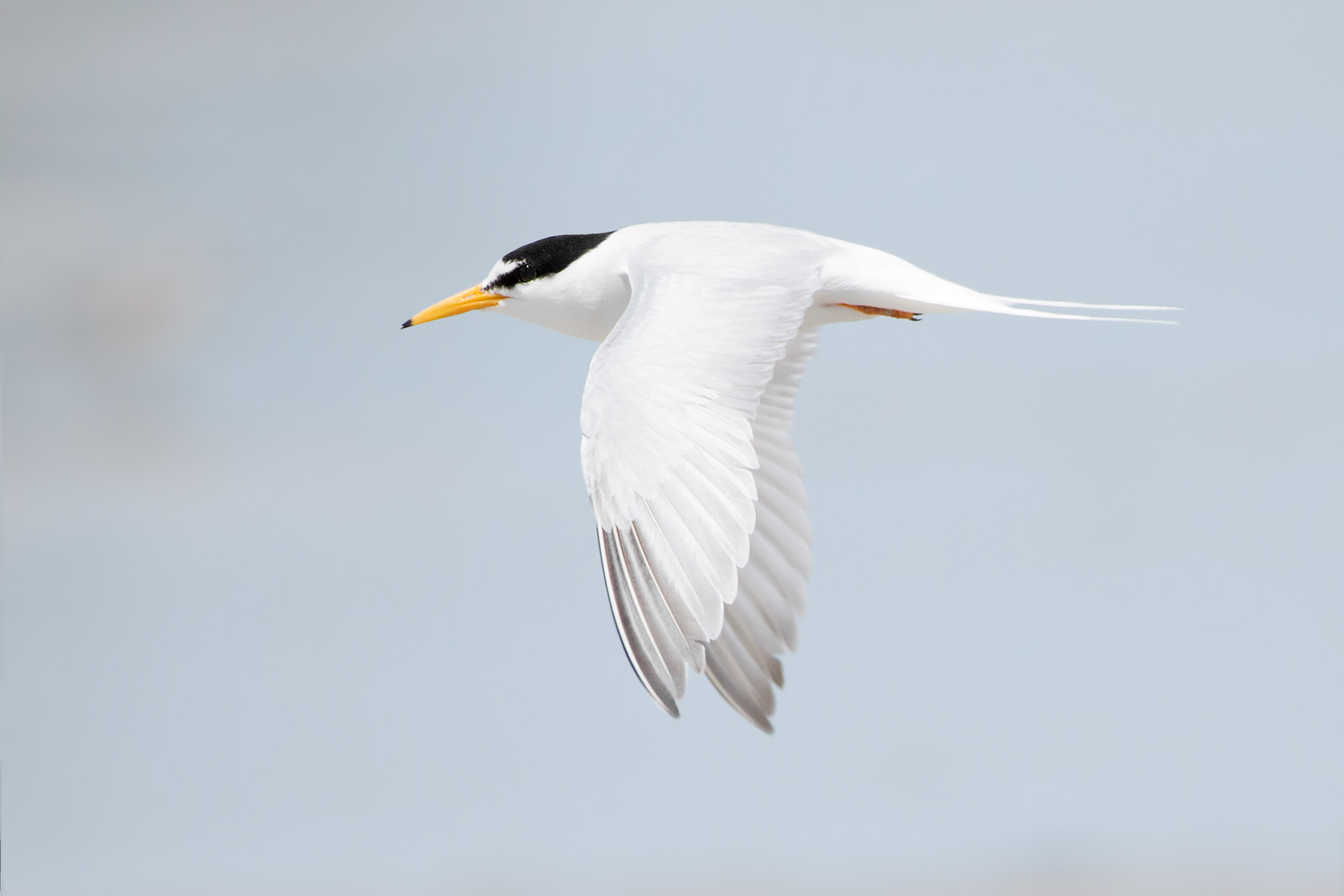
Little tern in flight showing the forked tail

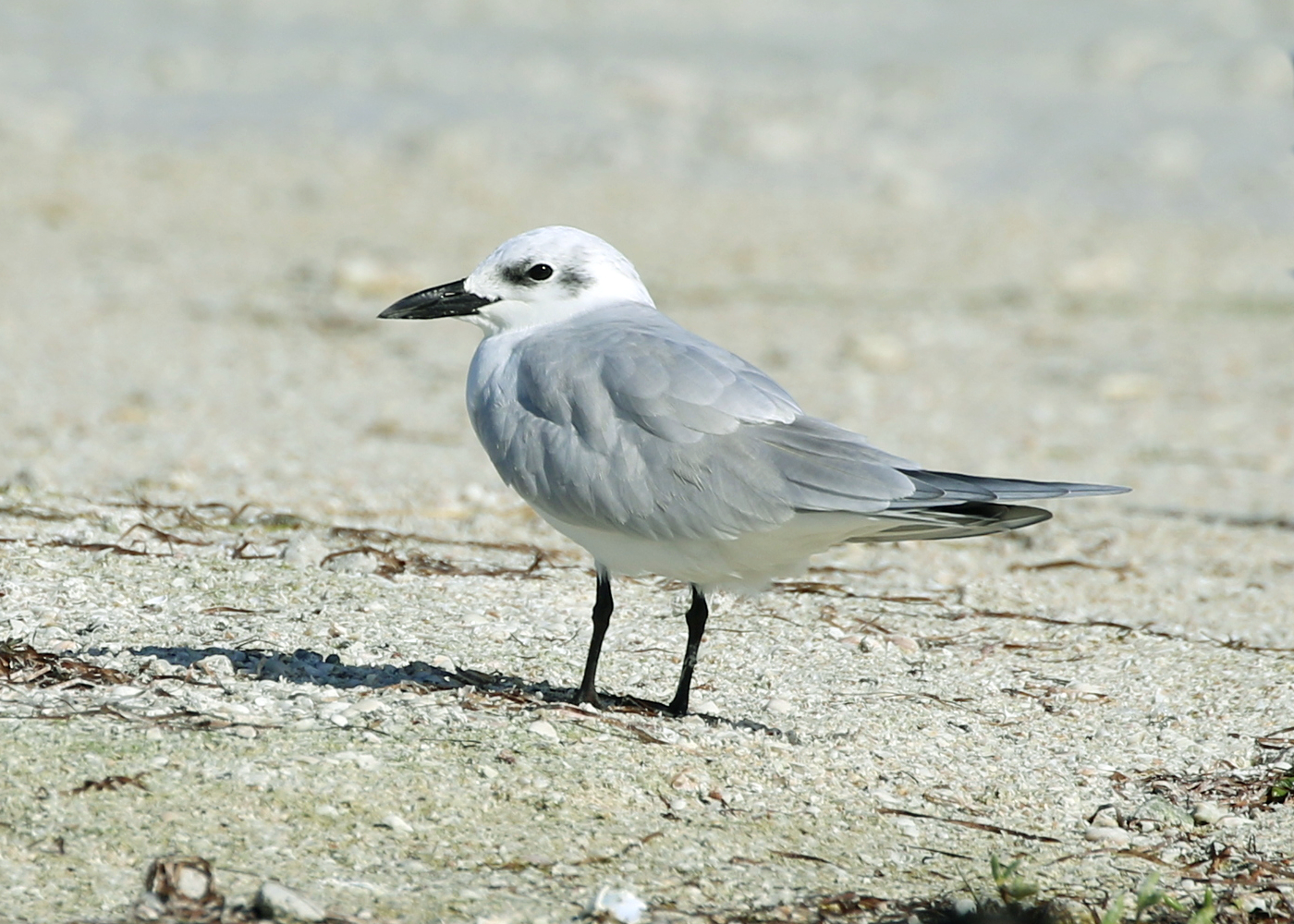
The gull-billed tern will sometimes prey on the chicks and young of other terns

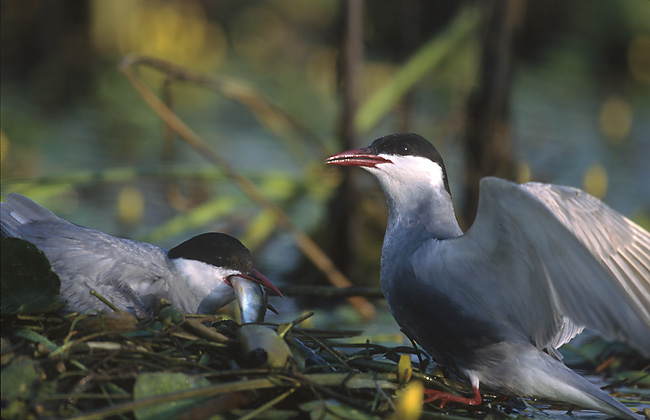
The whiskered tern is an insect-eating marsh tern

== Predators and parasites ==
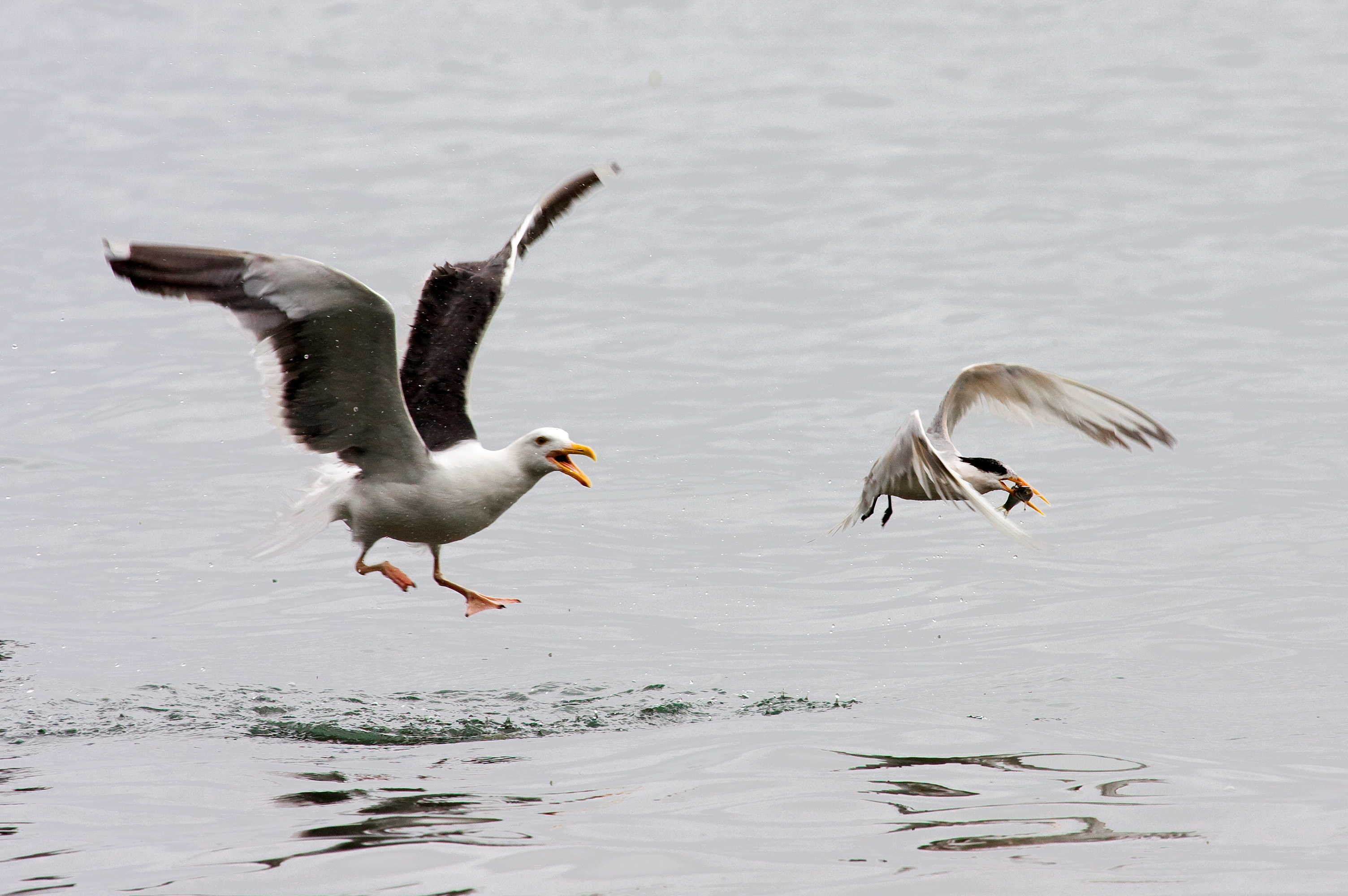
Kleptoparasitic western gull chasing an elegant tern

The inaccessibility of many tern colonies gave them a measure of protection from mammalian predators, especially on islands, but introduced species brought by humans can seriously affect breeding birds. These can be predators such as foxes, raccoons, cats and rats, or animals that destroy the habitat, including rabbits, goats and pigs. Problems arise not only on formerly mammal-free islands, as in New Zealand, but also where an alien carnivore, such as the American mink in Scotland, presents an unfamiliar threat.

Adult terns may be hunted by owls and raptors, and their chicks and eggs may be taken by herons, crows or gulls. Less obvious nest predators include ruddy turnstones in the Arctic, and gull-billed terns in little tern colonies. Adults may be robbed of their catch by avian kleptoparasites such as frigatebirds, skuas, other terns or large gulls.

External parasites include chewing lice of the genus Saemundssonia, feather lice and fleas such as Ceratophyllus borealis. Lice are often host specific, and the closely related common and Arctic terns carry quite different species. Internal parasites include the crustacean Reighardia sternae, and tapeworms such as Ligula intestinalis and members of the genera Diphyllobothrium and Schistocephalus. Terns are normally free of blood parasites, unlike gulls that often carry Haemoproteus species. An exception is the brown noddy, which sometimes harbours protozoa of that genus. In 1961 the common tern was the first wild bird species identified as being infected with avian influenza, the H5N3 variant being found in an outbreak involving South African birds. Several species of terns have been implicated as carriers of West Nile virus.

== Relationships with humans ==
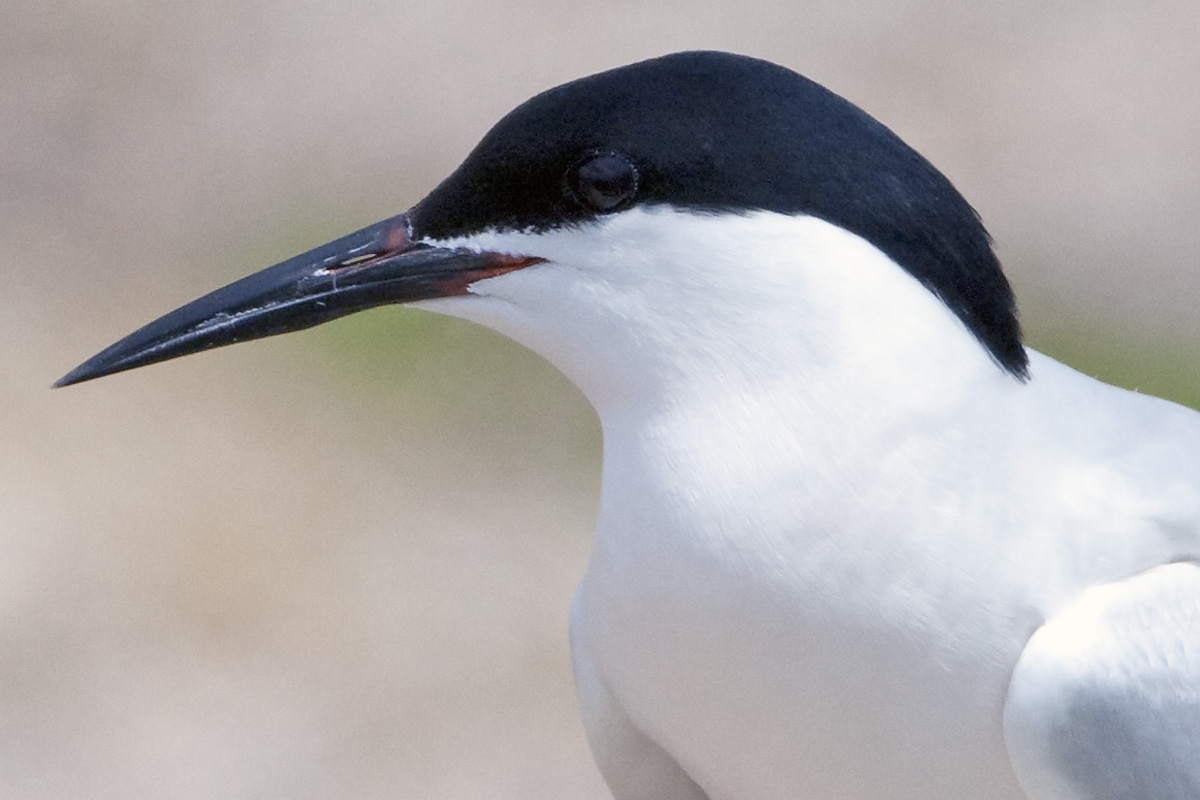
The roseate tern is trapped for food on its wintering grounds.

Terns and their eggs have long been eaten by humans and island colonies were raided by sailors on long voyages since the eggs or large chicks were an easily obtained source of protein. Eggs are still illegally harvested in southern Europe, and adult wintering birds are taken as food in West Africa and South America. The roseate tern is significantly affected by this hunting, with adult survival 10% lower than would otherwise be expected. In the West Indies, the eggs of roseate and sooty terns are believed to be aphrodisiacs, and are disproportionately targeted by egg collectors. Tern skins and feathers have long been used for making items of clothing such as capes and hats, and this became a large-scale activity in the second half of the nineteenth century when it became fashionable to use feathers in hatmaking. This trend started in Europe but soon spread to the Americas and Australia. White was the preferred colour, and sometimes wings or entire birds were used.

Terns have sometimes benefited from human activities, following the plough or fishing boats for easy food supplies, although some birds get trapped in nets or swallow plastic. Fishermen looked for feeding tern flocks, since the birds could lead them to fish shoals. Overfishing of small fish such as sand eels can lead to steep declines in the colonies relying on these prey items. More generally, the loss or disruption to tern colonies caused by human activities has caused declines in many species. Pollution has been a problem in some areas, and in the 1960s and 1970s DDT caused egg loss through thinning of the shells. In the 1980s, organochlorides caused severe declines in the Great Lakes area of the US. Because of their sensitivity to pollutants, terns are sometimes used as indicators of contamination levels.

Habitat enhancements used to increase the breeding success of terns include floating nest platforms for black, common and Caspian terns, and artificial islands created for a number of different species. More specialised interventions include providing nest boxes for roseate terns, which normally nest in the shelter of tallish vegetation, and using artificial eelgrass mats to encourage common terns to nest in areas not vulnerable to flooding.

== Conservation status ==
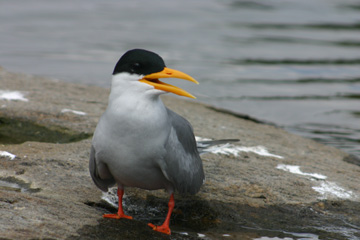
The black-bellied tern is endangered by human activities.

A number of terns face serious threats, and the Chinese crested tern is classed as "critically endangered" by BirdLife International. It has a population of fewer than 50 birds and a breeding range of just 9 km^{2} (3.5 sq mi). It is declining due to egg collection, human disturbance and the loss of coastal wetlands in China. Three other species are categorised as "endangered", with declining populations of less than 10,000 birds. The South Asian black-bellied tern is threatened by habitat loss, egg collecting for food, pollution and predation. In New Zealand, the black-fronted tern is facing a rapid fall in numbers due to predation by introduced mammals and Australian magpies. Disturbance by cattle and sheep and by human activities is also a factor. The Peruvian tern was initially damaged by the collapse of anchoveta stocks in 1972, but breeding colonies have subsequently been lost due to building, disturbance and pollution in their coastal wetlands.

The Australasian fairy tern is described as "vulnerable". Disturbance by humans, dogs and vehicles, predation by introduced species and inappropriate water level management in South Australia are the main reasons for its decline. Five species are "near threatened", indicating less severe concerns or only potential vulnerability. The elegant tern is so categorised because 95% of the population breeds on one island, Isla Rasa in the Gulf of California, and the Kerguelen tern has a population of less than 5,000 adults breeding on small and often stormy islands in the southern Indian Ocean. Three species, the Inca, Damara, and river terns, are expected to decline in the future due to habitat loss and disturbance. Some tern subspecies are endangered, including the California least tern and the Easter Island race of the grey noddy.

Most tern species are declining in numbers due to the loss or disturbance of breeding habitat, pollution and increased predation. Gull populations have increased over the last century because of reduced persecution and the availability of food from human activities, and terns have been forced out of many traditional nesting areas by the larger birds. A few species are defying the trend and showing local increases, including the Arctic tern in Scandinavia, Forster's tern around the Great Lakes, Cabot's tern in eastern North America and its yellow-billed subspecies, the Cayenne tern, in the Caribbean.

Terns are protected by international legislation such as the Agreement on the Conservation of African-Eurasian Migratory Waterbirds (AEWA) and the US-Canada Migratory Bird Treaty Act of 1918. Parties to the AWEA agreement are required to engage in a wide range of conservation strategies described in a detailed action plan. The plan is intended to address key issues such as species and habitat conservation, management of human activities, research, education, and implementation. The North American legislation is similar, although there is a greater emphasis on protection.

== See also ==
- Seabird breeding behavior
