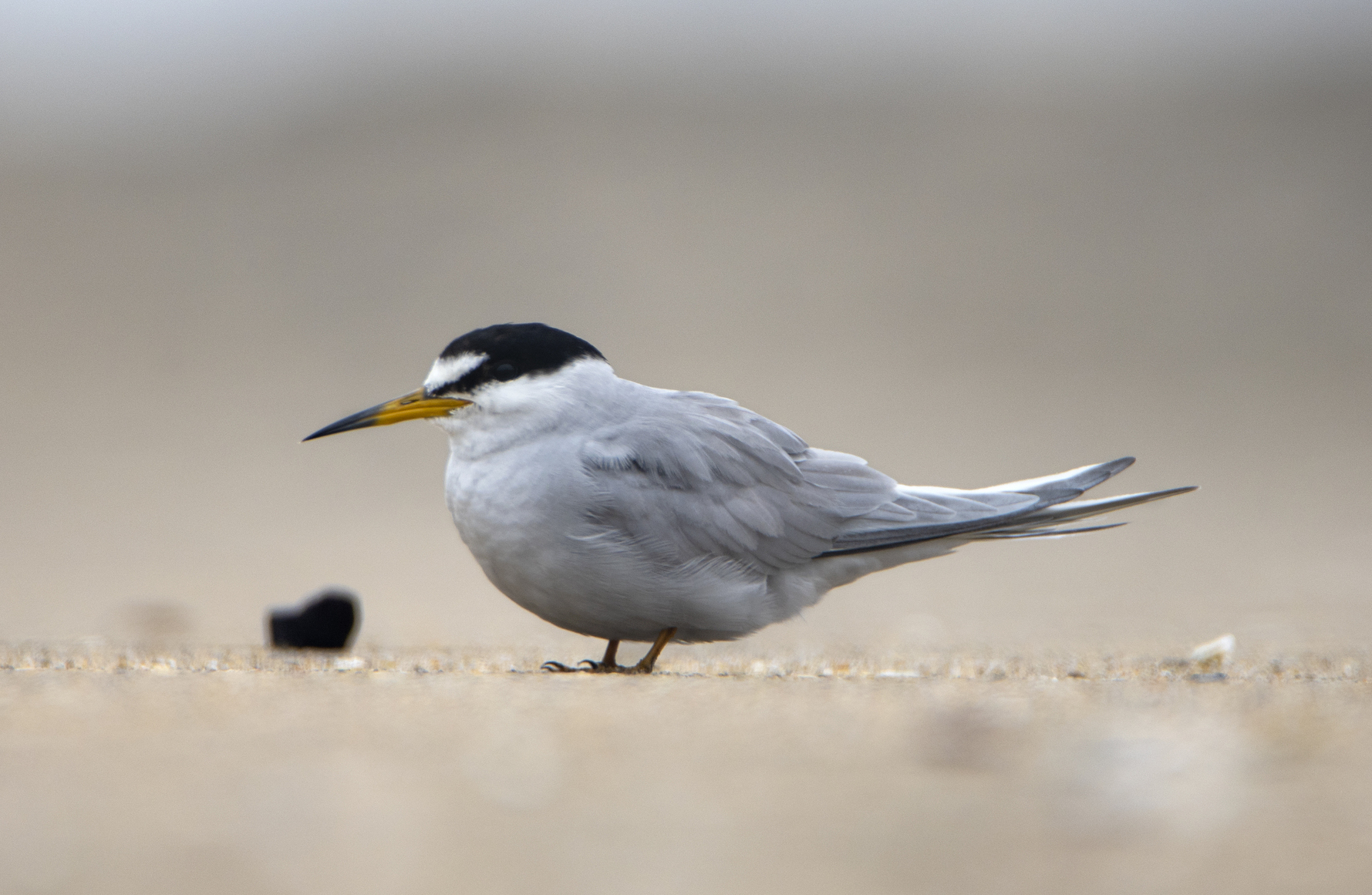

Conservation status
- Endangered (IUCN 3.1)

Scientific classification
- Kingdom: Animalia
- Phylum: Chordata
- Class: Aves
- Order: Charadriiformes
- Family: Laridae
- Genus: Sternula
- Species: S. lorata

Binomial name
- Sternula lorata (Philippi & Landbeck, 1861)

Synonyms
- Sterna lorata Philippi & Landbeck, 1861

= Peruvian tern =

Species of bird

The Peruvian tern (Sternula lorata) is a species of tern in the family Laridae. Found in northern Chile, Ecuador, and Peru, its natural habitats are hot deserts, sandy shores, and coastal saline lagoons. It is threatened by habitat loss.

In Spanish, it is known as the "charrancito Peruano" or "gaviotín chico".

== Description ==
The Peruvian tern is a very small species with a length of about 24 cm (9.4 in). The upper half of the head and neck are black, and the remaining part of the head is white. The back, wings and tail are grey, the throat, chin and breast are white, and the chest, belly and flanks are pale grey. The under tail-coverts are white. The bill is yellow with a black tip, the irises are brown and the legs are yellowish. The pale grey underparts differentiate it from other small terns. It has a very rapid and characteristic wingbeat. The call is a shrill "kik" and a harsh "gree", and it also utters a descending series of "kee-ee-eer" notes.

== Distribution ==
This species is endemic to the tropical west coast of South America. Its range extends from north and central Ecuador, through Peru to northern Chile, as far south as the Mejillones Peninsula. Its status in Ecuador is unclear and in Peru it is known from four confirmed sites, breeding at the back of the beach in association with wetlands. There are nine known sites in Chile, all in the vicinity of Mejillones, and at all of these the birds breed a little inland in the desert. There may be other breeding sites that have yet to be discovered, and some sites have not been revisited since they were recorded many years ago.

== Ecology ==
The diet has been observed to include the Peruvian anchoveta (Engraulis ringens), the king gar (Scomberesox scombroides), the Peruvian silverside (Odontesthes regia) and the mote sculpin (Normanichthys crockeri).

Breeding takes place between August and February but is mostly concentrated between October and January. The nests are widely separated in loose colonies of up to twenty-five pairs. They are often found near coastal wetlands and lagoons where the birds forage. Some birds nest on beaches and dunes one to two hundred metres inland from the high tide mark, but others nest one or more kilometres inland on sandy plains. One or two eggs form a clutch, and both eggs and chicks are well-camouflaged to avoid detection. After breeding, the birds leave the coast and may move out to sea. In El Niño years, they are also absent from the shore, do not make any attempt to breed and probably remain at sea.

== Status ==
The total number of Peruvian terns is estimated to be in the range 1,000 to 2,499 individuals. The number seems to be declining, and in 2007 it was suggested that there were only half as many birds as there had been ten years earlier. Because of the small population size and the decrease in numbers of individuals, BirdLife International has assessed the bird's conservation status as being "endangered". The Chilean Ornithologist Jürgen Rottmann is the director of The Gaviotín Chico Sustainability Foundation which has successfully rallied the local community school students, councilmen and the mining industry, to protect the nesting habitad of this bird at the Mejillones Peninsula from stray dogs and other predators that exacerbate human-caused decline. The strategies used include labeling and fencing of the nesting sites, translocation of predators and the use of decoy Japanese quail eggs.
