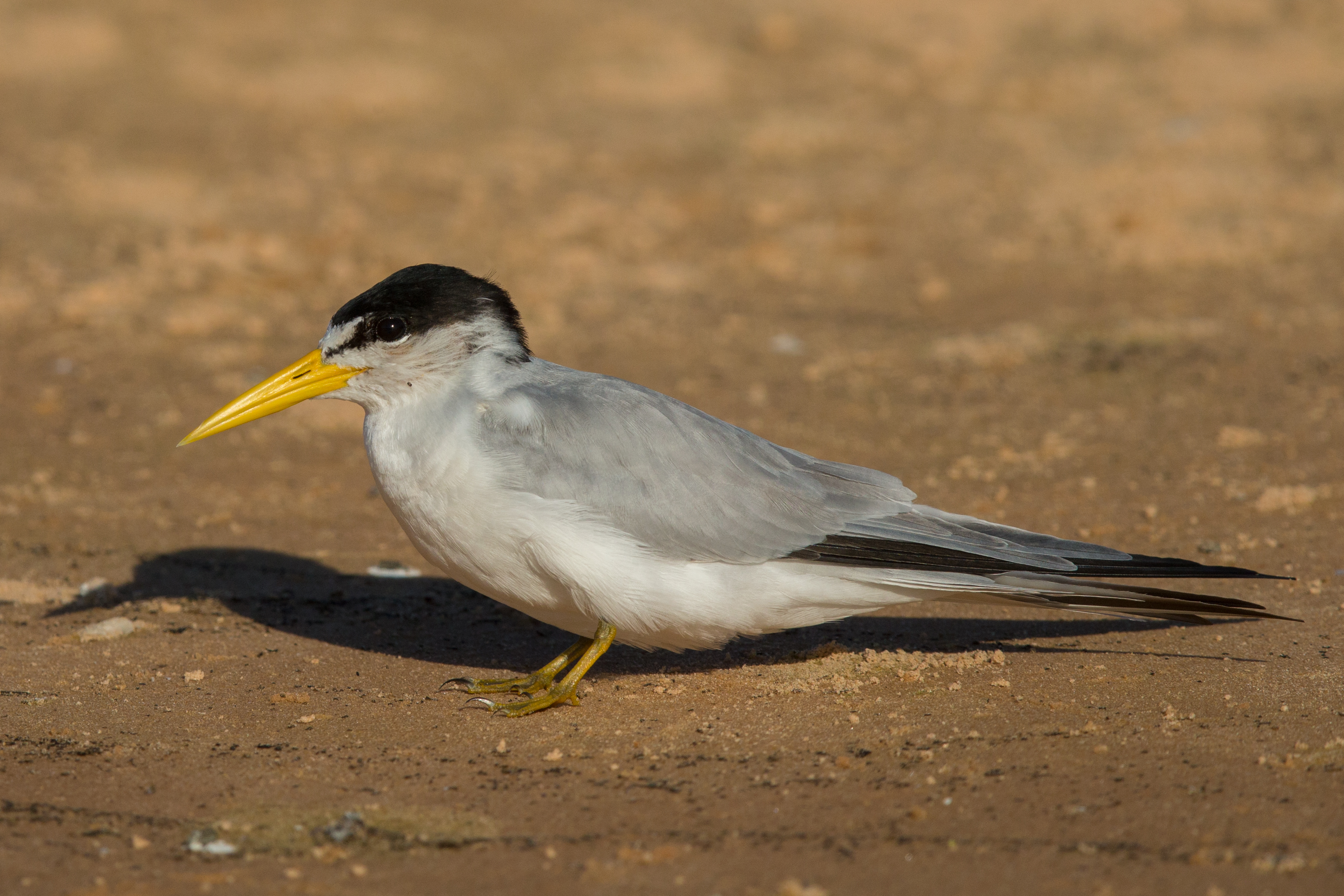

Conservation status
- Least Concern (IUCN 3.1)

Scientific classification
- Kingdom: Animalia
- Phylum: Chordata
- Class: Aves
- Order: Charadriiformes
- Family: Laridae
- Genus: Sternula
- Species: S. superciliaris

Binomial name
- Sternula superciliaris (Vieillot, 1819)

Synonyms
- Sterna superciliaris

= Yellow-billed tern =

Species of bird

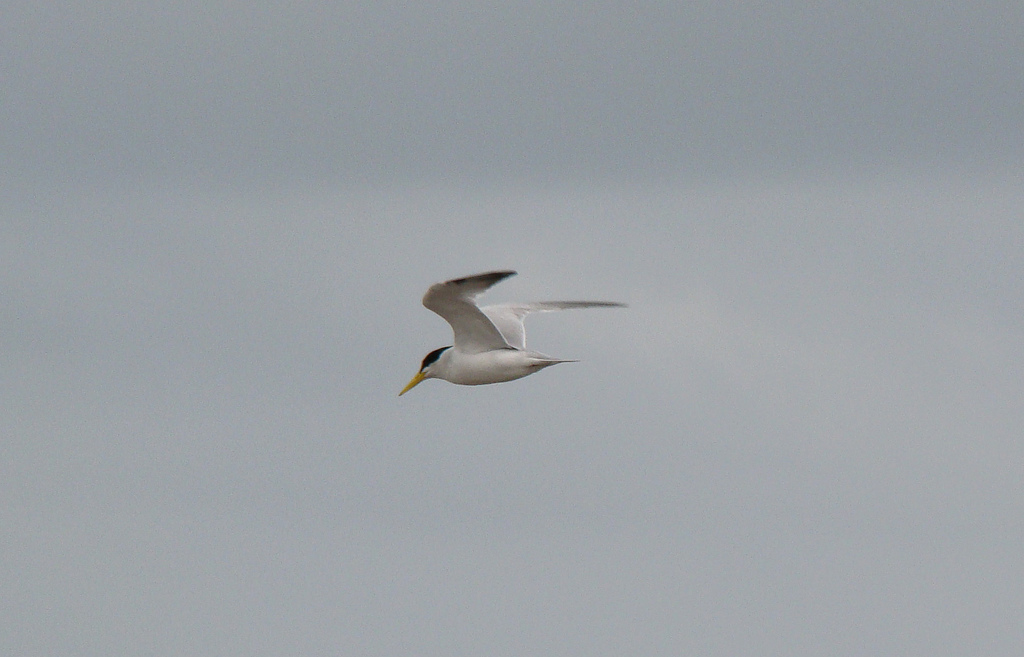

The yellow-billed tern (Sternula superciliaris) is a small seabird found in South America. It is a species of tern in the family Laridae. It is found in Argentina, Bolivia, Brazil, Colombia, Ecuador, French Guiana, Guyana, Panama, Paraguay, Peru, Suriname, Trinidad and Tobago, Uruguay, and Venezuela. Its natural habitats are rivers, swamps, and freshwater lakes.

== Description ==
It measures approximately 23–25 centimeters in body length and weighs 40–57 grams. It has a yellow beak and feet, silvery grey wings and white underbody and forehead. Its crown, nape, and eyeline are black. Juveniles are brown and white without the black cap.

== Nesting ==
It frequently nests alongside colonies of the large-billed tern (Phaetusa simplex) and the black skimmer (Rynchops niger). The yellow-billed tern breeds from August to December on sand banks and island beaches. Non-breeding season habitats include coastal lagoons, river mouths, and rice fields. Their nests consist of shallow scrapes in the sand. Most commonly a clutch contains 2 eggs, but the yellow-billed tern can lay anywhere between 1–4 eggs. The incubation period is approximately 24 days. Nests are usually formed very close to each other. Terns aggressively defend their nests from predators, and other species such as the sand-colored nighthawk (Chordeiles rupestris) have been known to nest among tern colonies to take advantage of this anti-predator behavior.

== Feeding ==
The yellow-billed tern forages during the day, mostly on small fish, shrimp, and insects. It feeds by hovering and picking fish from surface waters.

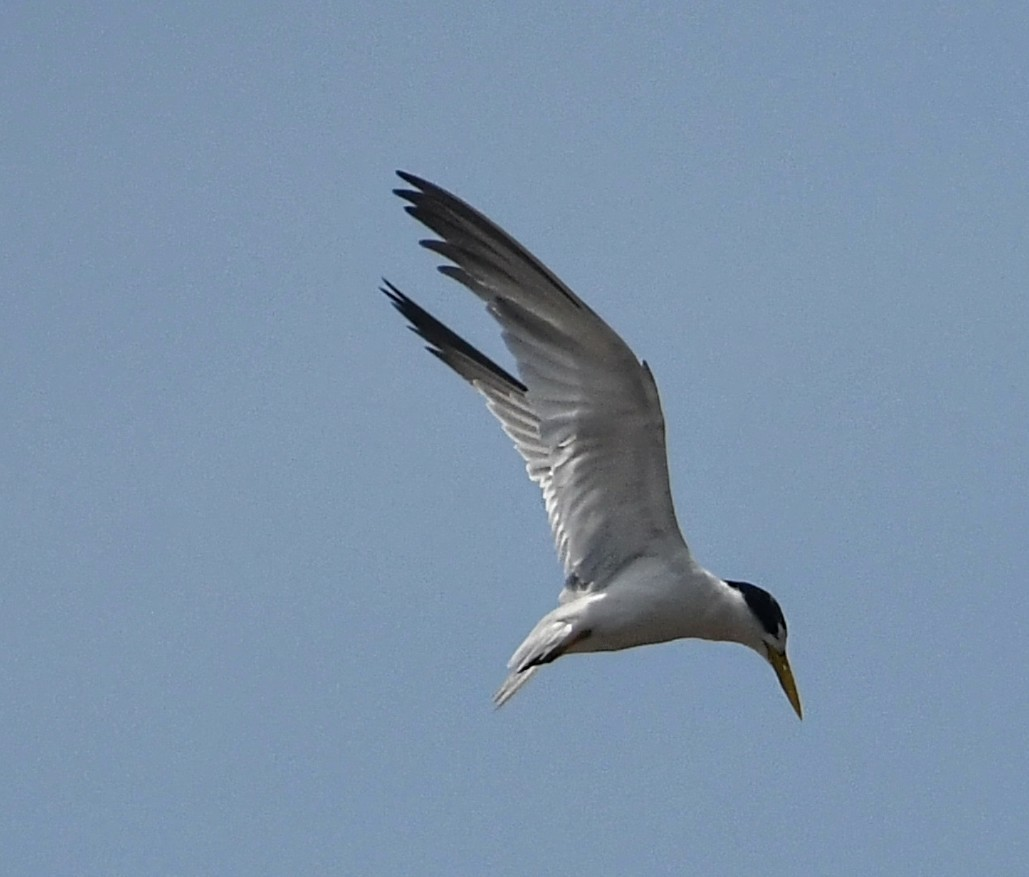
Sternula superciliaris hovering while foraging over the Amazon River near Puerto Nariño, Colombia
