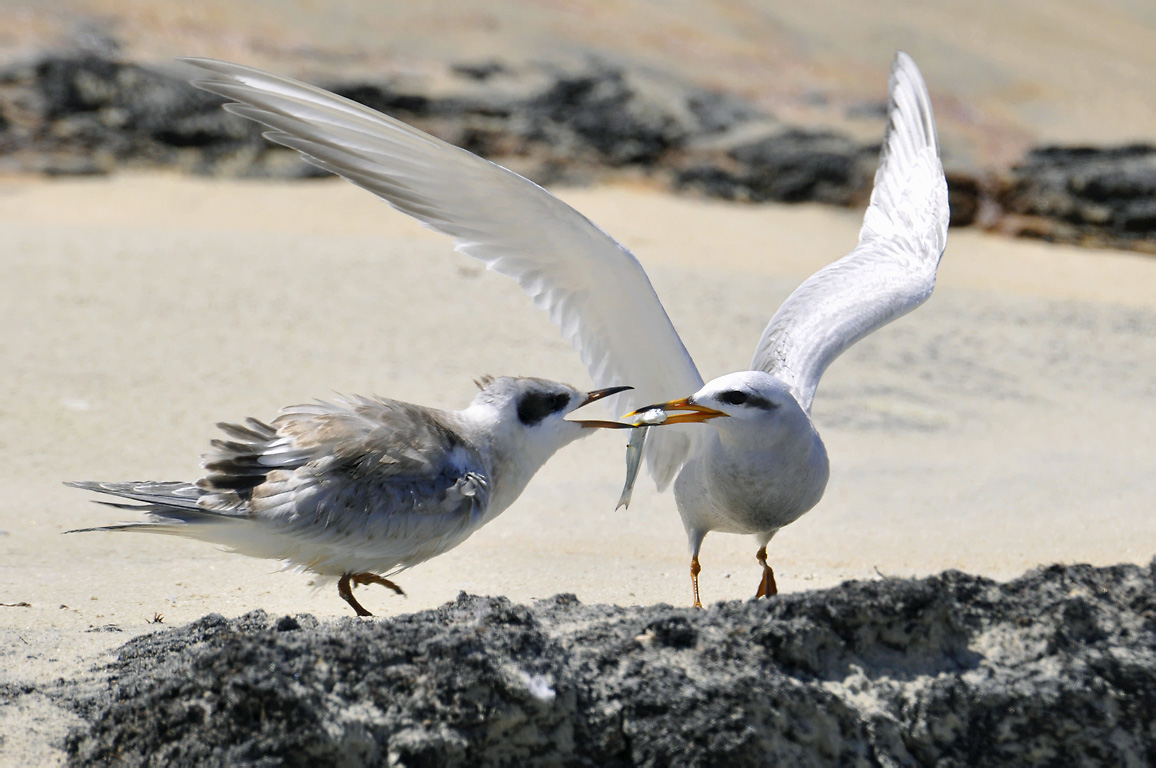
- Adult feeding a juvenile in Rio Grande do Sul, Brazil

Conservation status
- Least Concern (IUCN 3.1)

Scientific classification
- Kingdom: Animalia
- Phylum: Chordata
- Class: Aves
- Order: Charadriiformes
- Family: Laridae
- Genus: Sterna
- Species: S. trudeaui

Binomial name
- Sterna trudeaui Audubon, 1838

= Snowy-crowned tern =

Species of bird

The snowy-crowned tern (Sterna trudeaui), also known as Trudeau's tern, is a species of bird in subfamily Sterninae of the family Laridae, the gulls, terns, and skimmers. It is native to Argentina, Brazil, Chile, Uruguay, and possibly Paraguay, and also vagrant in Peru and the Falkland Islands.

== Taxonomy and systematics ==
Some genetic data indicate that the snowy-crowned tern and several other closely related terns belong in a genus separate from Sterna. At the least, the snowy-crowned and Forster's tern (S. forsteri) are sister species. The snowy-crowned tern is monotypic.

The snowy-crowned tern was first described by the American ornithologist John James Audubon in 1838. He had been sent a specimen by his friend Dr. James de Berty Trudeau (1817–1887) of Louisiana, who had reportedly found several of the terns at Great Egg Harbor Bay, New Jersey. Audubon named the bird in his honor.

== Description ==
The snowy-crowned tern is 28 to 35 cm (11 to 14 in) long with a wingspan of 76 to 78 cm (30 to 31 in) and weighs 146 to 160 g (5.1 to 5.6 oz). It has a rather blocky head, a thick neck, long wings, and a forked tail. The sexes have the same plumage. Adults in breeding plumage have a white head and neck with a black band through the eye. Their upperparts are pale gray with a whitish rump and uppertail coverts. Their underparts are grayish white. Their upperwing is pale gray with silvery primaries and the underwing is white. Their iris is brown and their bill orange with a yellow tip and a black band separating the colors. Their legs and feet are reddish orange. Non-breeding adults are similar to breeding ones, but with a grayer stripe on the face, more intense silvery on the primaries, and a black bill with a yellowish tip. Juveniles have a black and white pattern on their back, a black band near the end of the tail, a black bill, and dark legs.

== Distribution and habitat ==
The snowy-crowned tern breeds from southeastern Brazil south through Uruguay to Argentina's Buenos Aires Province and also in Chile between the provinces of Aconcagua and Llanquihue. Outside the breeding season it ranges along the Atlantic coast as far north as the Rio de Janeiro area and on the Pacific coast as far north as the Department of Ica in Peru. It has appeared as a vagrant as far south as the Straits of Magellan and on the Falkland Islands. Undocumented sight records in Paraguay lead the South American Classification Committee of the American Ornithological Society to treat it as hypothetical in that country. The purported type locality of New Jersey is not supported by any documented North American records.

The snowy-crowned tern inhabits coastal and inland wetlands both fresh and saline, though it favors freshwater landscapes. It mostly breeds on lagoons in the Pampas and Patagonia but also on islands in coastal lagoons.

== Behavior ==
=== Feeding ===
The snowy-crowned tern feeds mostly on fish but also on insects. It forages over shallow water along the edges of wetlands, rivers, and lagoons and over plowed fields. It takes fish by plunge-diving.

=== Breeding ===
The snowy-crowned tern's breeding biology is not fully understood. Its breeding season appears to include October to December. It nests in colonies, often sharing areas with brown-hooded gulls (Chroicocephalus maculipennis). It builds a floating platform nest in shallow water, either free-floating or anchored to emergent vegetation. Both sexes vigorously defend the nest. The clutch size is two to four eggs, but usually three. The incubation period, time to fledging, and details of parental care are not known.

=== Vocalization ===
The snowy-crowned tern's call is "a series of rapid notes "je-je-je-je", or a short, grating "jeeer"."

== Status ==
The IUCN has assessed the snowy-crowned tern as being of Least Concern. It has a fairly large range. Its population is estimated at below 6700 mature individuals and is believed to be stable. "The species only nests in large wetlands, suggesting habitat loss, especially through abstraction of surface water for agricultural use, may be a potentially serious problem."
