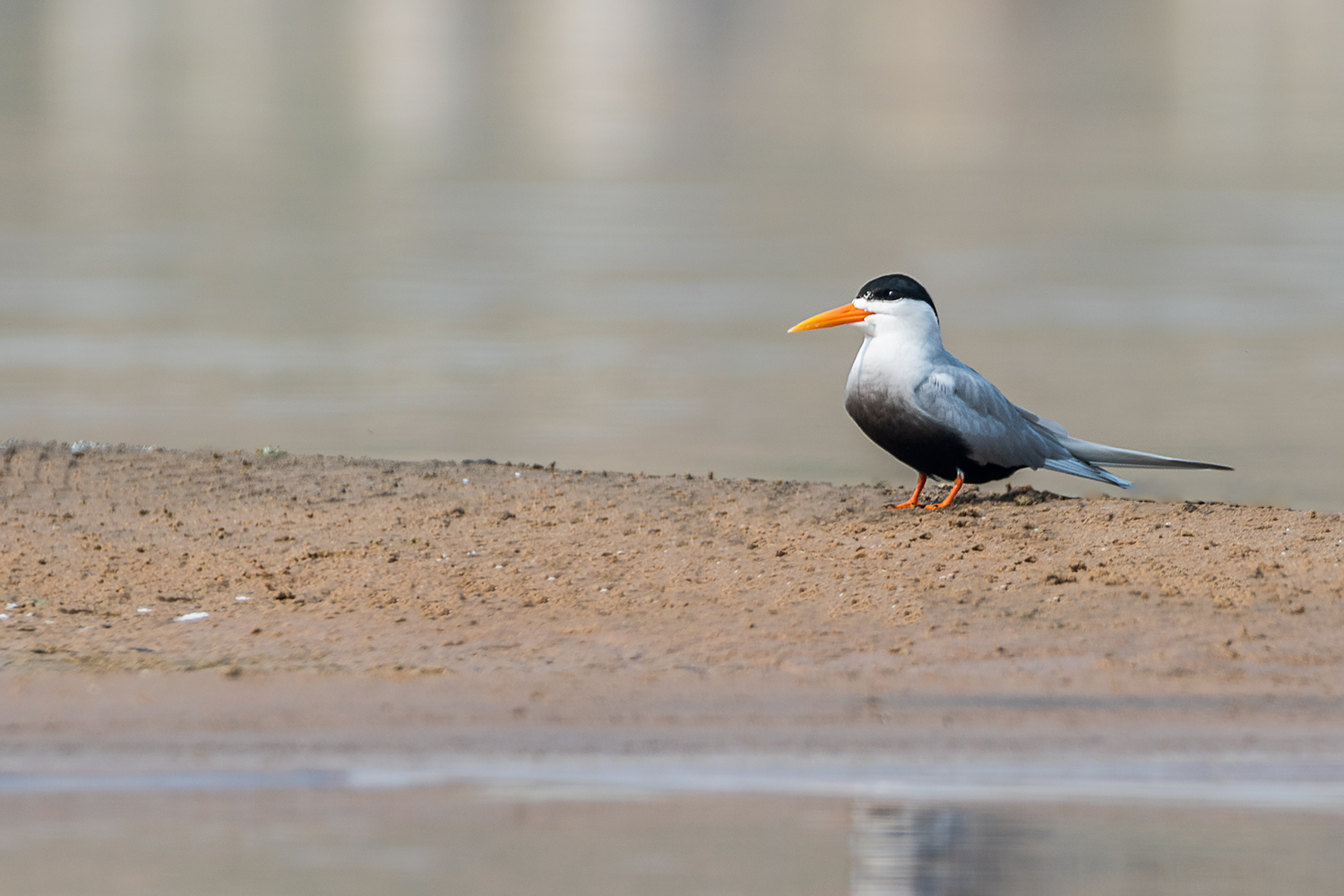

Conservation status
- Endangered (IUCN 3.1)

Scientific classification
- Kingdom: Animalia
- Phylum: Chordata
- Class: Aves
- Order: Charadriiformes
- Family: Laridae
- Genus: Sterna
- Species: S. acuticauda

Binomial name
- Sterna acuticauda Gray, JE, 1831

= Black-bellied tern =

Species of bird

The black-bellied tern (Sterna acuticauda) is a tern found near large rivers in the Indian subcontinent, its range extending from Pakistan, Nepal and India to Myanmar. It has become very scarce in the eastern part of its range and the International Union for Conservation of Nature has assessed its conservation status as being endangered.

They have a black belly in the summer and a deep forked tail. They can sometimes resemble whiskered terns (Chlidonias hybrida), but the deeper fork of the tail and the black on the lower belly distinguish them from the shallow fork and black closer to the breast on the whiskered tern. Considering that sequence analysis supports moving the similar black-fronted tern ("Sterna" albostriata) into Chlidonias, this species might also be better placed in that genus, but no research has yet been conducted.

== Description ==
The black-bellied tern grows to a length of 32 to 35 cm (13 to 14 in). In the breeding plumage, the crown and nape are black and the upper parts are pale grey. The throat is white and the breast pale grey, gradually darkening to a black belly. The wings are long, slender and pointed and the tail is deeply forked with sharply pointed tips. The bill and feet are yellow or orange and the iris is reddish brown. Outside the breeding season, the belly is whitish, the tail is reduced in length and the bill has a dark tip.

== Distribution and habitat ==
The species occurs mostly in Pakistan, Nepal, India and Bangladesh, with a separate range in Myanmar. Its typical habitat is lowland rivers and marshes, and sometimes ditches and pools, at altitudes of up to about 700 m (2,300 ft). It is an entirely inland species and is not found on the coast.

== Ecology ==
The black-bellied tern has long wings but its flight is slow, with much flapping. It feeds on insects and small fish, skimming over the surface of the water and ground to pick up insects, and plunging obliquely into the water to feed on crustaceans, tadpoles and fish. Breeding takes place from February to April, the nesting site usually being a flat sandy location near a river or lake, a sand spit or a sandy island. It does not nest colonially but may nest with other birds such as river terns (Sterna aurantia), pratincoles (Glareola spp.) and Indian skimmers (Rynchops albicollis).

== Status ==
S. acuticauda is classified as being endangered by the International Union for Conservation of Nature. The rationale behind this is that the riparian habitats in which it breeds are under threat in much of southeastern Asia and, although it has an extensive range, it is believed to be extinct in southern China, Nepal, Thailand, Laos, Cambodia and Vietnam. Only in Pakistan, India and Bangladesh are there larger populations, and even in these countries, this bird is thought to be seriously declining. The best estimate of the remaining population, as of 2022, is 900 – 1,100 mature individuals. The threats it faces include the degradation of the islands and sandspits on which it breeds, the collection of eggs for food, predation of eggs and chicks by dogs, cats and crows, flooding of nesting sites by the construction of river dams, competition for fish by local fishermen, entanglement in nets, disturbance, extraction of water, sand and gravel dredging and pollution.
