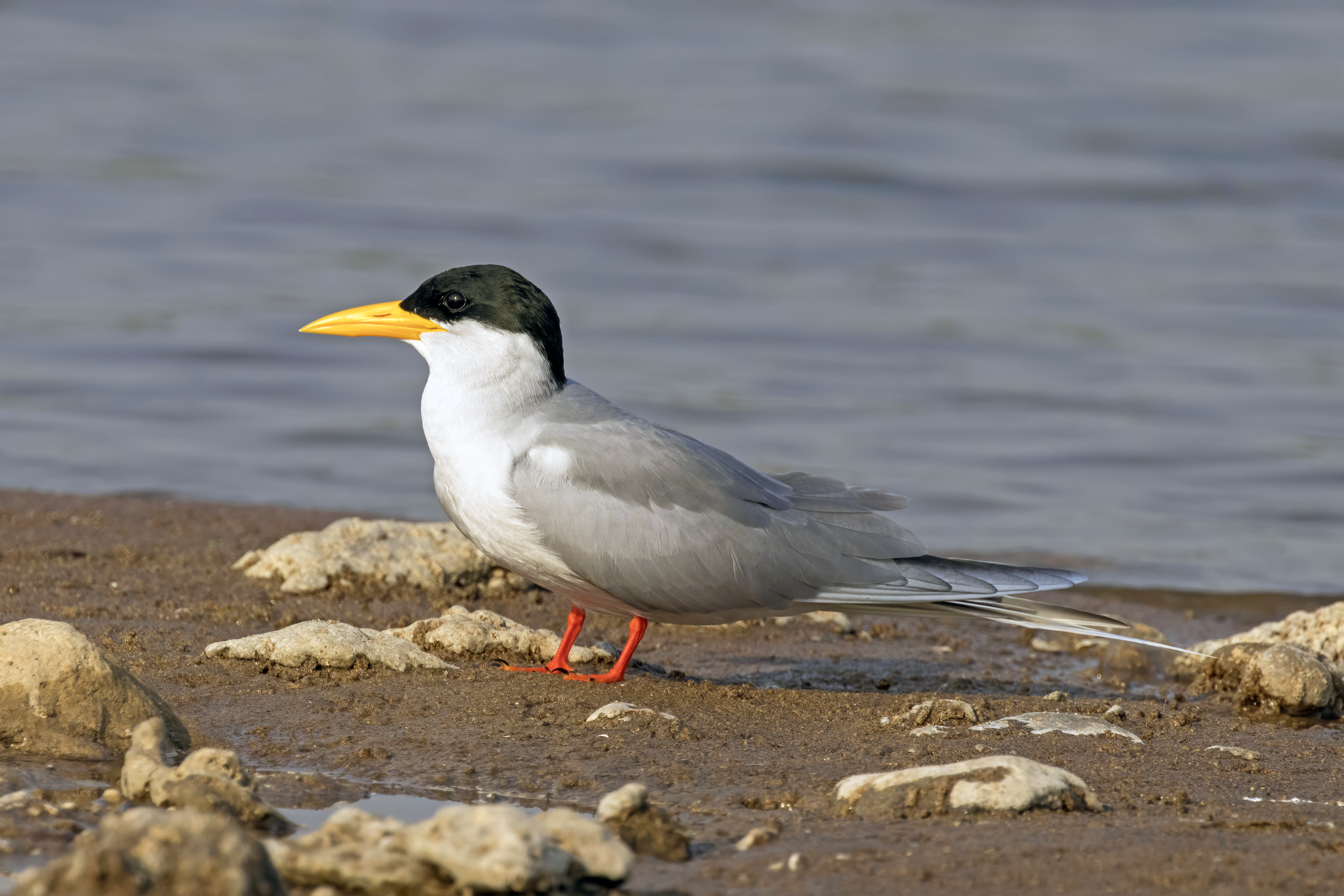
- on the Chambal River, Madhya Pradesh, India

Conservation status
- Vulnerable (IUCN 3.1)

Scientific classification
- Kingdom: Animalia
- Phylum: Chordata
- Class: Aves
- Order: Charadriiformes
- Family: Laridae
- Genus: Sterna
- Species: S. aurantia

Binomial name
- Sterna aurantia Gray, JE, 1831

= River tern =

Species of bird

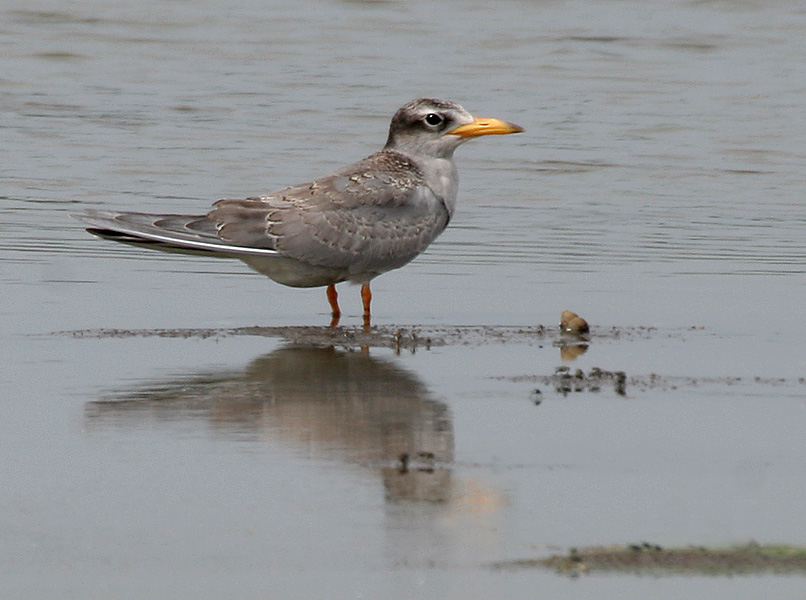
Immature

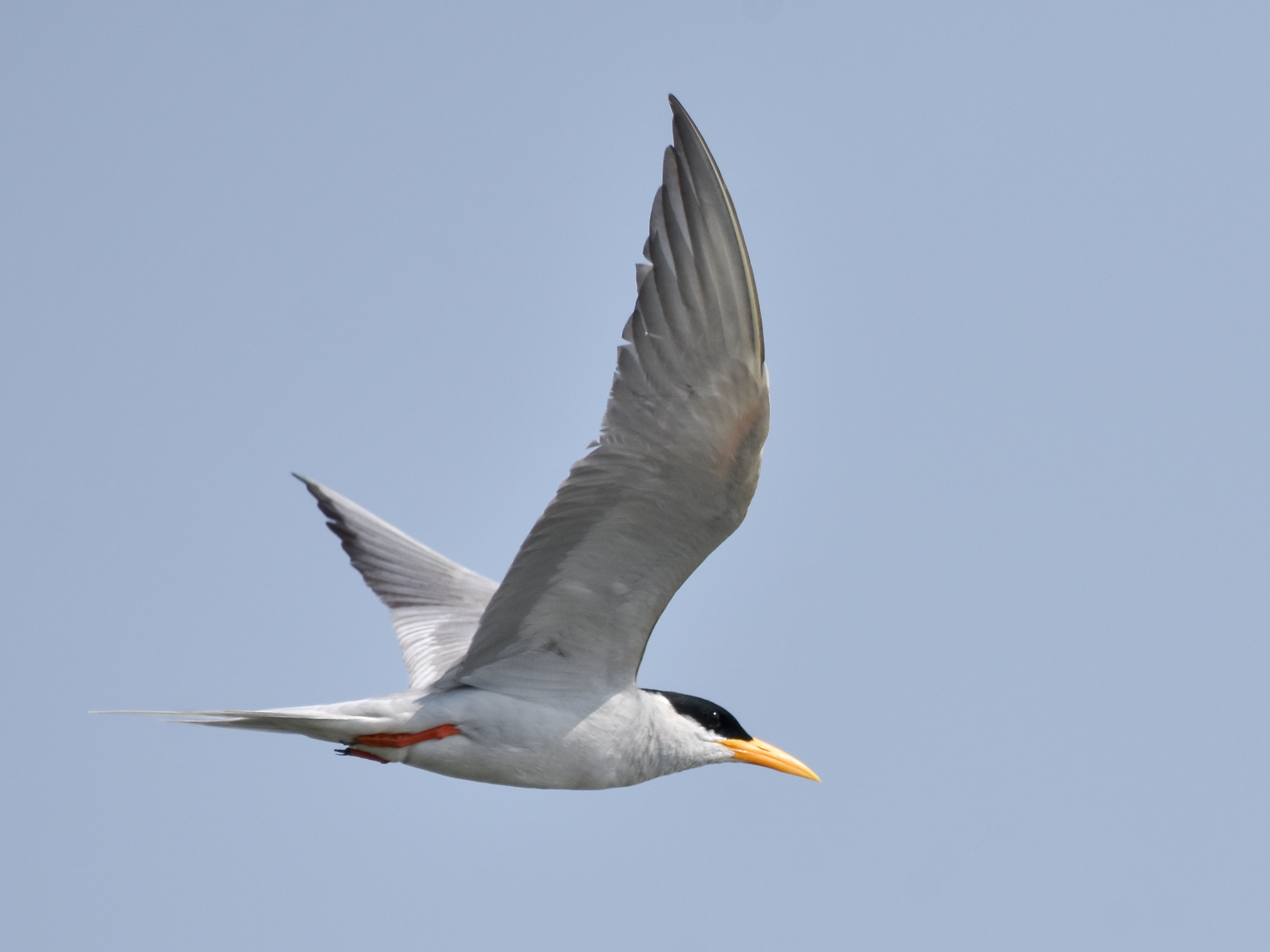
Adult in flight, Kabini, Karnataka

The river tern or Indian river tern (Sterna aurantia) is a tern in the family Laridae, the largest species currently included in the genus Sterna of typical terns. It is a resident breeder along inland rivers from Pakistan east through the Indian subcontinent, to Myanmar, Thailand, and Cambodia, where it is uncommon. Unlike most Sterna terns, it is almost exclusively found on freshwater, rarely venturing even to tidal creeks.

== Description ==
It is a medium-large tern, 38–46 cm long with an 80–85 cm wingspan, distinctly larger than any other species in Sterna and more comparable in size to a Sandwich tern (Thalasseus sandvicensis) or a lesser crested tern (T. bengalensis). It has dark grey upperparts, white or very pale grey underparts, a forked tail with long flexible streamers, and long pointed wings with pale grey primaries. The bill is stout for a tern, bright yellow in summer and duller yellow with a dusky tip in winter, and the legs bright red. It has a black cap in breeding plumage, which is more extensive than in other Sterna terns, extending well below the eye instead of barely or not below the eye. In winter the cap is greyish white, flecked and streaked with black, with a dark mask through the eye; the two longest outer tail feathers are also lost in winter, making it conspicuously shorter-tailed then. The sexes are similar but juveniles have a brown head, brown-marked grey upperparts, grey breast sides and white underparts, and the bill yellowish with a dark tip.

== Taxonomy ==
Its placement in Sterna is uncertain, based only on its appearance and behaviour; it has yet to be tested genetically to determine its closest relatives. In the IOC World Bird List, it is placed as basal in the genus Sterna.

It is monotypic, with no geographical variation.

== Ecology ==
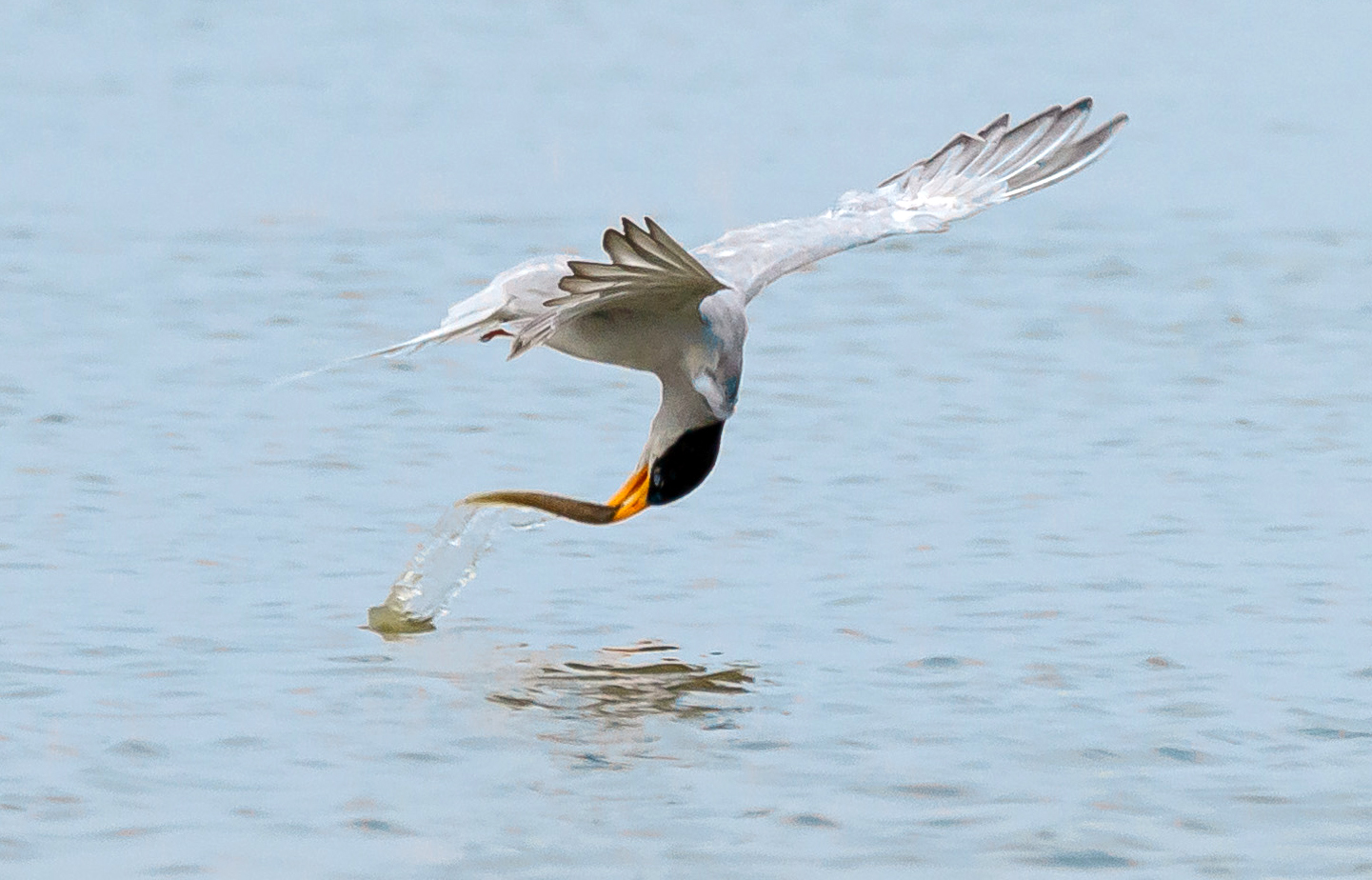
Catching a fish on the wing.

The river tern is typically a lowland riverine freshwater species, mainly occurring from 0–600 m altitude, but exceptionally has been recorded at 2,706 m altitude in the Upper Indus valley in the western Himalaya. It also uses freshwater reservoirs extensively, which has allowed for local increases in population in some areas against the general trend of declines.

Its reluctance to use or cross the sea is shown by the absence of any records from Sri Lanka, despite it being widespread in Kerala and Tamil Nadu in southernmost India.

This species breeds from March to May in colonies in less accessible areas such as sandbanks in rivers. It nests in a ground scrape, often on bare rock or sand, and lays three greenish-grey to buff eggs, which are blotched and streaked with brown.

As with other Sterna terns, the river tern feeds by plunge-diving for fish, crustaceans, tadpoles and aquatic insects in rivers, lakes, and tanks. Its numbers are decreasing due to commercial development of rivers, human disturbance, and pollution of their habitat. It is particularly endangered in the east of its range in the far south of China, where only one breeding site remains, and in Cambodia, Laos and Thailand.

It has been recorded as a vagrant in Afghanistan and Iran.
