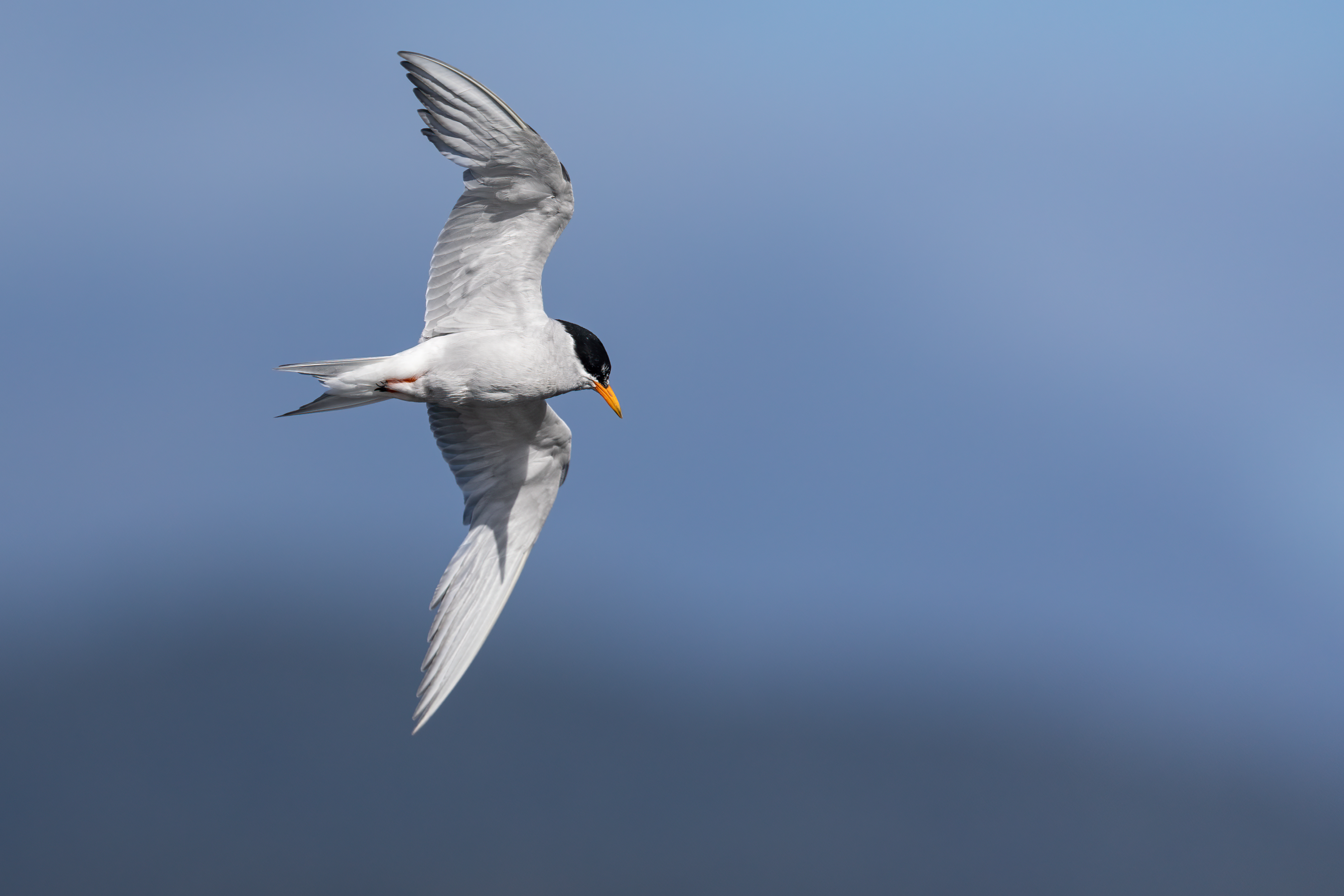

Conservation status
- Endangered (IUCN 3.1)

Scientific classification
- Kingdom: Animalia
- Phylum: Chordata
- Class: Aves
- Order: Charadriiformes
- Family: Laridae
- Genus: Chlidonias
- Species: C. albostriatus

Binomial name
- Chlidonias albostriatus (Gray, 1845)
- Native range of the black-fronted tern on the map of New Zealand: Breeding range Wintering range Passage

Synonyms
- Sterna albostriata

= Black-fronted tern =

Species of bird

The black-fronted tern (Chlidonias albostriatus), sea martin, ploughboy, or tarapiroe (Māori), is a medium-small tern endemic to New Zealand. Black-fronted terns can be found in coastal habitats from the southern tip of the North Island to the eastern South Island as well as Stewart Island. Their breeding range is restricted to the South Island, where they will form breeding colonies on braided river islands.

The species is globally and nationally endangered, due to its small and declining national population. Black-fronted terns are vulnerable to a range of threats, including predation by introduced mammals, habitat loss (land use changes and weed encroachment), resource abstraction (gravel and water), human disturbance, and climate change.

== Taxonomy ==
German naturalist Johann Reinhold Forster described the black-fronted tern from a specimen collected at Queen Charlotte Sound, Marlborough in 1832, giving it the binomial name Sterna antarctica, which had already been used for the Antarctic tern by French naturalist René Lesson the previous year.

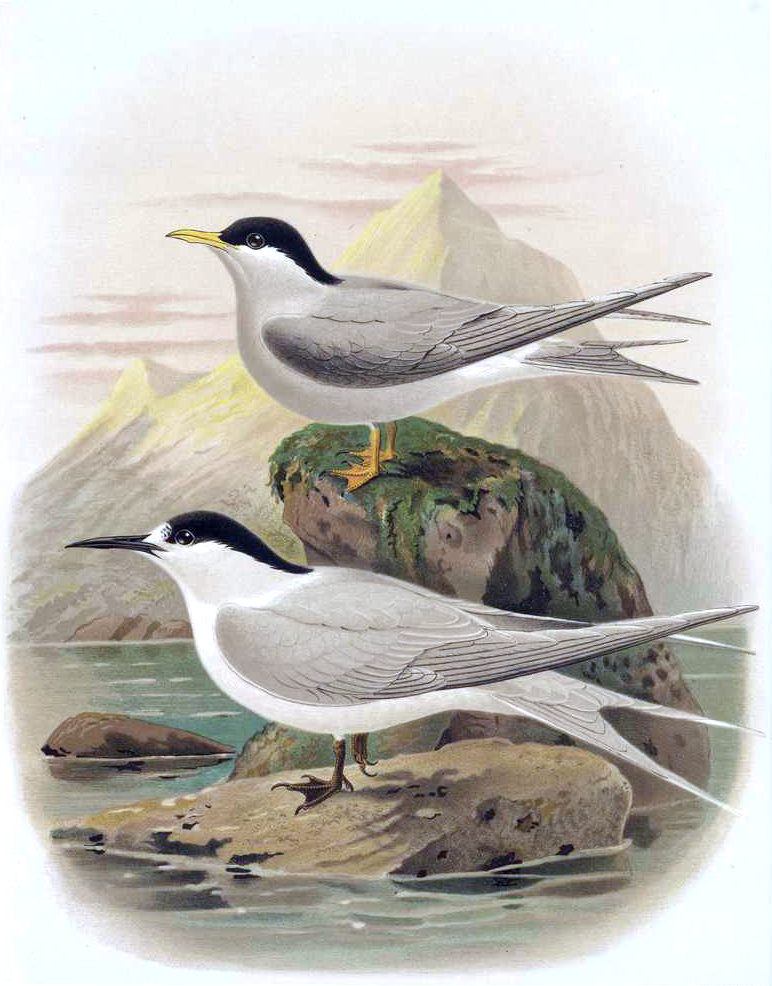
A History of the Birds of New Zealand, Buller, 1888

The first valid description of the species was by George Robert Gray in 1845, when it was described as Hydrochelidon albostriata. Its specific name is derived from the Latin albus "white", and striatus "striped". Charles Lucien Bonaparte spelled the name albistriata in 1856, which was adopted by subsequent authors until it was corrected by Walter Oliver in 1955.

The taxonomic placement was unclear for many years, as the bird's plumage and inland breeding migration suggested it belonged to the marsh tern genus Chlidonias, even though it did not nest in marshes. Martin Moynihan placed the species in the genus Sterna, suspecting that the plumage similarities to C. hybrida and other species of the genus were due to similarities in their environments. A molecular study by Bridge and colleagues in 2005 placed the species as a basal member of Chlidonias .

The species has several vernacular names. In 1845, Gray noted the Māori name tarapiroe. The name ploughboy or ploughman's friend refers to its foraging for earthworms and grubs in freshly turned soil.

== Description ==
Black-fronted terns are considered medium-small in size. Adults measure 28–30 cm in length, with a 65–72 cm wingspan and an average weight of 95 g. They have short orange bills, short orange legs, and a body that is dark grey above and light grey below with a white rump and a distinctive black cap. During the non-breeding season, the black cap recedes and becomes flecked with white.

== Distribution and habitat ==
Within New Zealand, black-fronted terns are found from the southern tip of the North Island, and along much of the eastern South Island from Marlborough to Southland, and to Stewart Island. There is an outlying population along the Buller and upper Motueka Rivers in southern Nelson.

Black-fronted terns frequent coastal areas, including estuaries, harbours, and farmland (up to 3 km or 1.86 mi inland), where they will forage for insects and small fish. They will forage up to 10 km (6.21 mi) out to sea particularly in calm weather.

== Breeding ==
The breeding range is restricted to the eastern South Island. The breeding season for black-fronted terns falls in summer between the months of October and February. During this time, black-fronted terns will migrate inland to semi-permanent islands on braided river systems to form colonies of one to over 79 breeding pairs.

Black-fronted terns, like many other New Zealand bird species, nest on the ground. Black-fronted terns look for unvegetated, rocky, gravel, or sandy islands along braided rivers systems to build their nests. Nests are simple scrapes in the ground, sometimes lined with twigs.

== Ecology and conservation ==
Black-fronted terns are particularly vulnerable to a number of threats including predation by introduced mammals, habitat loss (land use changes and weed encroachment), resource abstraction (gravel and water), human disturbance, and climate change.

Conservation methods involve predator control, habitat enhancement (modification of river islands and weed control), and the use of chick shelters.

=== Predation ===
Black-fronted terns at all stages of life are vulnerable to exotic mammals that have been introduced to New Zealand. Due to the country's long isolation from other land masses, endemic New Zealand species have not evolved alongside mammalian predators and therefore have no effective defences against them. Predation is considered the leading cause of nest failure, though the predators responsible depend on the location of the colony.

The following species have been recorded predating black-fronted tern adults, chicks, and eggs:

- Mustelids (Mustela spp.), including stoats (M. erminea) and weasels (M. nivalis)
- Feral cats (Felis catus). There have been multiple known instances wherein a lone feral cat has depredated a significant number of tern nests in a single visit. For one Rangitata River colony in 2006, 76% of the nests were depredated by a single cat in one night; for a Waiau Toa/Clarence River colony in 2024, 95 nests were either depredated or disturbed by a single cat, resulting in the failure of almost all the nests in the colony.
- Rodents, including the brown rat (Rattus norvegicus) and mouse (Mus musculus)
- European hedgehogs (Erinaceus europaeus occidentalis)
- Australian magpies (Gymnorhina tibicen)

Introduced predators are often controlled by the government, regional councils, and wildlife management groups to protect black-fronted tern colonies and other braided river birds.

Black-fronted terns are also predated by native avian predators, such as the Australasian swamp harrier (Circus approximans), Southern black-backed gull (Larus dominicanus), and South Island pied oystercatchers (Haematopus finschi). The populations of both the Australasian swamp harrier and the Southern black-backed gull have increased since human arrival to New Zealand. Regular population control of the Southern black-backed gull is carried out to safeguard native species, such as black-fronted terns.

== Gallery ==
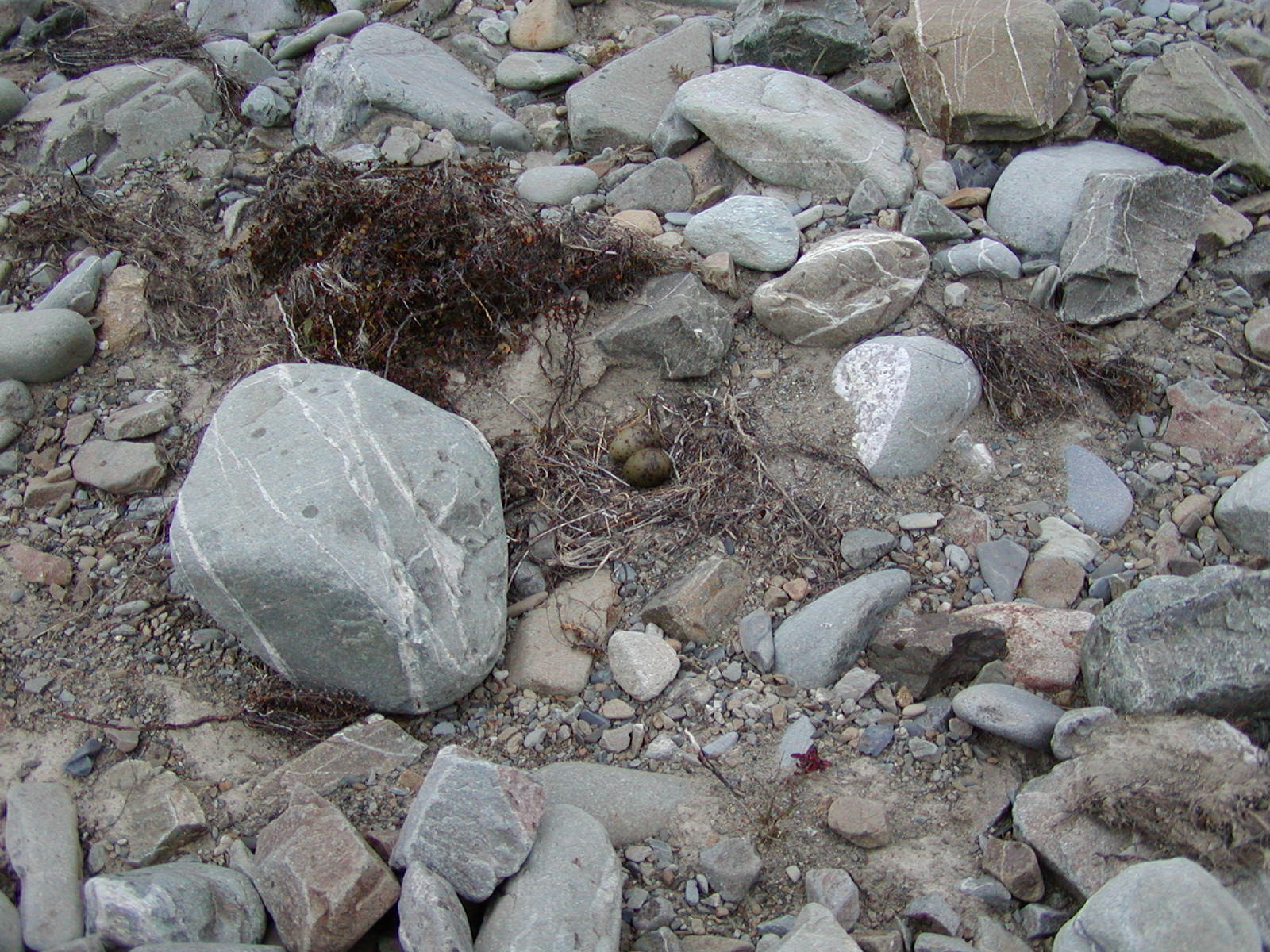
A black-fronted tern nest.

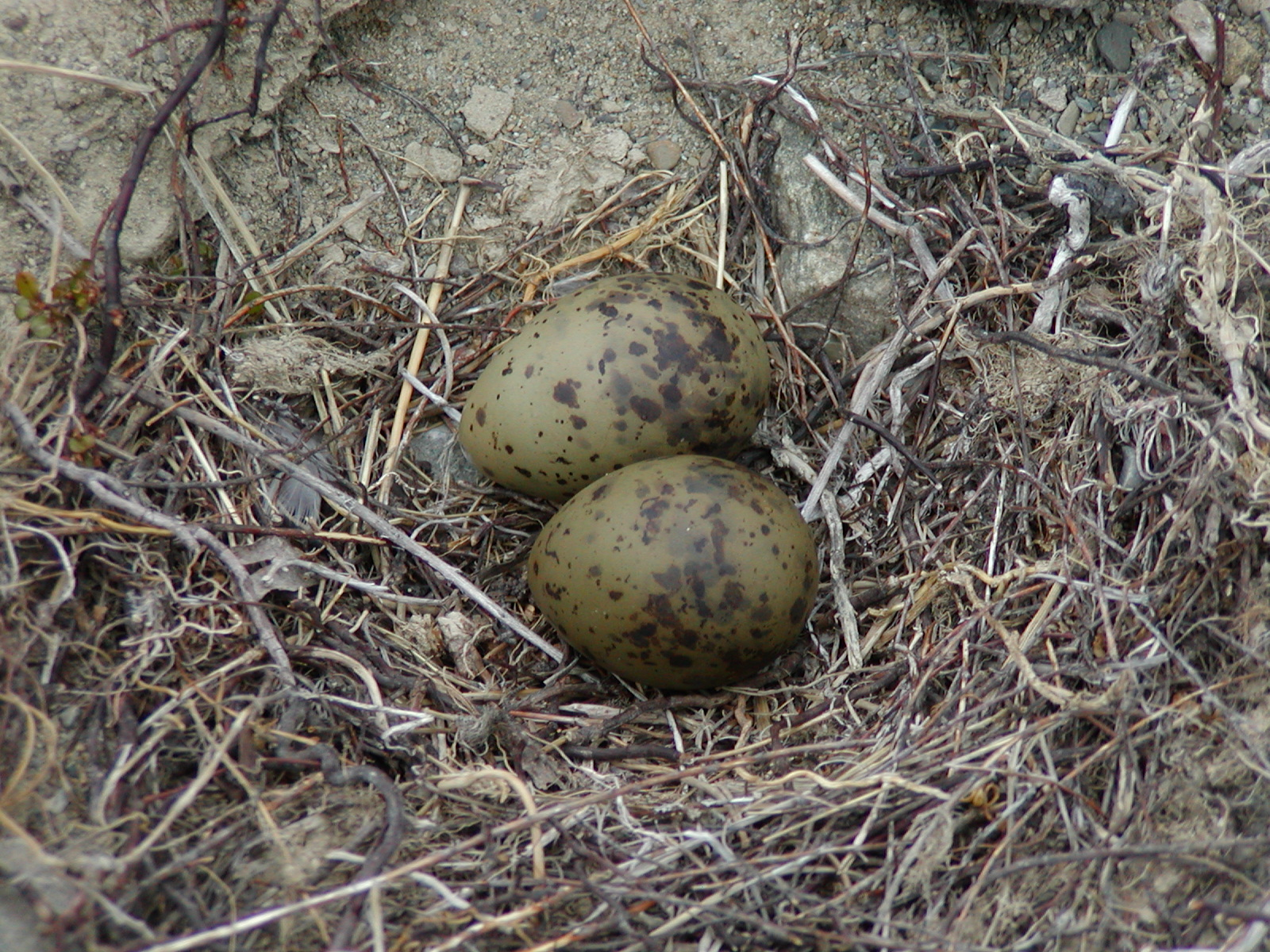
Black-fronted tern eggs.
