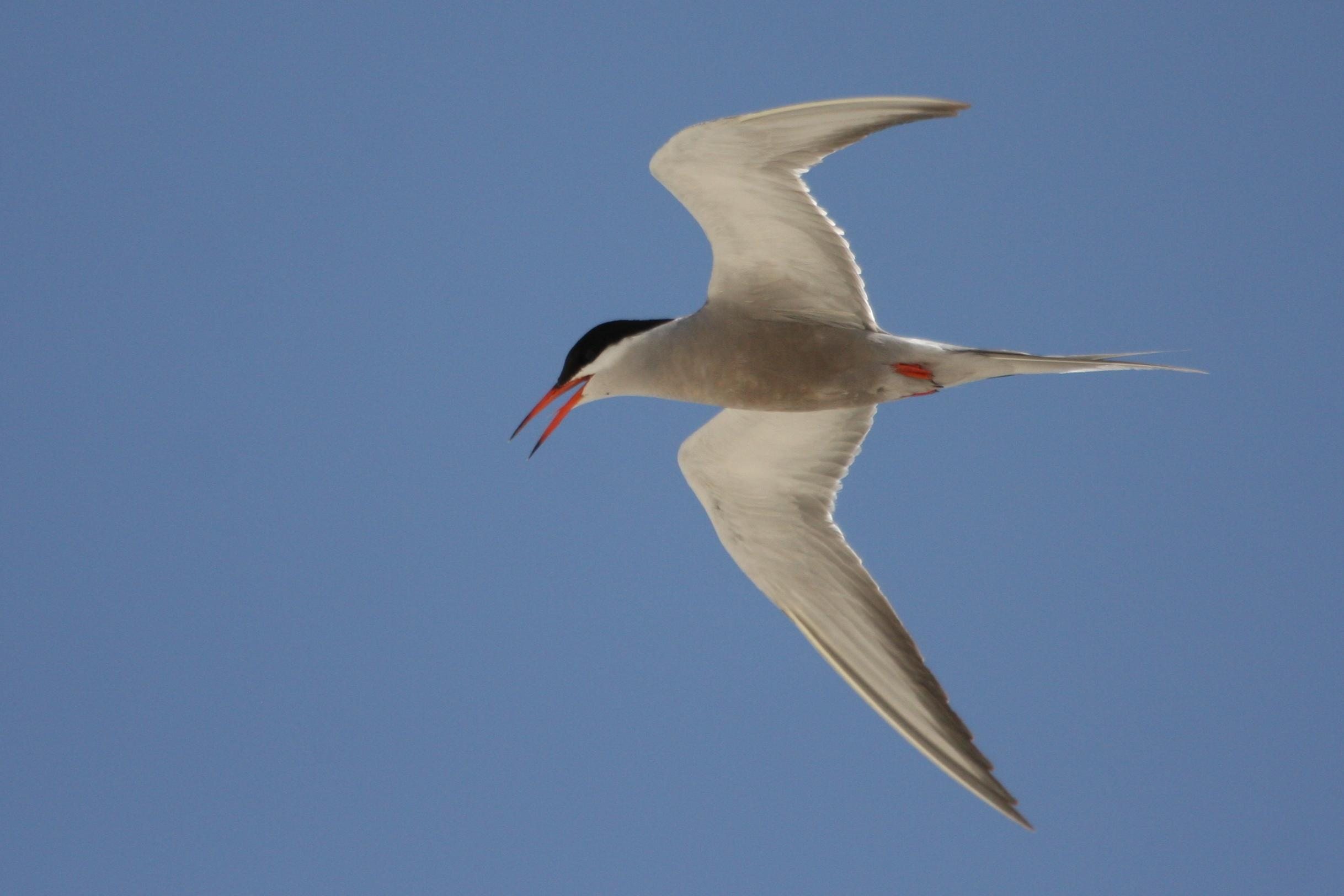

Conservation status
- Least Concern (IUCN 3.1)

Scientific classification
- Kingdom: Animalia
- Phylum: Chordata
- Class: Aves
- Order: Charadriiformes
- Family: Laridae
- Genus: Sterna
- Species: S. repressa

Binomial name
- Sterna repressa Hartert, 1916; Fao, Ottoman Empire

= White-cheeked tern =

Species of bird

The white-cheeked tern (Sterna repressa) is a species of tern in the family Laridae. It is found around the coasts on the Red Sea, around the Horn of Africa to Kenya, in the Persian Gulf and along the Iranian coast to Pakistan and western India.

== Behaviour ==
Most of this species is migratory, although those in East Africa may remain there all year. It breeds in colonies of 10–200 pairs. These colonies can consist of a mixture of tern species.

== Distribution and Status ==
The White-cheeked Tern is distributed along tropical and subtropical coasts of the Red Sea, the Persian Gulf, the Arabian Sea, and the Indian Ocean. It is listed as Least Concern by the IUCN, but regional populations may face specific threats such as predation by invasive species and habitat degradation.

=== Habitat ===
The species inhabits tropical coasts and inshore waters, foraging mainly within 3 kilometres (1.9 mi) of land over coral reefs. Its nest is a shallow scrape on rock, sand, gravel or coral islands, bare and exposed sandflats and sparsely vegetated open ground on sand-dunes and above the high-water mark on beaches.

=== Threats and conservation ===
On Shidvar Island in the Persian Gulf, 17 feral cats were accidentally introduced in 2021 and subsequently removed. The distribution of white-cheeked tern clutch sizes differed significantly between surveys: two-egg clutches predominated before the introduction of cats in 2014 (67.2%) and after their complete removal in 2023 (77.7%), whereas one-egg clutches predominated while three cats remained in 2022 (74.7%). The researchers suggested a possible effect of introduced predators but noted that natural variation between years could not be excluded.

== Diet ==
Its diet consists of invertebrates and small fish.
