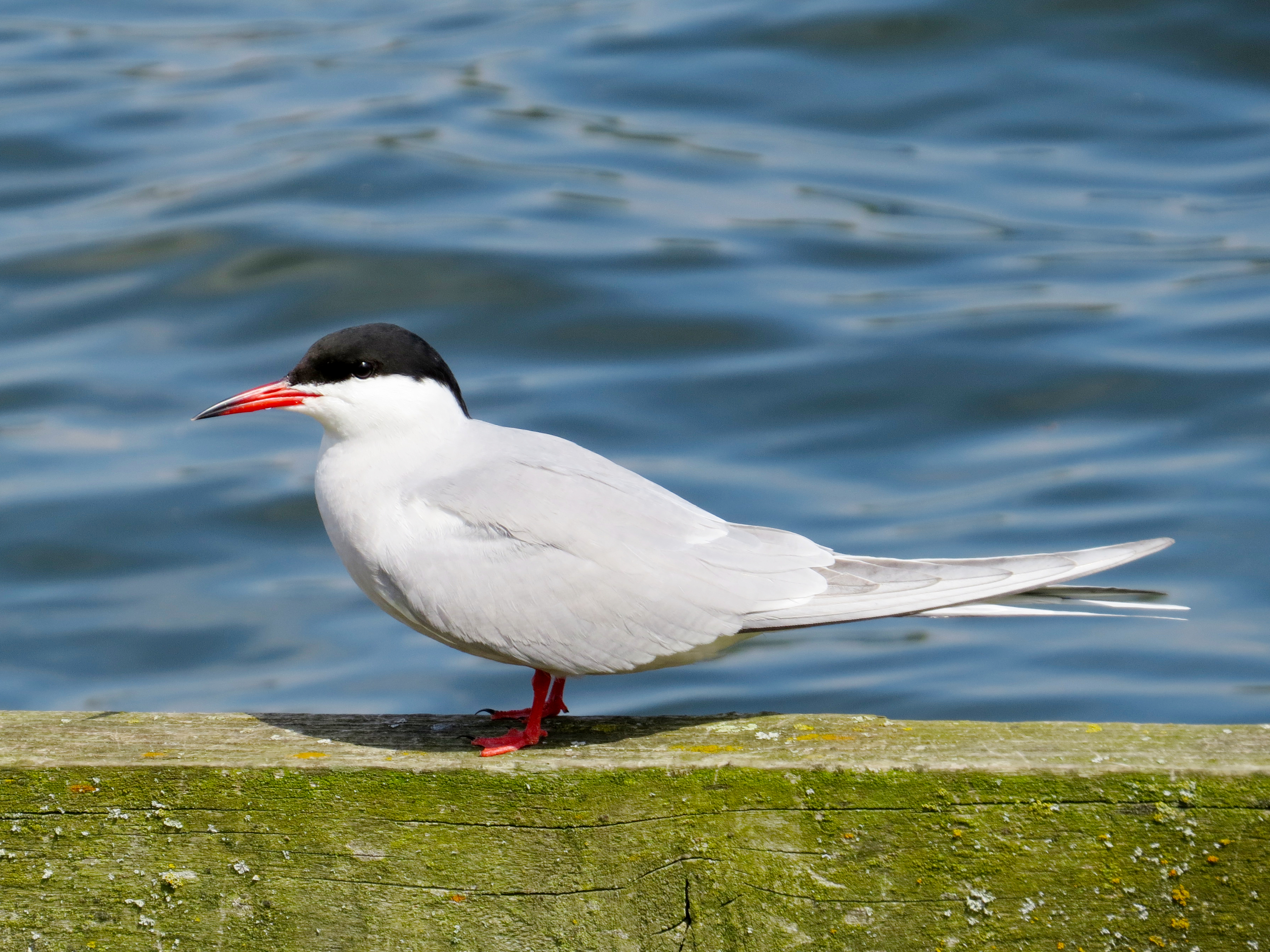
- Sterna hirundo in Northumberland

Scientific classification
- Kingdom: Animalia
- Phylum: Chordata
- Class: Aves
- Order: Charadriiformes
- Family: Laridae
- Tribe: Sternini
- Genus: Sterna; Linnaeus, 1758

Type species
- Sterna hirundo Linnaeus, 1758

Species
- 13, see text

= Sterna =

Genus of birds

Sterna is a genus of terns in the bird family Laridae. The genus used to encompass most "white" terns indiscriminately, but mtDNA sequence comparisons have determined that this arrangement was paraphyletic. It is now restricted to the typical medium-sized white terns with deeply forked tails, which occur near-globally, mostly in coastal regions but several also using freshwater habitats inland.

== Taxonomy ==
The genus Sterna was introduced in 1758 by the Swedish naturalist Carl Linnaeus in the tenth edition of his Systema Naturae. The type species is the common tern (Sterna hirundo). Sterna is derived from Old English "stearn" which appears in the poem The Seafarer; a similar word was used to refer to terns by the Frisians.

=== Species ===
The genus contains 13 species.

Image	Common name	Scientific name	Distribution
	River tern	Sterna aurantia	Inland rivers from Pakistan east through the Indian Subcontinent to Myanmar, Thailand, and Cambodia.
	Forster's tern	Sterna forsteri	North America.
	Snowy-crowned tern or Trudeau's tern	Sterna trudeaui	Argentina, south-east Brazil, Chile, Paraguay and Uruguay.
	Arctic tern	Sterna paradisaea	Arctic and Subarctic regions of Europe, Asia, and North America (as far south as Brittany and Massachusetts).
	South American tern	Sterna hirundinacea	Southern South America, including the Falkland Islands, ranging north to Peru (Pacific coast) and Brazil (Atlantic coast).
	Antarctic tern	Sterna vittata	Uruguay, Argentina, Brazil, Chile, the Falkland Islands, the Heard Island, the McDonald Islands, Australia, and New Zealand.
	Kerguelen tern	Sterna virgata	Kerguelen Islands, the Prince Edward Islands (i.e. Prince Edward and Marion) and Crozet Islands.
	Common tern	Sterna hirundo	Eastern North America, Europe, North Africa, Asia east to Siberia and Kazakhstan.
	White-cheeked tern	Sterna repressa	Coasts on the Red Sea, around the Horn of Africa to Kenya, in the Persian Gulf and along the Iranian coast to Pakistan and western India.
	Black-naped tern	Sterna sumatrana	Tropical and subtropical areas of the Pacific and Indian Oceans.
	Roseate tern	Sterna dougallii	Atlantic coasts of Europe and North America, and winters south to the Caribbean and west Africa; and subspecies from east Africa across the Indian Ocean to Japan, and in Australia and New Caledonia.
	White-fronted tern	Sterna striata	New Zealand and Australia.
	Black-bellied tern	Sterna acuticauda	Pakistan, Nepal, India and Bangladesh, with a separate range in Myanmar.

The following genera were formerly often included in Sterna:

- Onychoprion (larger terns with white foreheads and dark backs)
- Sternula (small terns mostly with white foreheads)
- Thalasseus (large terns with crests)
