= List of Laridae species =

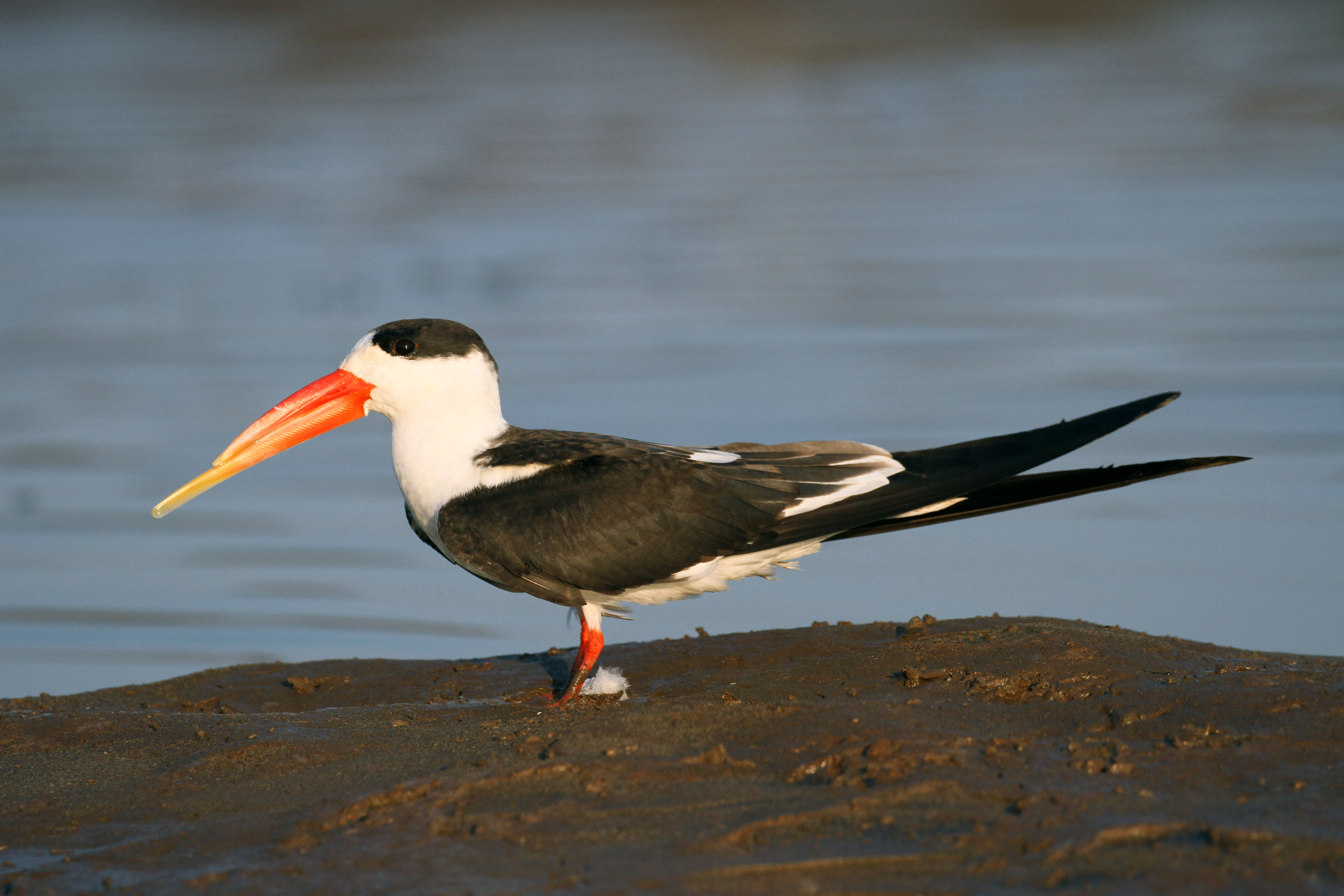
Rynchops albicollis

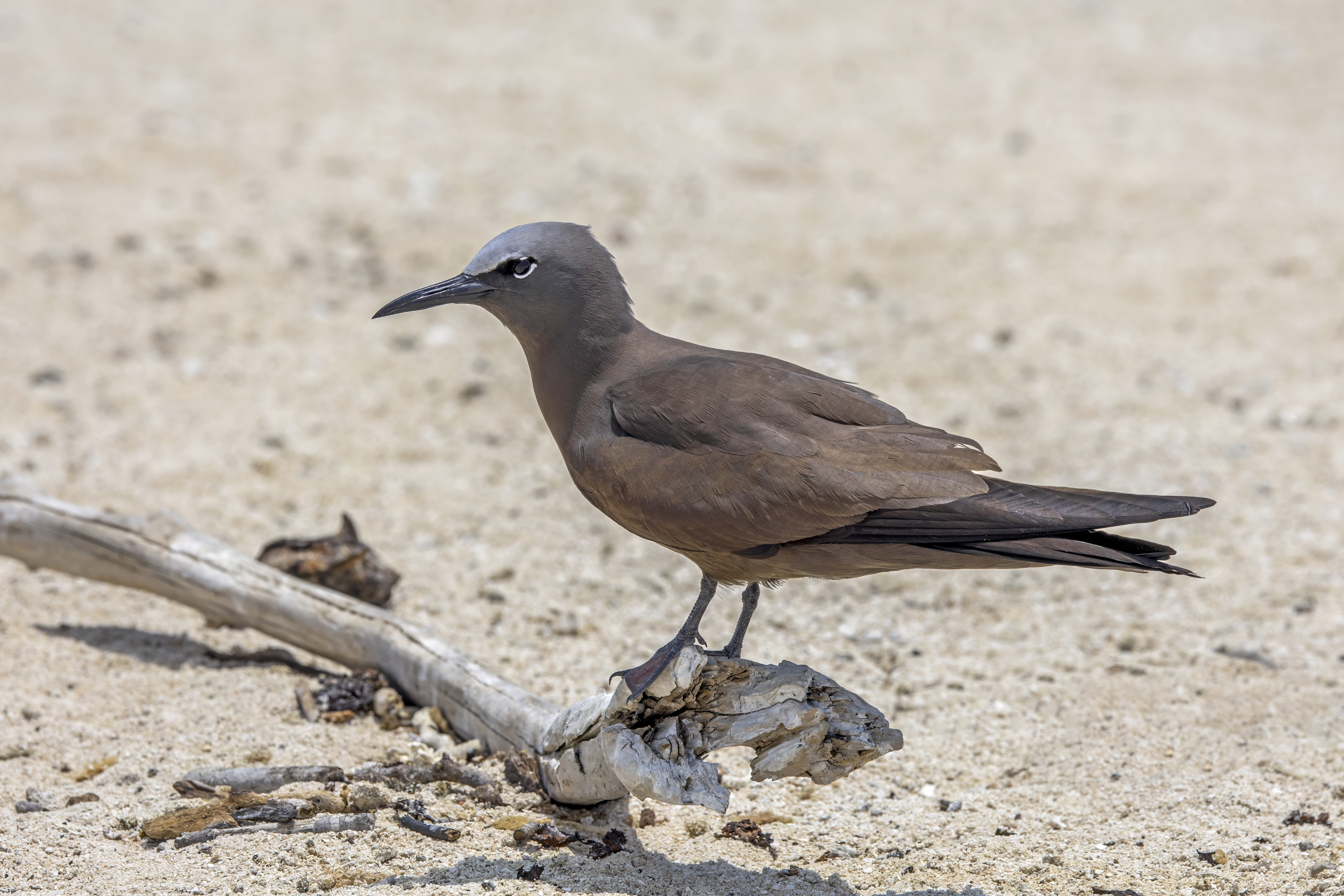
Anous stolidus

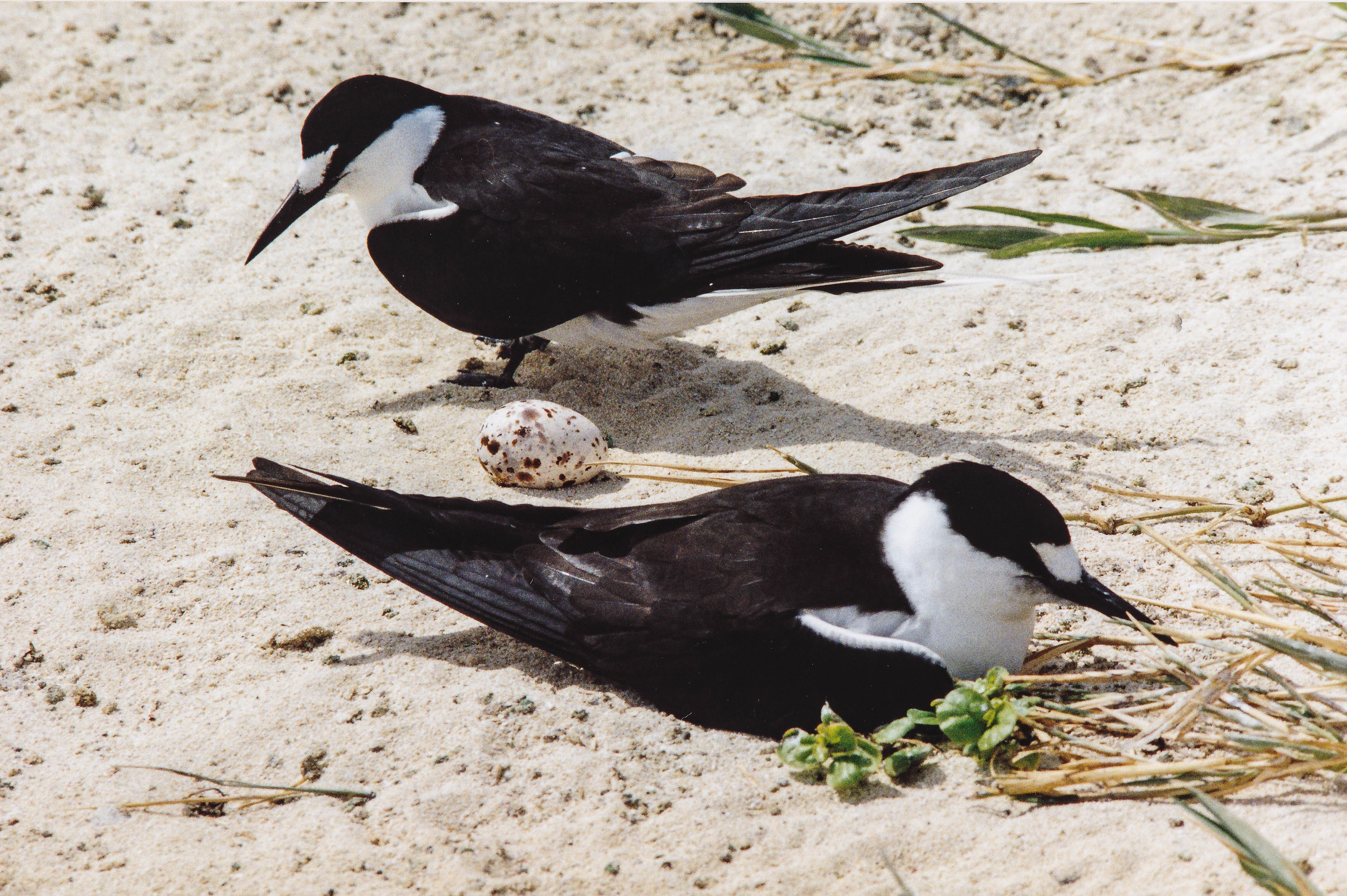
Onychoprion fuscatus

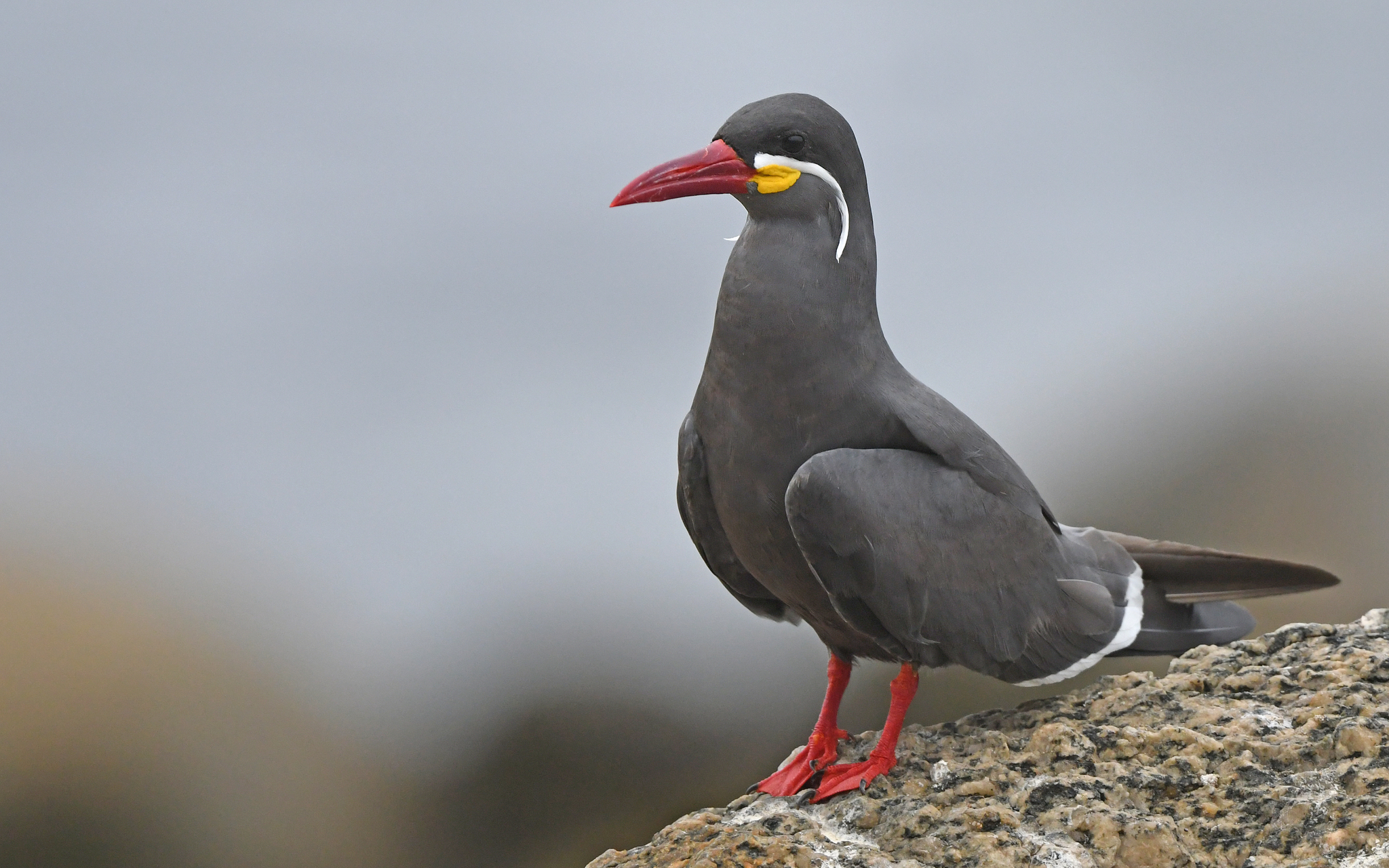
Larosterna inca

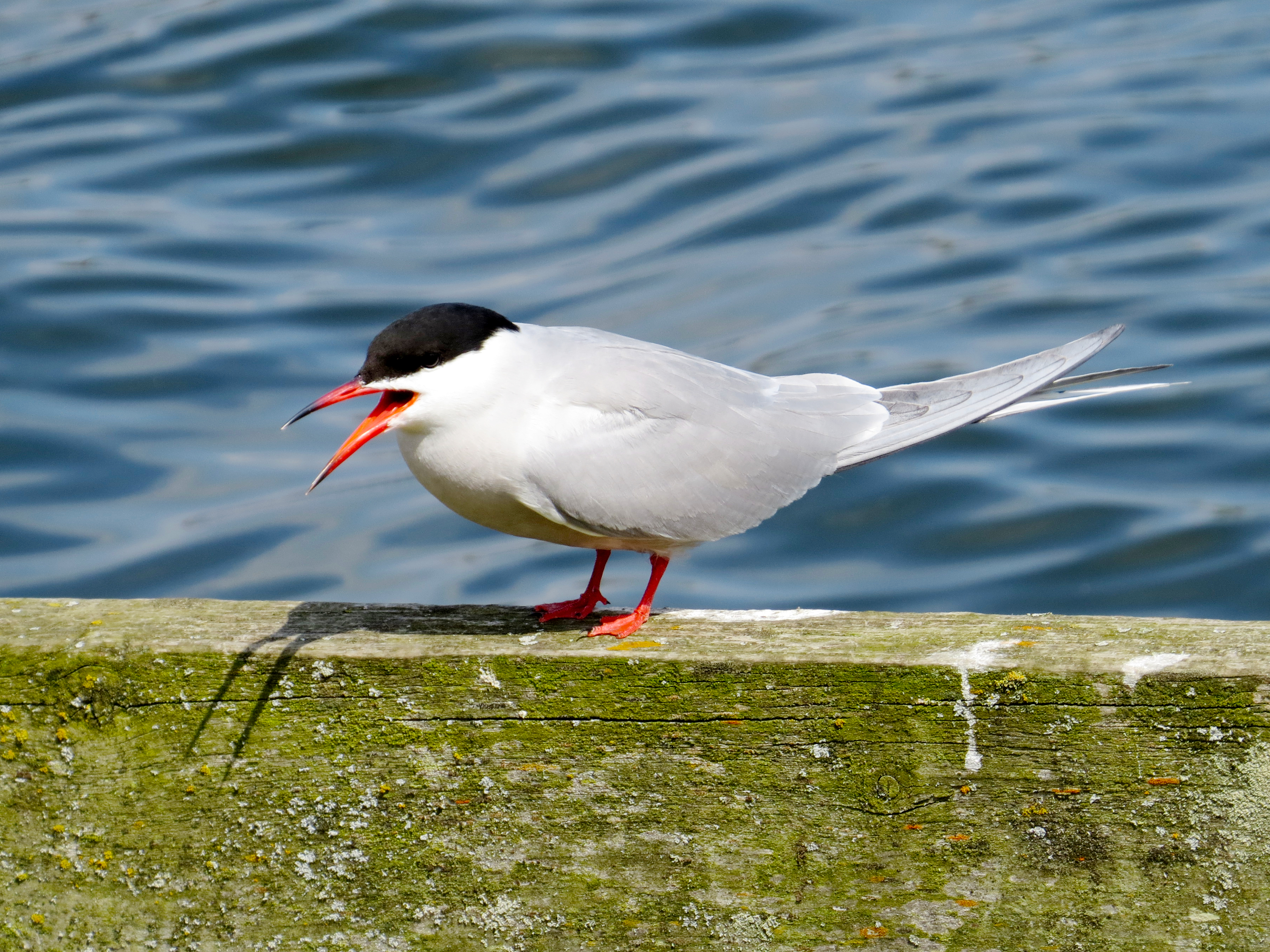
Sterna hirundo

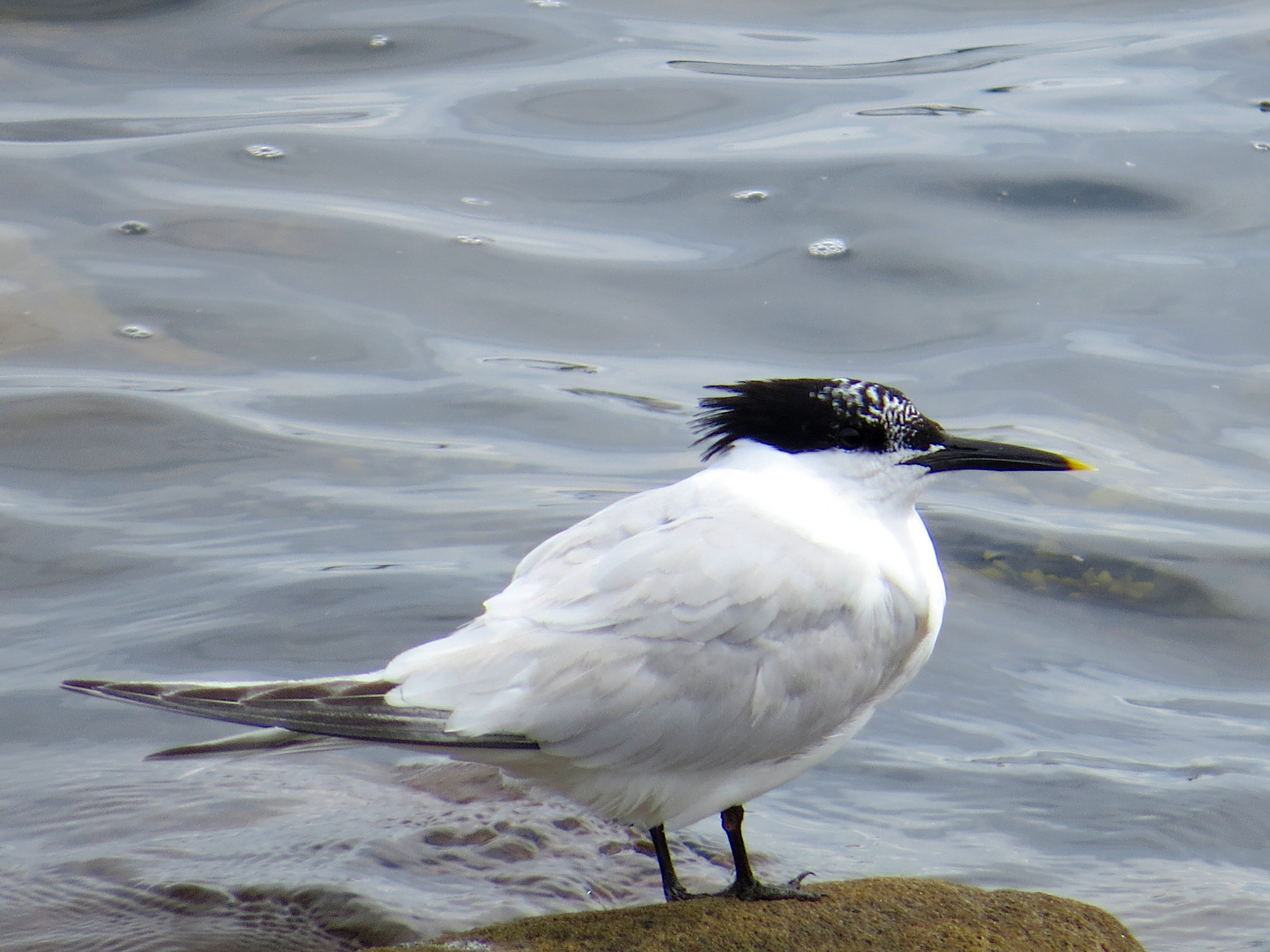
Thalasseus sandvicensis

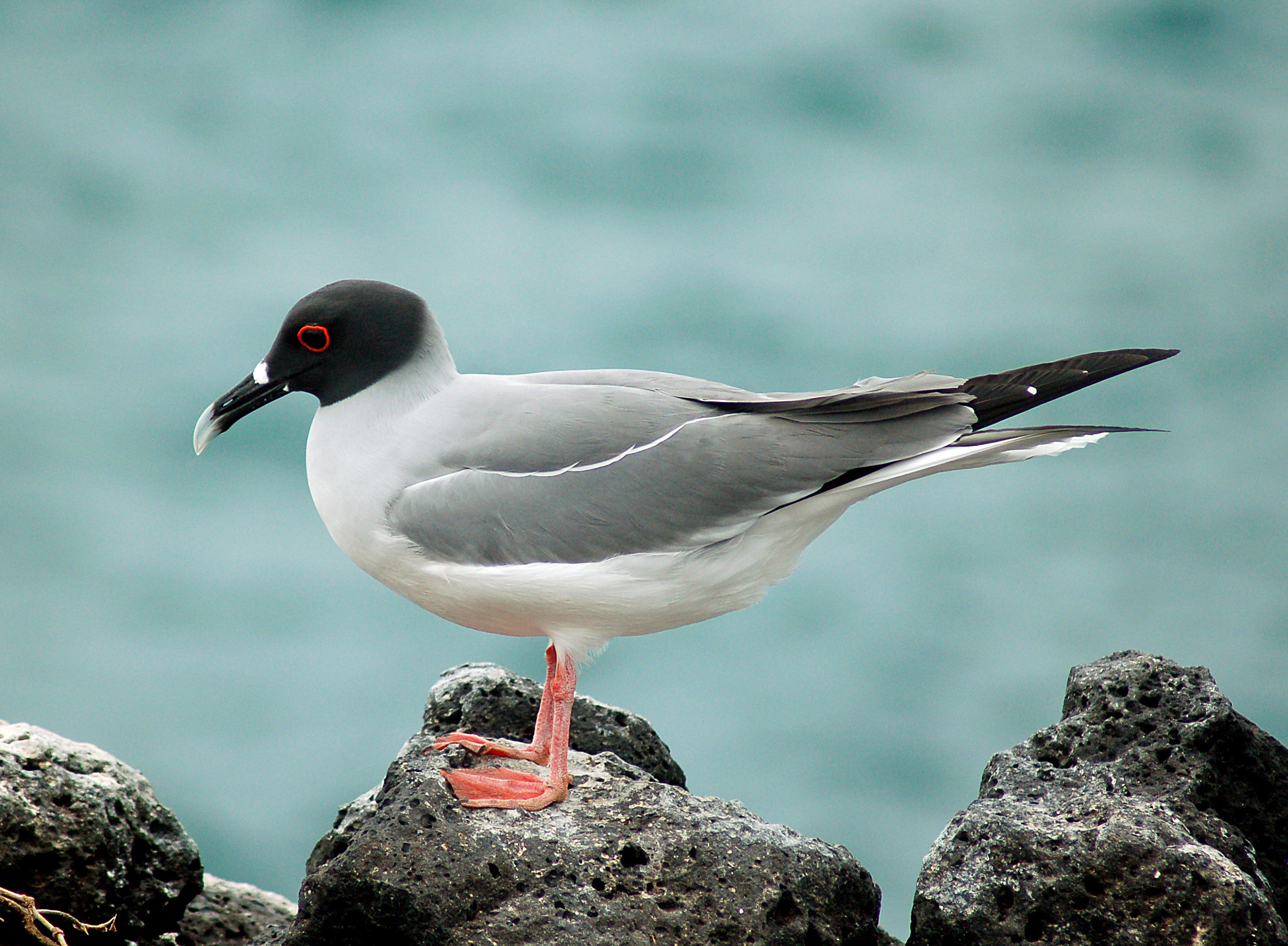
Creagrus furcatus

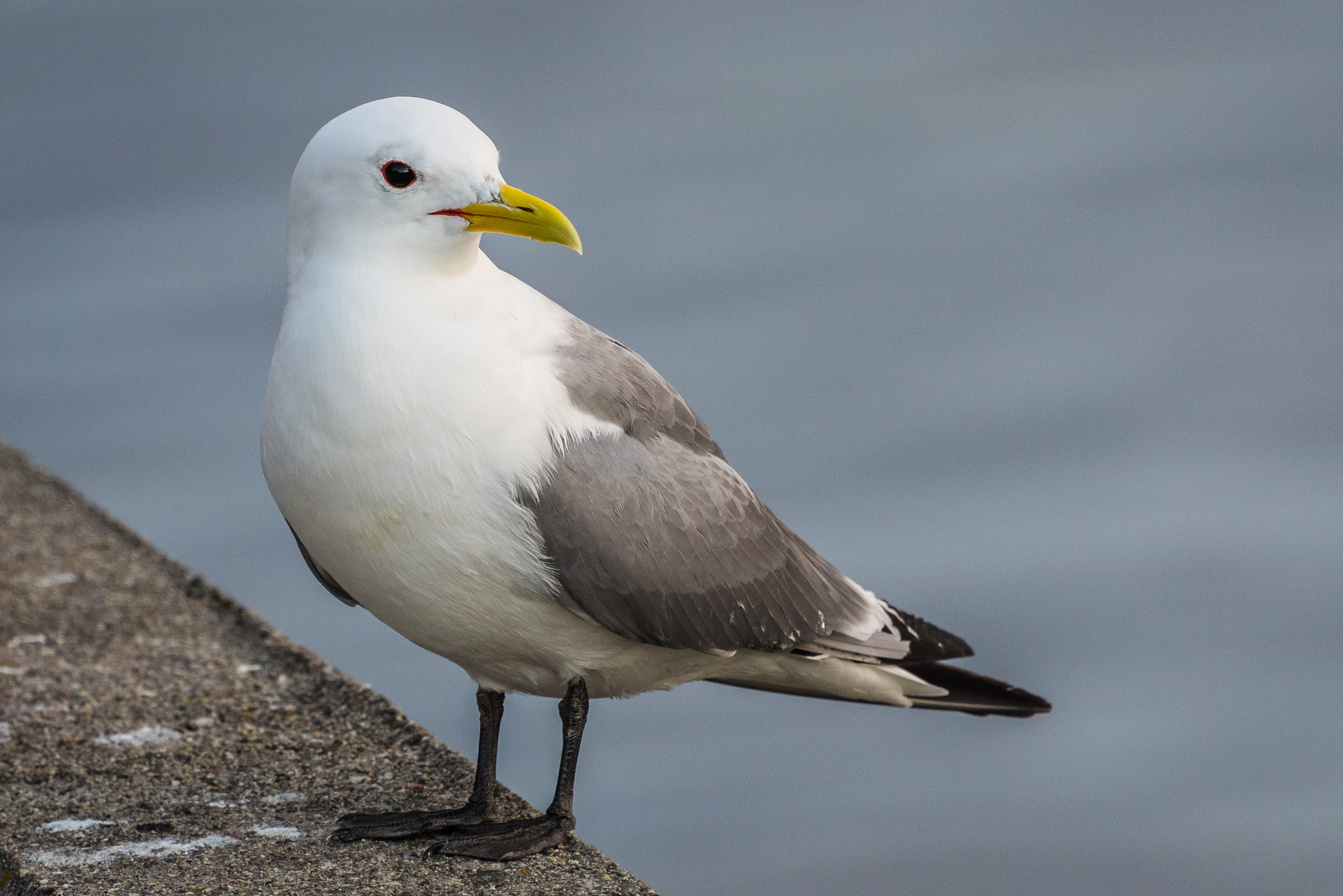
Rissa tridactyla

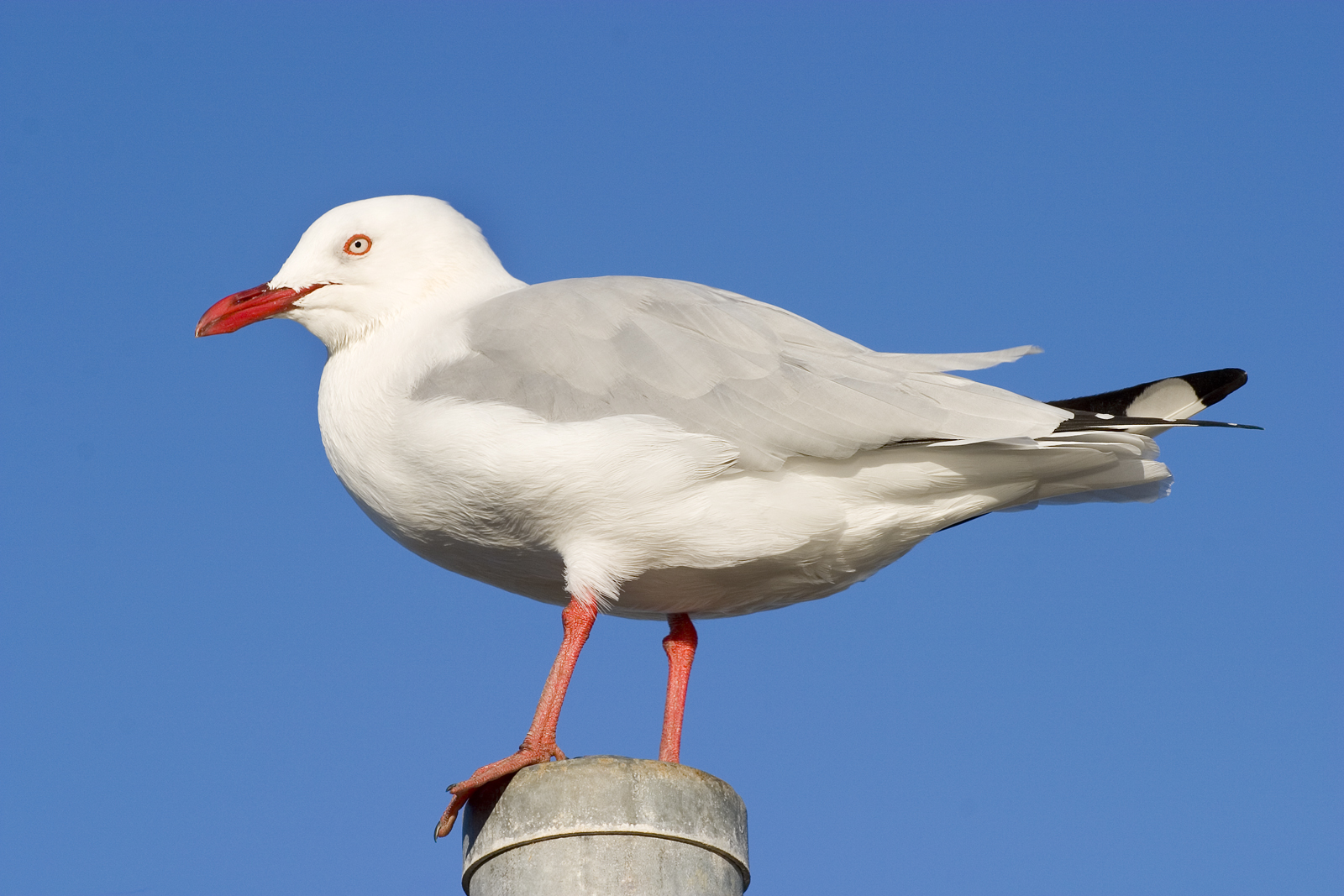
Chroicocephalus novaehollandiae

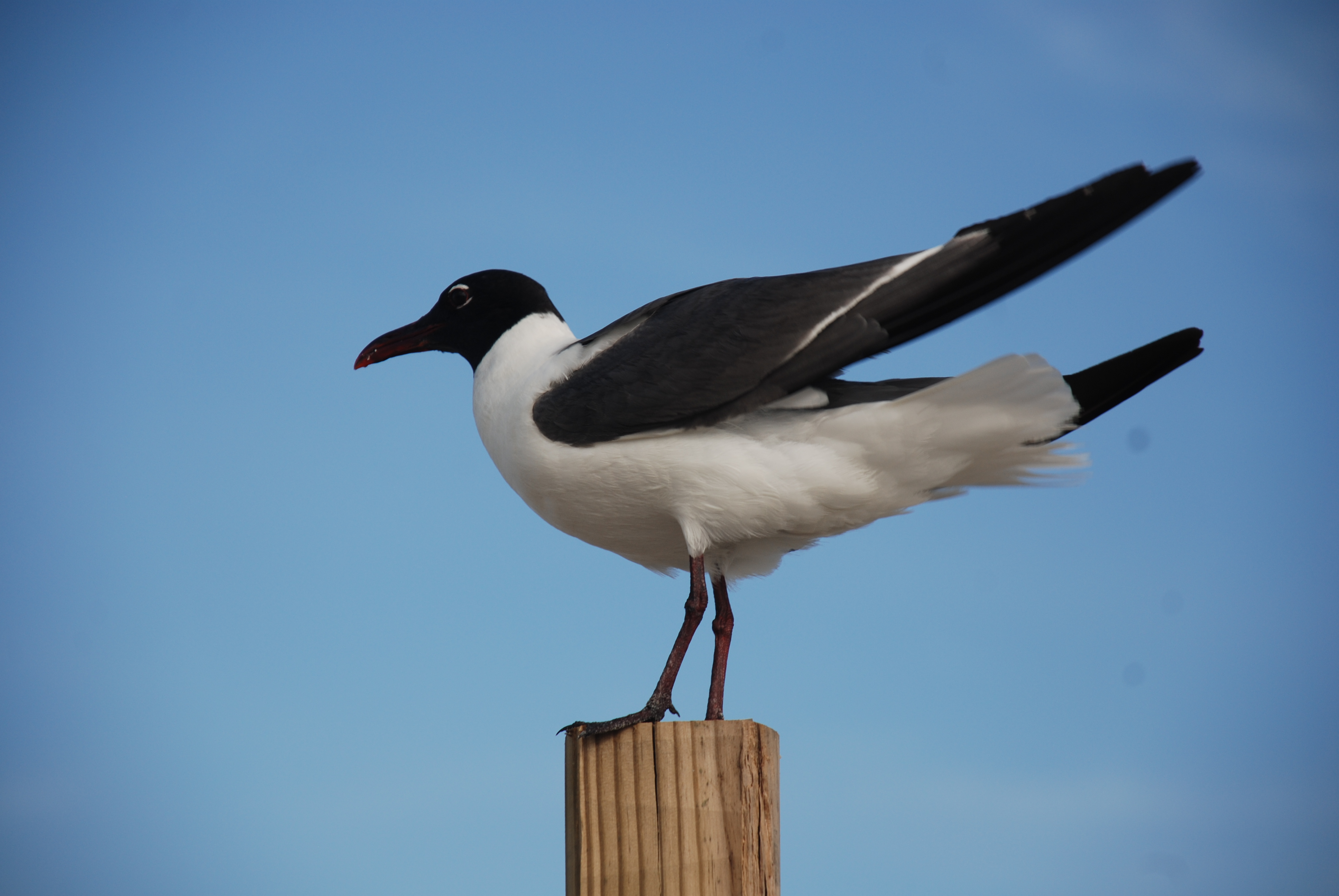
Leucophaeus atricilla

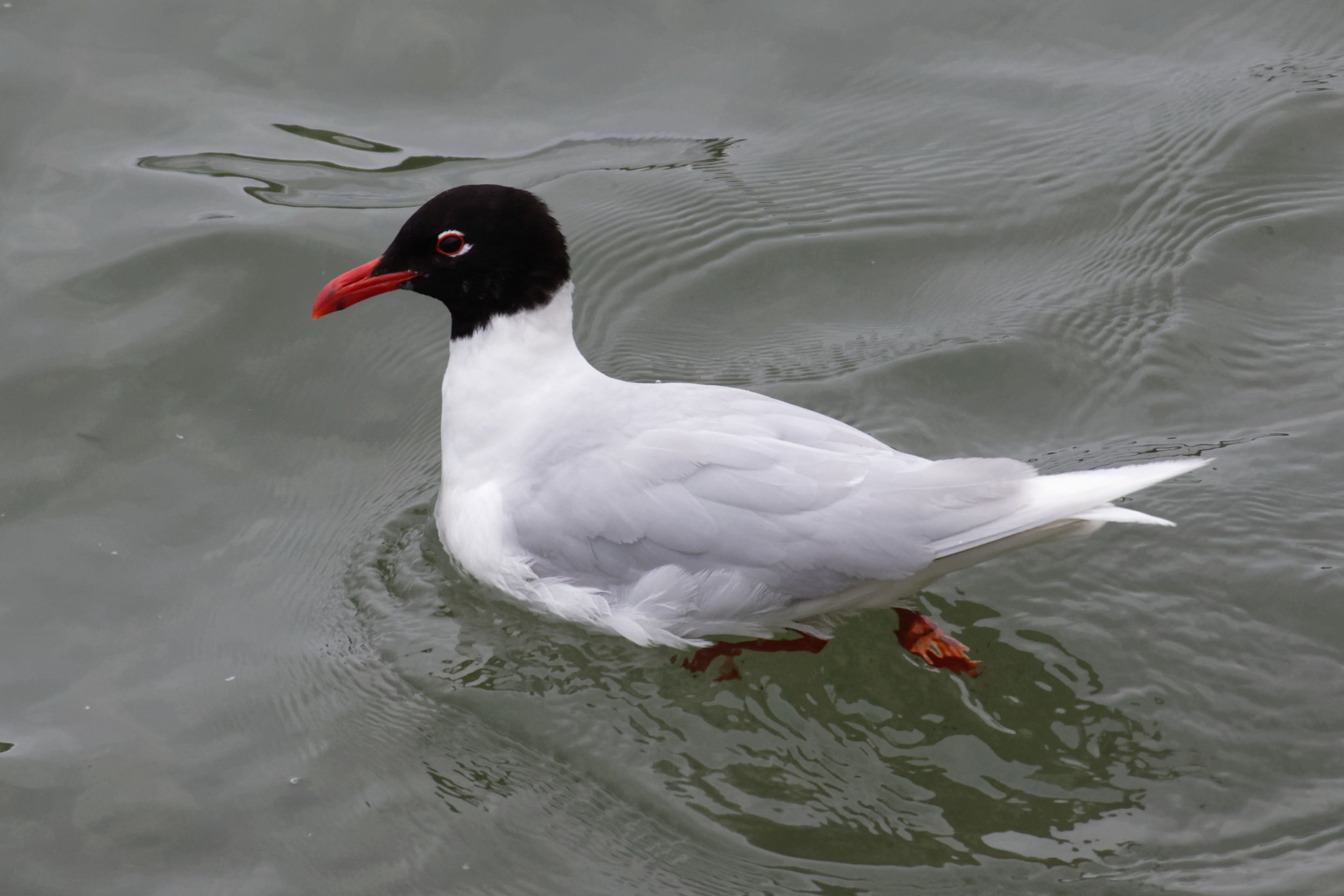
Ichthyaetus melanocephalus

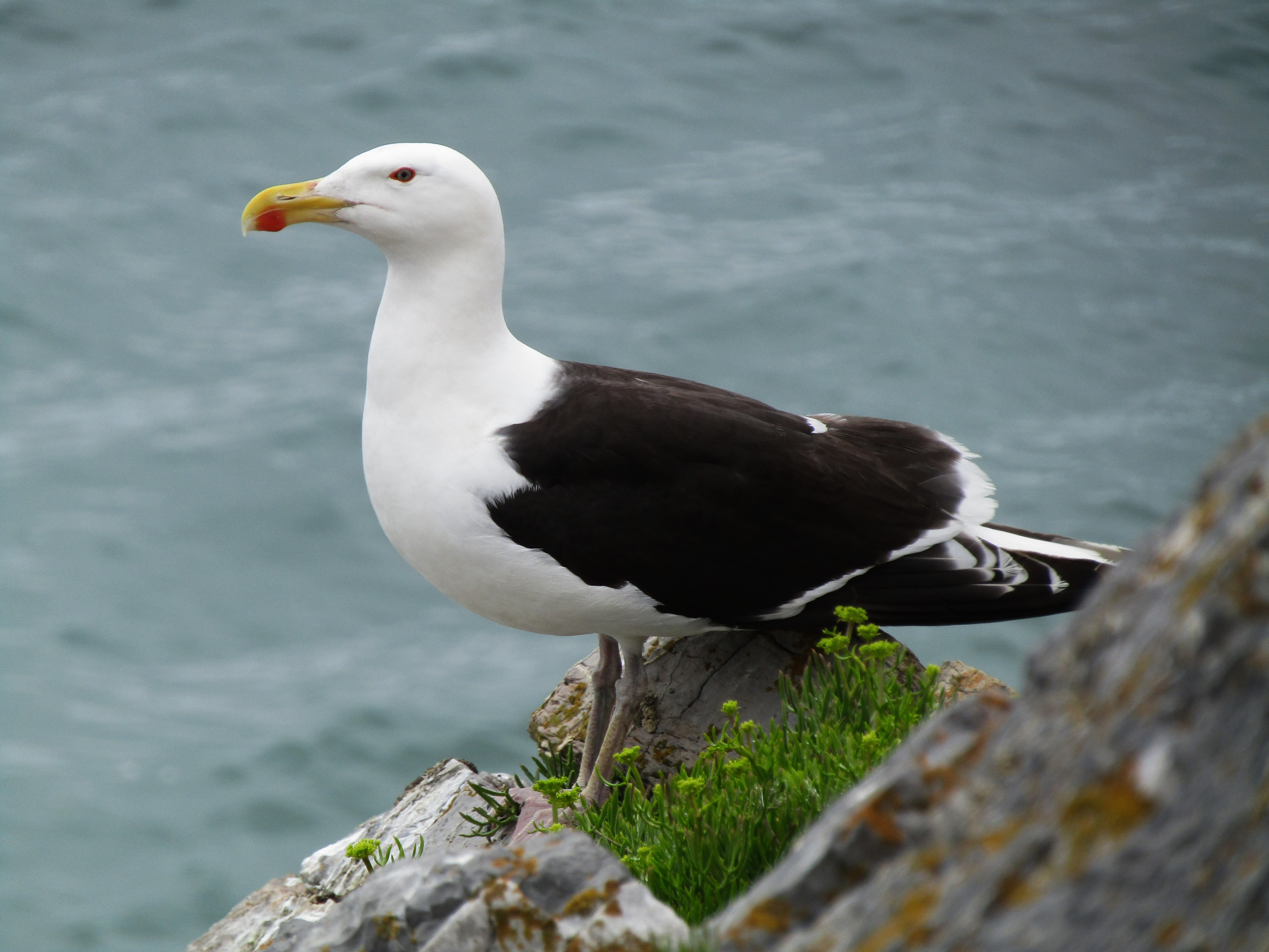
Larus marinus

The avian family Laridae comprises the skimmers, noddies, terns, kittiwakes, and gulls. The International Ornithological Committee (IOC) accepts these 104 species in Laridae, distributed among three subfamilies and 22 genera.

This list is presented according to the IOC taxonomic sequence and can also be sorted alphabetically by common name and binomial.

| Common name | Binomial name | IOC sequence |
|---|---|---|
| African skimmer | Rynchops flavirostris Vieillot, 1816 | 1 |
| Indian skimmer | Rynchops albicollis Swainson, 1838 | 2 |
| Black skimmer | Rynchops niger Linnaeus, 1758 | 3 |
| White tern | Gygis alba (Sparrman, 1786) | 4 |
| Brown noddy | Anous stolidus (Linnaeus, 1758) | 5 |
| Lesser noddy | Anous tenuirostris (Temminck, 1823) | 6 |
| Black noddy | Anous minutus Boie, F, 1844 | 7 |
| Grey noddy | Anous albivitta (Bonaparte, 1856) | 8 |
| Blue noddy | Anous ceruleus (Bennett, FD, 1840) | 9 |
| Aleutian tern | Onychoprion aleuticus (Baird, SF, 1869) | 10 |
| Sooty tern | Onychoprion fuscatus (Linnaeus, 1766) | 11 |
| Bridled tern | Onychoprion anaethetus (Scopoli, 1786) | 12 |
| Spectacled tern | Onychoprion lunatus (Peale, 1849) | 13 |
| Little tern | Sternula albifrons (Pallas, 1764) | 14 |
| Saunders's tern | Sternula saundersi (Hume, 1877) | 15 |
| Least tern | Sternula antillarum Lesson, RP, 1847 | 16 |
| Yellow-billed tern | Sternula superciliaris (Vieillot, 1819) | 17 |
| Peruvian tern | Sternula lorata (Philippi & Landbeck, 1861) | 18 |
| Fairy tern | Sternula nereis Gould, 1843 | 19 |
| Damara tern | Sternula balaenarum Strickland, 1853 | 20 |
| Large-billed tern | Phaetusa simplex (Gmelin, JF, 1789) | 21 |
| Gull-billed tern | Gelochelidon nilotica (Gmelin, JF, 1789) | 22 |
| Australian tern | Gelochelidon macrotarsa (Gould, 1837) | 23 |
| Caspian tern | Hydroprogne caspia (Pallas, 1770) | 24 |
| Inca tern | Larosterna inca (Lesson, RP & Garnot, 1827) | 25 |
| Whiskered tern | Chlidonias hybrida (Pallas, 1811) | 26 |
| Black-fronted tern | Chlidonias albostriatus (Gray, GR, 1845) | 27 |
| Black tern | Chlidonias niger (Linnaeus, 1758) | 28 |
| White-winged tern | Chlidonias leucopterus (Temminck, 1815) | 29 |
| River tern | Sterna aurantia Gray, JE, 1831 | 30 |
| Forster's tern | Sterna forsteri Nuttall, 1834 | 31 |
| Snowy-crowned tern | Sterna trudeaui Audubon, 1838 | 32 |
| Arctic tern | Sterna paradisaea Pontoppidan, 1763 | 33 |
| South American tern | Sterna hirundinacea Lesson, RP, 1831 | 34 |
| Antarctic tern | Sterna vittata Gmelin, JF, 1789 | 35 |
| Kerguelen tern | Sterna virgata Cabanis, 1875 | 36 |
| Common tern | Sterna hirundo Linnaeus, 1758 | 37 |
| White-cheeked tern | Sterna repressa Hartert, EJO, 1916 | 38 |
| Black-naped tern | Sterna sumatrana Raffles, 1822 | 39 |
| Roseate tern | Sterna dougallii Montagu, 1813 | 40 |
| White-fronted tern | Sterna striata Gmelin, JF, 1789 | 41 |
| Black-bellied tern | Sterna acuticauda Gray, JE, 1831 | 42 |
| Sandwich tern | Thalasseus sandvicensis (Latham, 1787) | 43 |
| Cabot's tern | Thalasseus acuflavidus (Cabot, S, 1847) | 44 |
| Elegant tern | Thalasseus elegans (Gambel, 1849) | 45 |
| Lesser crested tern | Thalasseus bengalensis (Lesson, RP, 1831) | 46 |
| West African crested tern | Thalasseus albididorsalis (Hartert, EJO, 1921) | 47 |
| Royal tern | Thalasseus maximus (Boddaert, 1783) | 48 |
| Greater crested tern | Thalasseus bergii (Lichtenstein, MHC, 1823) | 49 |
| Chinese crested tern | Thalasseus bernsteini (Schlegel, 1863) | 50 |
| Swallow-tailed gull | Creagrus furcatus (Néboux, 1842) | 51 |
| Little gull | Hydrocoloeus minutus (Pallas, 1776) | 52 |
| Ross's gull | Rhodostethia rosea (MacGillivray, W, 1824) | 53 |
| Black-legged kittiwake | Rissa tridactyla (Linnaeus, 1758) | 54 |
| Red-legged kittiwake | Rissa brevirostris (Bruch, 1855) | 55 |
| Ivory gull | Pagophila eburnea (Phipps, 1774) | 56 |
| Sabine's gull | Xema sabini (Sabine, 1819) | 57 |
| Saunders's gull | Saundersilarus saundersi Swinhoe, 1871 | 58 |
| Slender-billed gull | Chroicocephalus genei (Brème, 1839) | 59 |
| Bonaparte's gull | Chroicocephalus philadelphia (Ord, 1815) | 60 |
| Silver gull | Chroicocephalus novaehollandiae (Stephens, 1826) | 61 |
| Black-billed gull | Chroicocephalus bulleri (Hutton, FW, 1871) | 62 |
| Andean gull | Chroicocephalus serranus (Tschudi, 1844) | 63 |
| Brown-hooded gull | Chroicocephalus maculipennis (Lichtenstein, MHC, 1823) | 67 |
| Black-headed gull | Chroicocephalus ridibundus (Linnaeus, 1766) | 65 |
| Brown-headed gull | Chroicocephalus brunnicephalus (Jerdon, 1840) | 66 |
| Grey-headed gull | Chroicocephalus cirrocephalus (Vieillot, 1818) | 67 |
| Hartlaub's gull | Chroicocephalus hartlaubii (Bruch, 1855) | 68 |
| Grey gull | Leucophaeus modestus (Tschudi, 1843) | 69 |
| Dolphin gull | Leucophaeus scoresbii (Traill, 1823) | 70 |
| Laughing gull | Leucophaeus atricilla (Linnaeus, 1758) | 71 |
| Franklin's gull | Leucophaeus pipixcan (Wagler, 1831) | 72 |
| Lava gull | Leucophaeus fuliginosus (Gould, 1841) | 73 |
| Pallas's gull | Ichthyaetus ichthyaetus (Pallas, 1773) | 74 |
| Relict gull | Ichthyaetus relictus (Lönnberg, 1931) | 75 |
| Audouin's gull | Ichthyaetus audouinii (Payraudeau, 1826) | 76 |
| Mediterranean gull | Ichthyaetus melanocephalus (Temminck, 1820) | 77 |
| Sooty gull | Ichthyaetus hemprichii (Bruch, 1855) | 78 |
| White-eyed gull | Ichthyaetus leucophthalmus (Temminck, 1825) | 79 |
| Pacific gull | Larus pacificus Latham, 1801 | 80 |
| Belcher's gull | Larus belcheri Vigors, 1829 | 81 |
| Black-tailed gull | Larus crassirostris Vieillot, 1818 | 82 |
| Olrog's gull | Larus atlanticus Olrog, 1958 | 83 |
| Heermann's gull | Larus heermanni Cassin, 1852 | 84 |
| Common gull | Larus canus Linnaeus, 1758 | 85 |
| Short-billed gull | Larus brachyrhynchus Richardson, 1831 | 86 |
| Ring-billed gull | Larus delawarensis Ord, 1815 | 87 |
| Yellow-footed gull | Larus livens Dwight, 1919 | 88 |
| Western gull | Larus occidentalis Audubon, 1839 | 89 |
| Caspian gull | Larus cachinnans Pallas, 1811 | 90 |
| Kelp gull | Larus dominicanus Lichtenstein, MHC, 1823 | 91 |
| European herring gull | Larus argentatus Pontoppidan, 1763 | 92 |
| Vega gull | Larus vegae Palmén, 1887 | 93 |
| Mongolian gull | Larus mongolicus Sushkin, 1925 | 94 |
| Yellow-legged gull | Larus michahellis Naumann, JF, 1840 | 95 |
| Armenian gull | Larus armenicus Buturlin, 1934 | 96 |
| Great black-backed gull | Larus marinus Linnaeus, 1758 | 97 |
| Glaucous gull | Larus hyperboreus Gunnerus, 1767 | 98 |
| Lesser black-backed gull | Larus fuscus Linnaeus, 1758 | 99 |
| California gull | Larus californicus Lawrence, 1854 | 100 |
| American herring gull | Larus smithsonianus Coues, 1862 | 101 |
| Glaucous-winged gull | Larus glaucescens Naumann, JF, 1840 | 102 |
| Slaty-backed gull | Larus schistisagus Stejneger, 1884 | 103 |
| Iceland gull | Larus glaucoides Meyer, B, 1822 | 104 |
