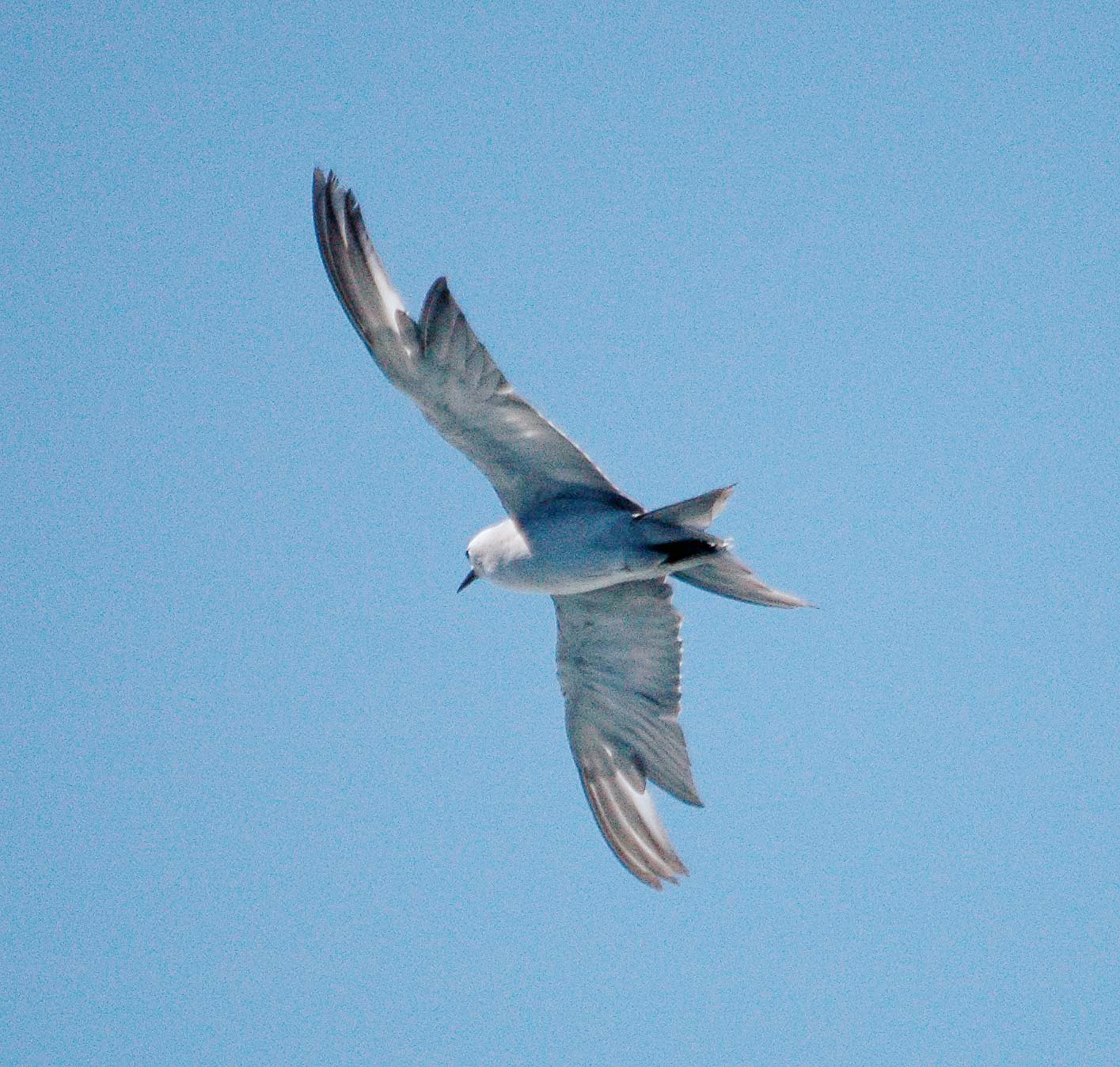

Conservation status
- Least Concern (IUCN 3.1)

Scientific classification
- Kingdom: Animalia
- Phylum: Chordata
- Class: Aves
- Order: Charadriiformes
- Family: Laridae
- Genus: Anous
- Species: A. albivitta

Binomial name
- Anous albivitta (Bonaparte, 1856)

Synonyms
- Procelsterna albivitta (Bonaparte, 1856)

= Grey noddy =

Species of bird

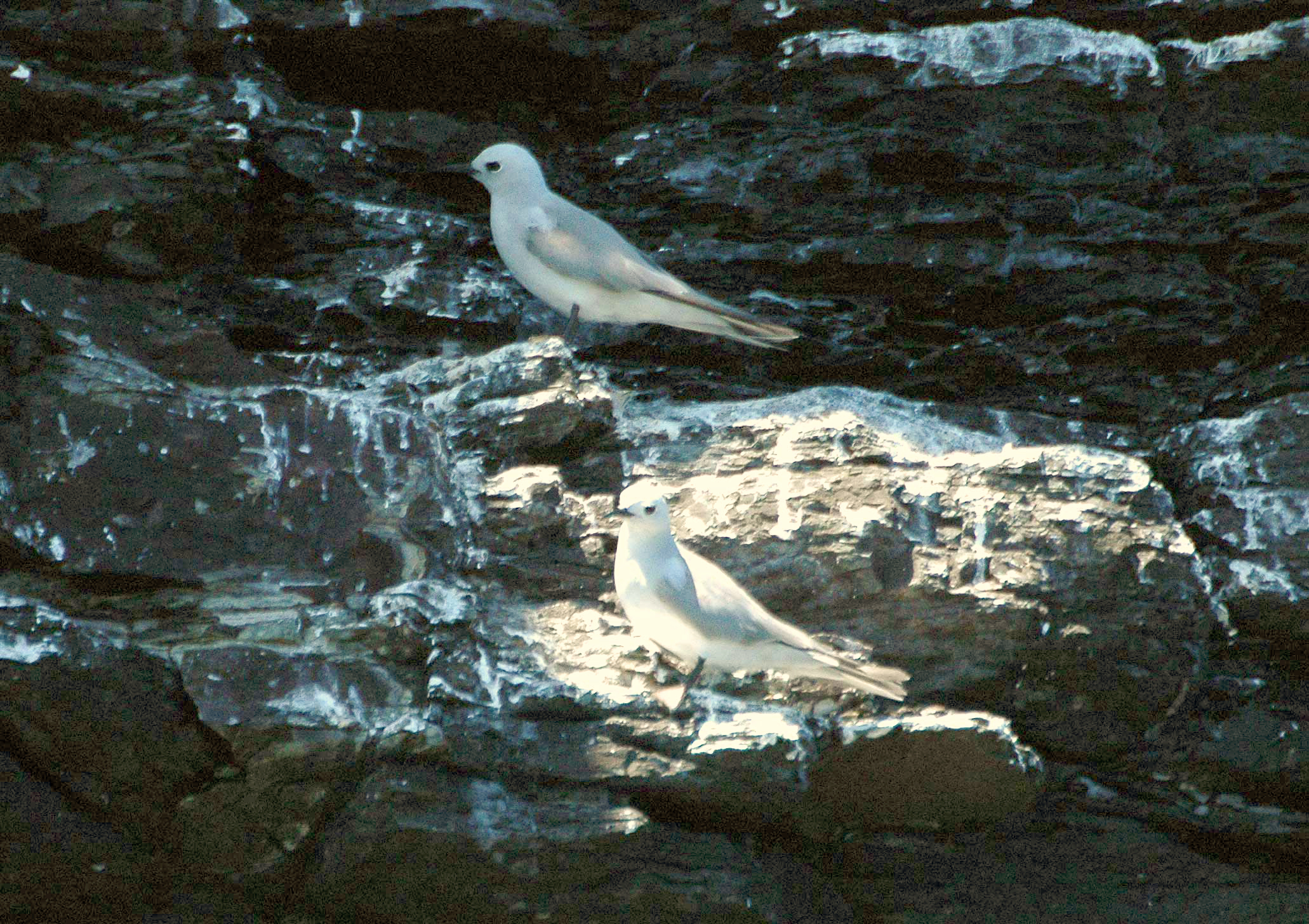
At rookery in northern New Zealand

The grey noddy or grey ternlet (Anous albivitta) is a seabird belonging to the family Laridae. It was once regarded as a pale morph of the blue noddy (Anous ceruleus) but is now usually considered to be a separate species.

== Taxonomy ==
The first formal description of the grey noddy was by the French ornithologist Charles Lucien Bonaparte in 1856 under the binomial name Procelsterna albivitta. The specific name albivitta is from the Latin abus for "white" and vitta for "band" or "head-band".

The grey noddy was formerly placed in the genus Procelsterna. A molecular phylogenetic study published in 2016 found that the five noddies formed a single clade with the grey noddy and blue noddy in Procelsterna nested within the species in the genus Anous. The authors proposed that the noddies should be merged into a single genus Anous and that Procelsterna should be considered as a junior synonym.

Three subspecies are recognised:

- A. a. albivitta (Bonaparte, 1856): Lord Howe, Norfolk and Kermadec Islands, Tonga
- A. a. skottsbergii (Lönnberg, 1921): Henderson, Easter, and Isla Salas y Gómez Islands (west of Chile)
- A. a. imitatrix (Mathews, 1912): San Ambrosio and San Félix Islands (west of Chile)

== Description ==
The grey noddy is 28–31 cm (11–12 in) long with a wingspan of 46–60 cm (18–24 in) and a weight of about 75 grams (2.6 oz). The tail is fairly long and notched. The plumage is pale grey, almost white on the head and underparts but darker on the back, tail and wings. The wings have dark tips and a white hind edge and are mainly white underneath. The eye is black and appears large due to the black patch in front of it. There is a white patch behind the eye. The thin, pointed bill is black and the legs and feet are also black apart from pale yellow webs.

Juvenile birds are browner than the adults and have darker, more contrasting flight feathers.

The grey noddy is usually silent but has a soft, purring call.

== Distribution ==
It occurs in subtropical and warm temperate waters of the south Pacific Ocean. The subspecies A. a. albivitta breeds on Lord Howe Island, Norfolk Island, northern New Zealand (particularly the Kermadec Islands) and southern Tonga (on 'Ata and probably 'Eua). A. a. skottsbergii is found on Henderson Island, Easter Island and Sala y Gómez. A. a. imitatrix breeds on the Desventuradas Islands off the coast of Chile. Some specimens have also been found in Australia, Pitcairn Islands, San Abrosio and San Feliz Islands and Ellice Islands.

== Behaviour ==
It feeds in shallow water, not moving far from the breeding colonies. It gathers in large feeding flocks which can contain thousands of individuals. They feed by hovering over the water and dropping down to pick food from the surface. Plankton forms the bulk of the diet and small fish are also eaten.

Breeding takes place in colonies on rocky islands. The nest site is a sheltered rocky surface or underneath a boulder or clump of vegetation. A single egg is laid. It is whitish with dark markings and is incubated by both parents for about 32 days. The young birds are fed on regurgitated food and fledge after around 35 days.
