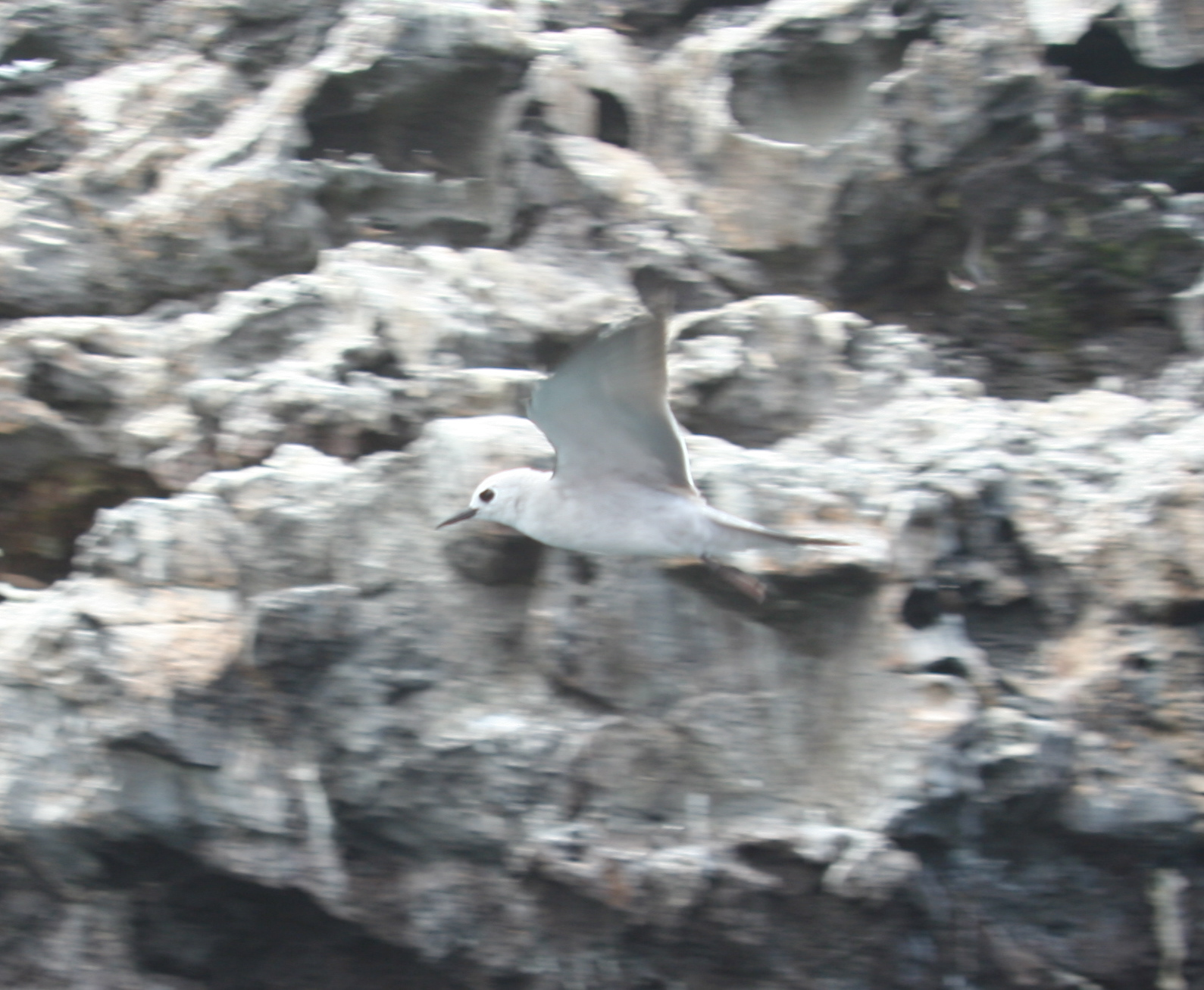

Conservation status
- Least Concern (IUCN 3.1)

Scientific classification
- Kingdom: Animalia
- Phylum: Chordata
- Class: Aves
- Order: Charadriiformes
- Family: Laridae
- Genus: Anous
- Species: A. ceruleus

Binomial name
- Anous ceruleus (Bennett, FD, 1840)

Synonyms
- Procelsterna cerulea (Bennett, 1840)

= Blue noddy =

Species of bird

The blue noddy or hinaokū or manuohina (Anous ceruleus) is a seabird in the family Laridae. It is also known as the blue-grey noddy.

It is found in American Samoa, the Cook Islands, Fiji, French Polynesia, Kiribati, Marshall Islands, New Caledonia, Samoa, Tonga (Niua), Tuvalu and Hawaii. It has occurred as a vagrant in Australia and Japan. Its natural habitat is open, shallow seas in tropical and subtropical regions.

== Taxonomy ==
The first formal description of the blue noddy was by Frederick Debell Bennett in 1840 under the binomial name Sterna cerulea. The specific name ceruleus is Latin for "dark blue".

The blue noddy was formerly placed in the genus Procelsterna. A molecular phylogenetic study published in 2016 found that the five noddies formed a single clade with the blue noddy and the grey noddy in Procelsterna nested between the species in the genus Anous. The authors proposed that the noddies should be merged into a single genus Anous and that Procelsterna should be considered as a junior synonym.

A seabird observed at Necker Island, the French Frigate Shoals, and Nīhoa during a cruise through the Northwestern Hawaiian Islands by the United States Fish Commission research ship USFC Albatross in 1902 originally was thought to be new to science and was given the scientific name Procelsterna saxatalis and the popular name Necker Island tern. It later was reclassified as a subspecies of the blue noddy. There are five subspecies:

- A. c. saxatilis (Fisher, 1903): Marcus Island & north Marshall Islands to the Northwestern Hawaiian Islands
- A. c. ceruleus (Bennett, 1840): Kiritimati Island & the Marquesas Islands
- A. c. nebouxi (Mathews, 1912): Phoenix Islands, Tuvalu, Fiji & the Samoan Islands
- A. c. teretirostris (Lafresnaye, 1841):Tuamotu Archipelago, Cook, Austral & Society Islands
- A. c. murphyi (Mougin & Naurois, 1981): Gambier Islands (French Polynesia)

The grey noddy (Anous albivitta) replaces it to the south of its range; the two were formerly considered to be a single species but are now often split.

== Description ==
The blue noddy is 25–28 cm (9.8–11.0 in) in length and has a wingspan of 46–60 cm (18–24 in).
