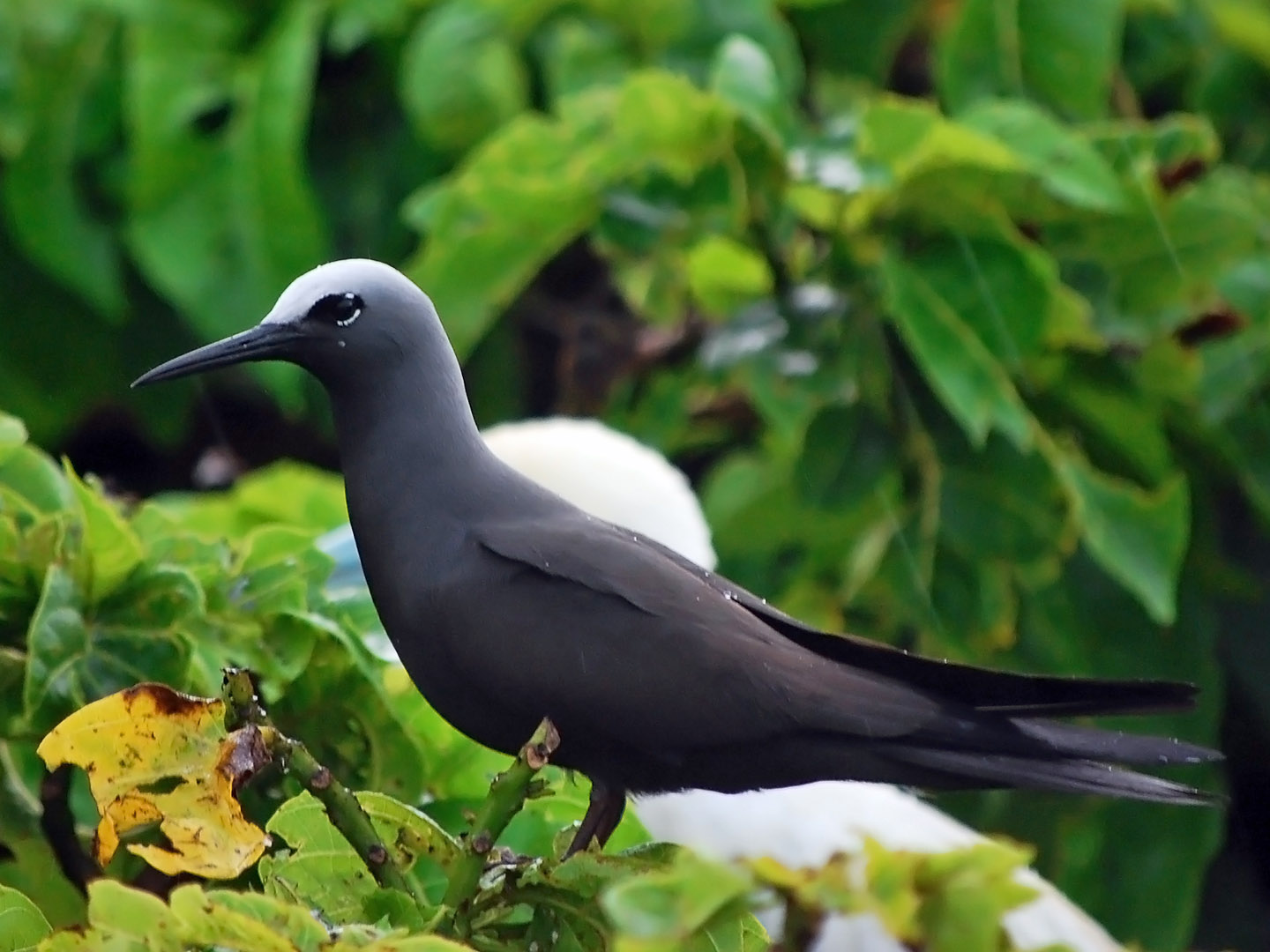
- At the Tubbataha Reef National Park, Philippines

Conservation status
- Least Concern (IUCN 3.1)

Scientific classification
- Kingdom: Animalia
- Phylum: Chordata
- Class: Aves
- Order: Charadriiformes
- Family: Laridae
- Genus: Anous
- Species: A. minutus

Binomial name
- Anous minutus Boie, F, 1844
- Global map of eBird reports of this species Nonbreeding Breeding

Synonyms
- Megalopterus minutus Gray; Anous hawaiiensis

= Black noddy =

Species of bird

The black noddy (Anous minutus), also known as white-capped noddy, is a species of tern in the family Laridae. It is a medium-sized seabird with black plumage and a white cap that closely resembles the lesser noddy with which it was at one time considered conspecific. The black noddy has slightly darker plumage and dark rather than pale lores.

== Taxonomy ==
The black noddy was first formally described by German naturalist and lawyer Friedrich Boie in 1844 under its current binomial name. The genus name Anous is ancient Greek for "stupid" or "foolish". The specific name minutus is the Latin for "small".

There are seven subspecies:

- A. m. worcesteri (McGregor, 1911) – Cavilli Island and Tubbataha Reef (Sulu Sea)
- A. m. minutus Boie, 1844 – northeast Australia and New Guinea to Tuamotu Archipelago
- A. m. marcusi (Bryan, 1903) – Marcus and Wake Islands through Micronesia to the Caroline Islands
- A. m. melanogenys Gray, 1846 – Hawaiian Islands to the Kermadec Islands
- A. m. diamesus (Heller and Snodgrass, 1901) – Clipperton Island (off western Mexico) and Cocos Island (off western Costa Rica)
- A. m. americanus (Mathews, 1912) – islands in the Caribbean Sea
- A. m. atlanticus (Mathews, 1912) – tropical islands in the Atlantic
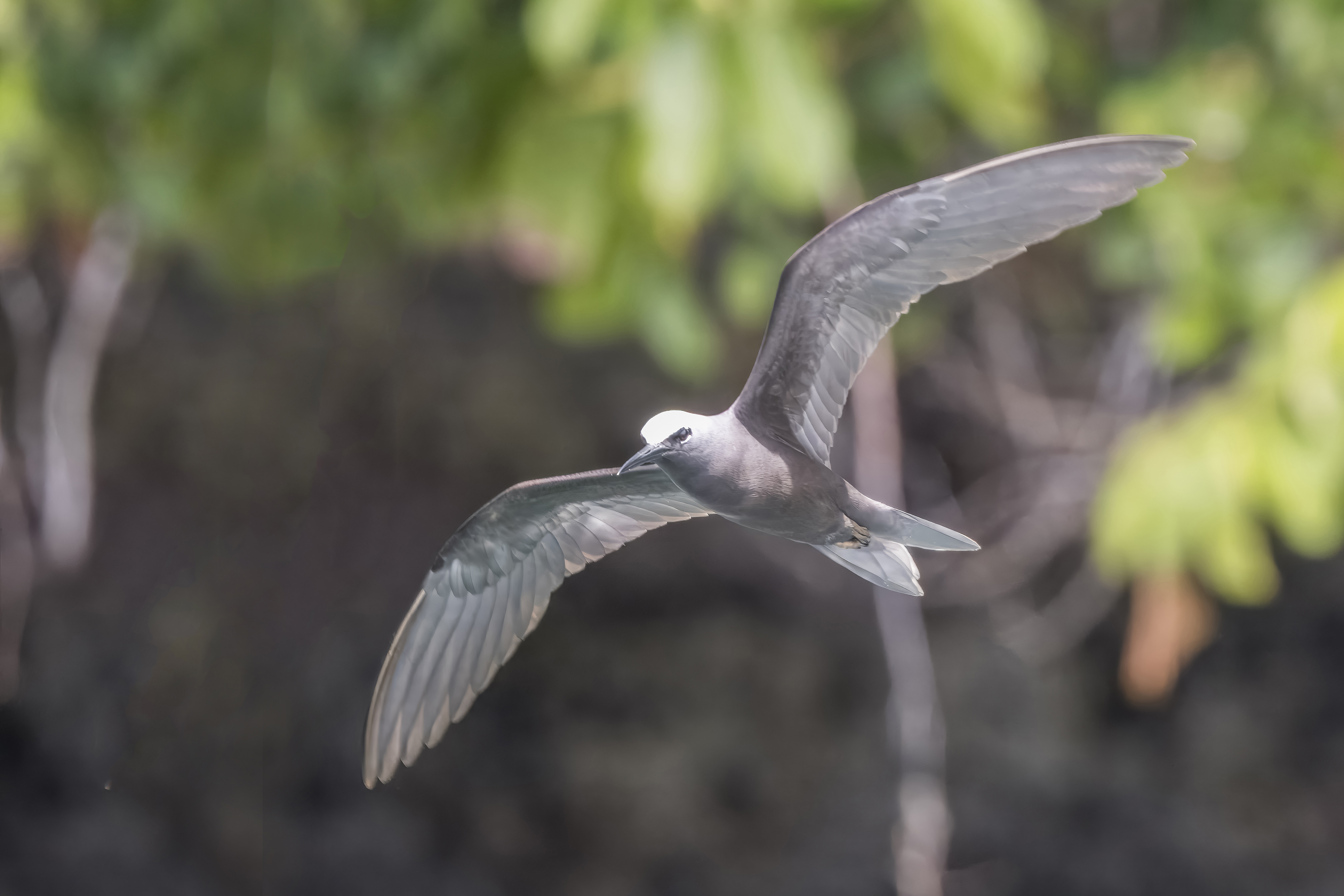
A. m. marcusi, Rock Islands, Palau

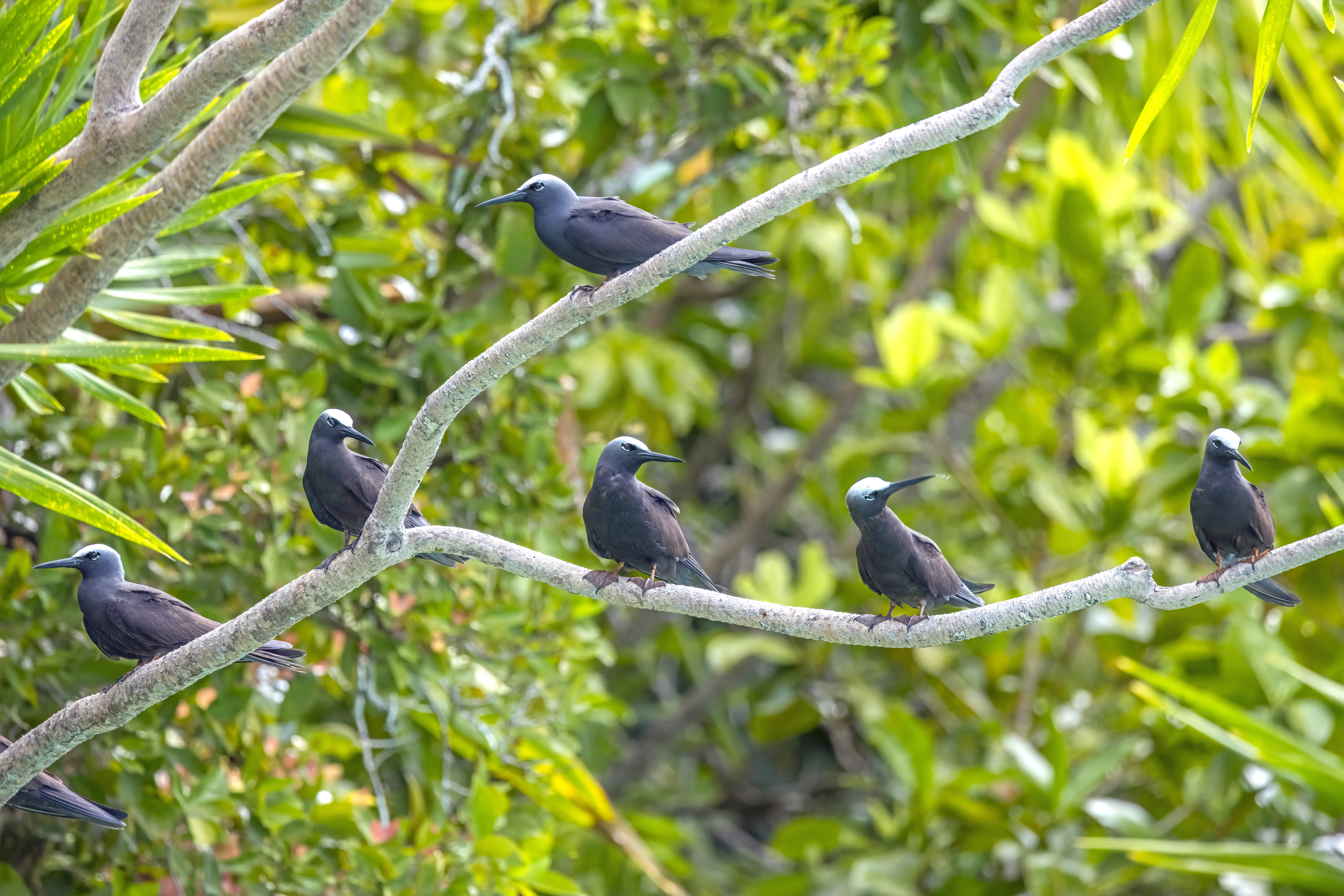
A. m. marcusi, Rock Islands, Palau

== Description ==
The black noddy has a length of 35–37 cm (14–15 in), a wingspan of 66–72 cm (26–28 in) and a weight of 98–144 g (3.5–5.1 oz). It has dark plumage and a pale crown. There is a small white crescent under each eye and a white spot above. It has long tapering wings and a truncated tail. The sharply pointed bill is black. The feet are fully webbed and are black in most subspecies but orange in melanogenys.

Black noddies (Anous minutus marcusi) Rock Islands.jpg

== Behaviour ==
These birds may have become known as "noddies" because of the behaviour of both sexes as they constantly dip their heads during their breeding display. They are very tolerant of humans even to the extent that they can be picked up off the nest. They feed on fish and squid which they gather by flying low over the surface of the sea and picking them up. They may associate with other seabirds in areas where predatory fish are driving small fish to the surface.

The nests of these birds consist of a level platform, often created in the branches of trees by a series of dried leaves covered with bird droppings. One egg is laid each season, and nests are re-used in subsequent years. The trees used for this purpose are various but the Pisonia is most often used, and in large trees, there are often several nests. The guano produced by these birds adds large quantities of nutrients to the soil which is of great importance to the plant communities on coral islands.

== Distribution ==
The black noddy has a worldwide distribution in tropical and subtropical seas, with colonies widespread in the Pacific Ocean and more scattered across the Caribbean, central Atlantic and in the northeast Indian Ocean. At sea it is usually seen close to its breeding colonies within 80 km of shore. Birds return to their colonies, or to other islands, to roost at night.

Lady Elliot Island, Qld, Australia

== Gallery ==
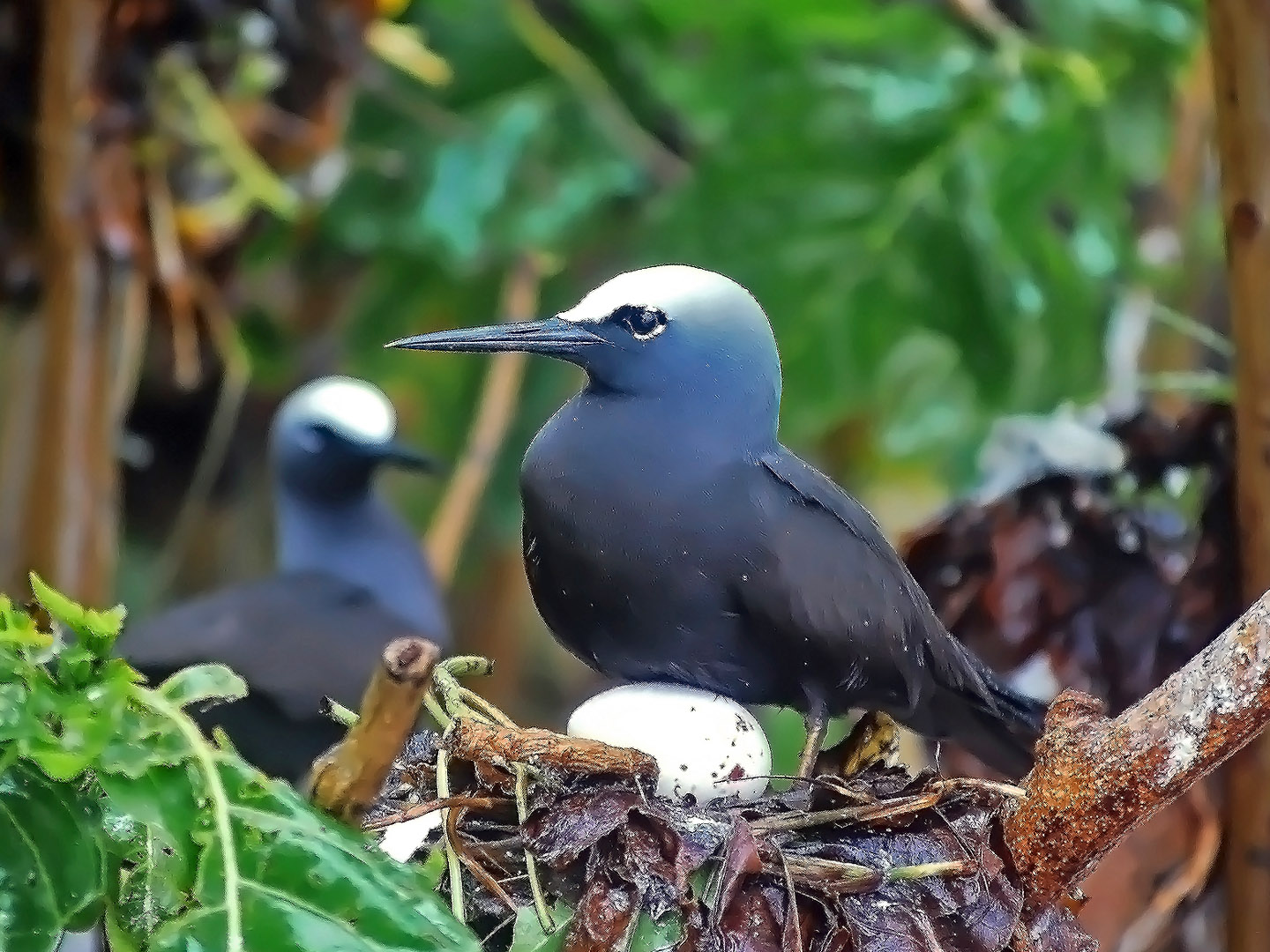
Nesting in Tubbataha Reef National Park, Philippines

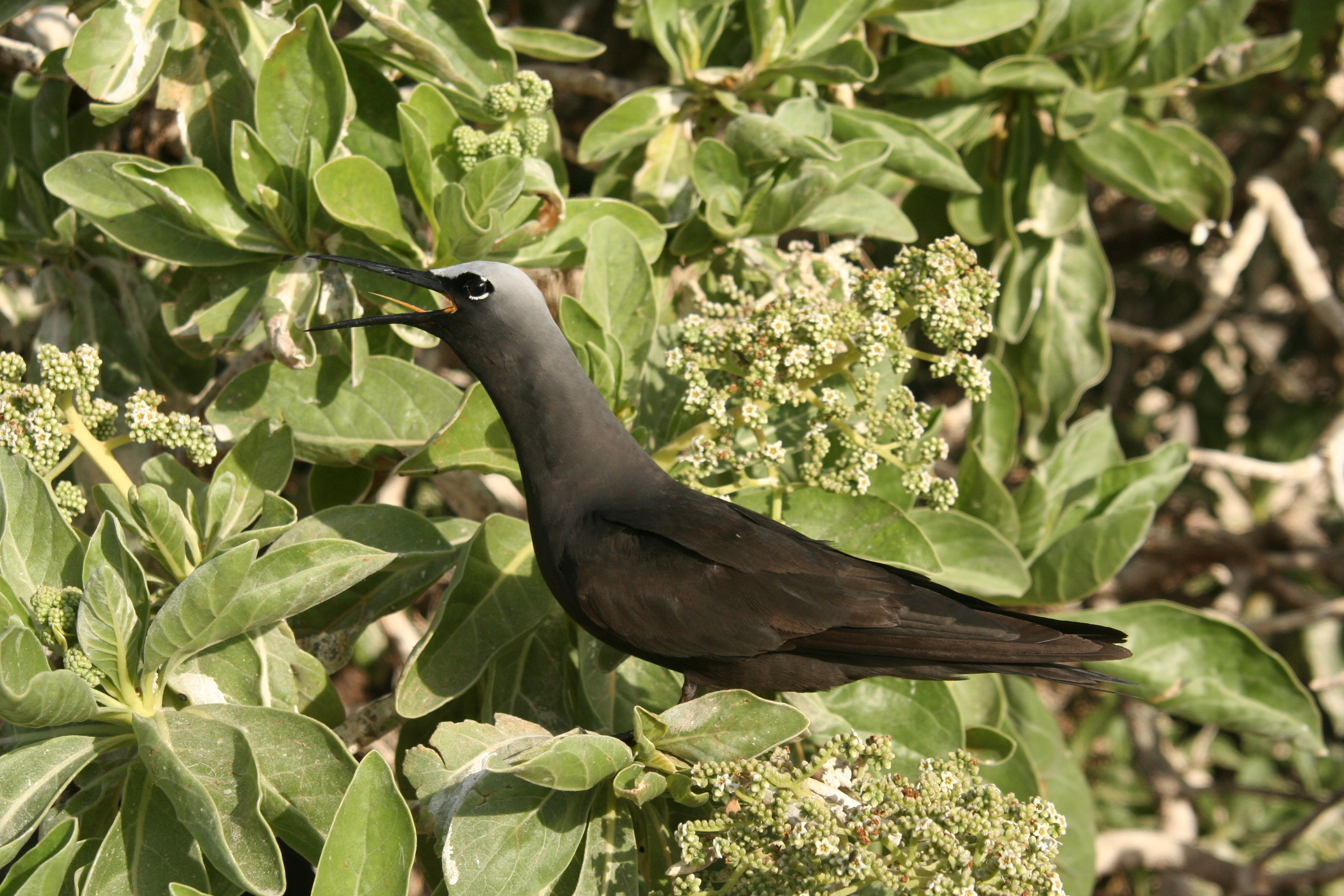
Calling at colony.

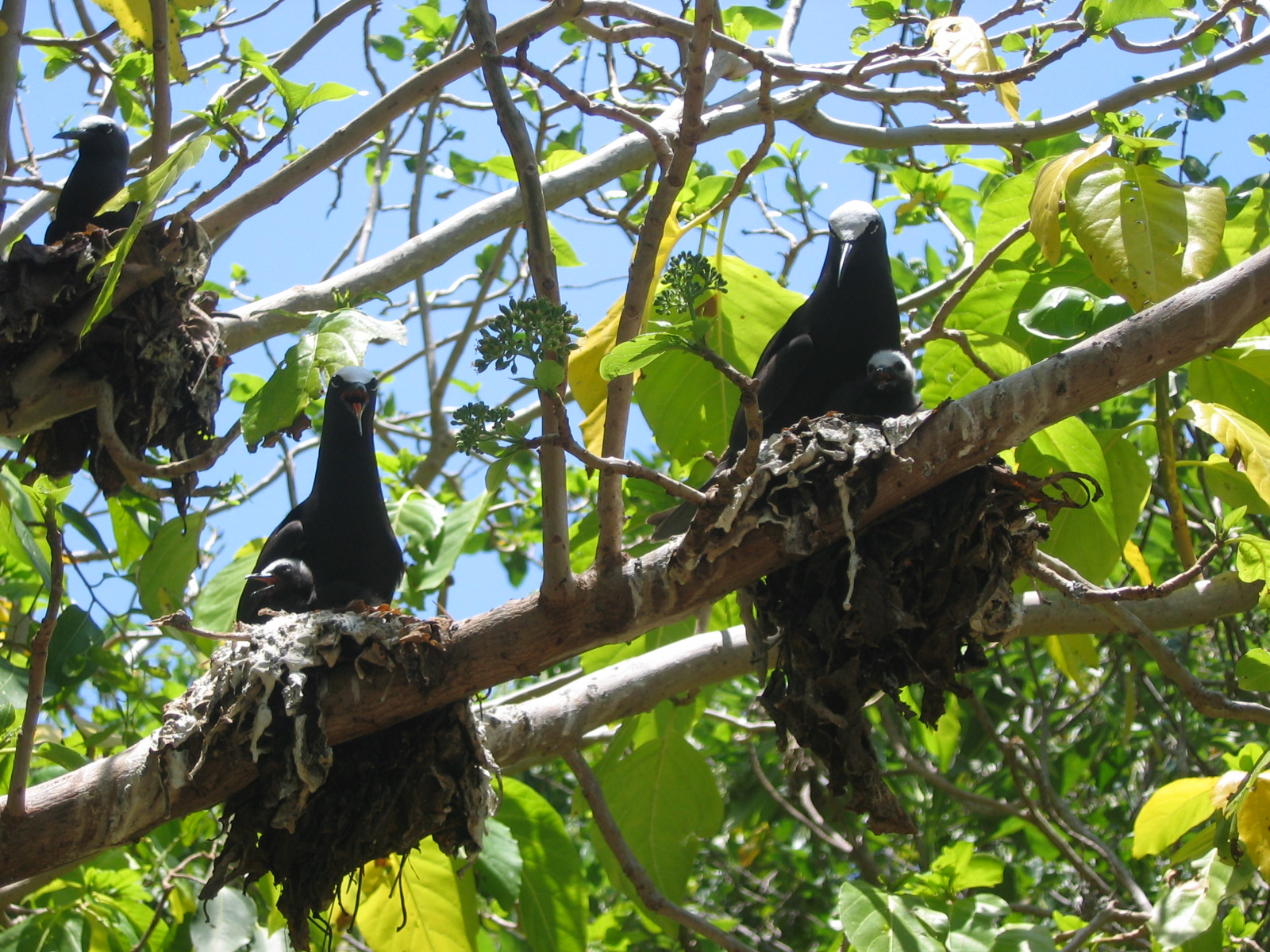
Nesting on Heron Island, Australia

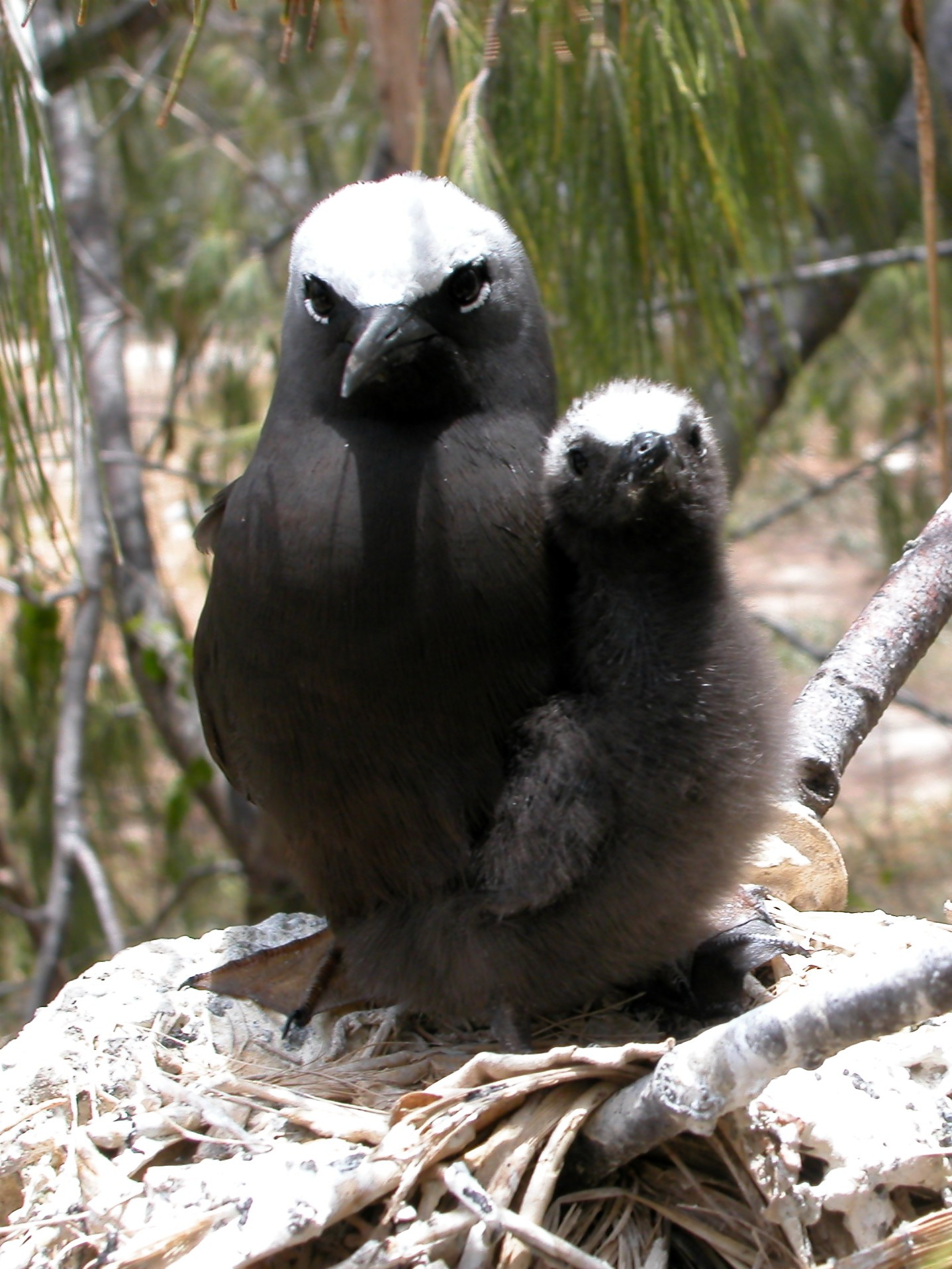
Black noddy with chick

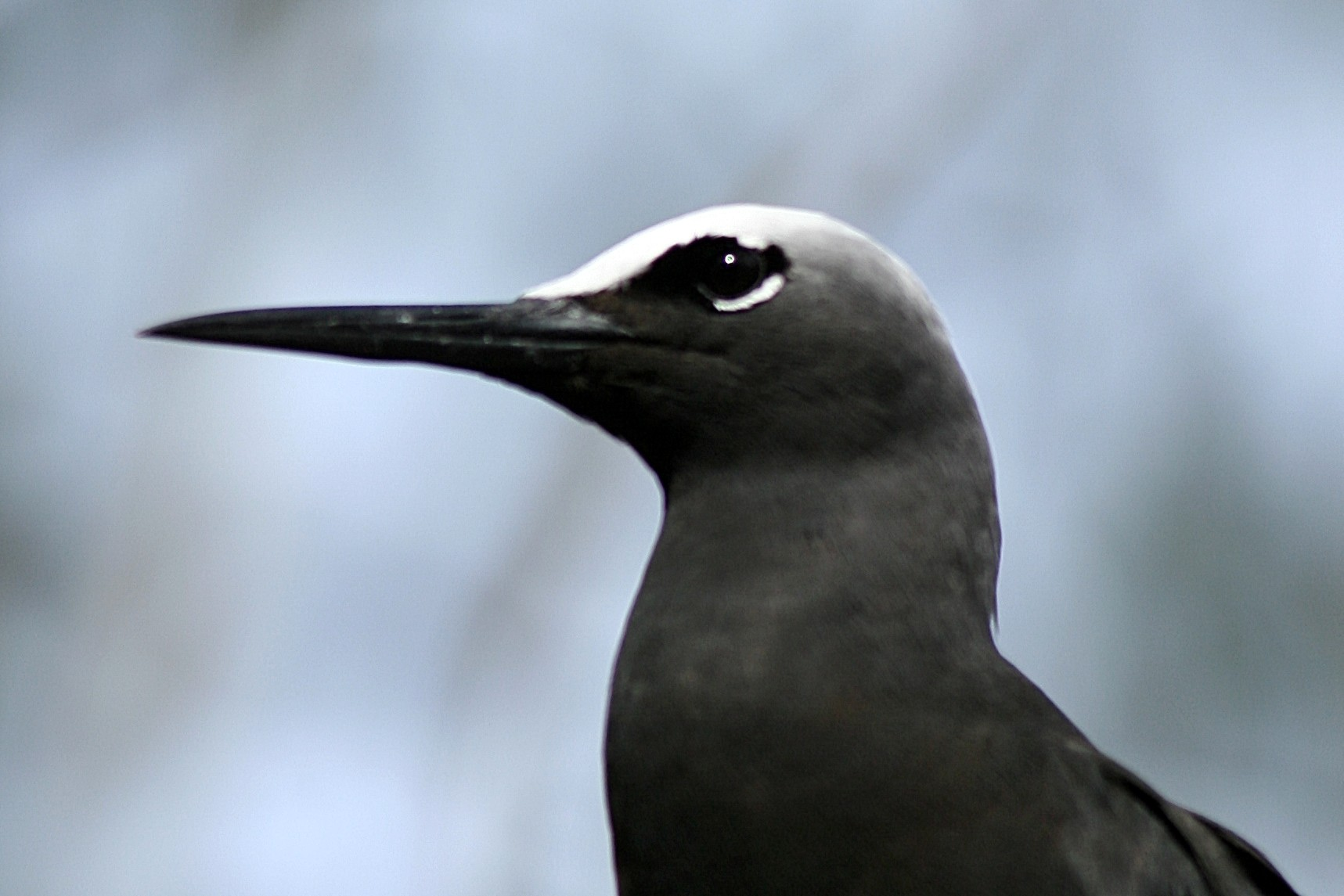
Black noddy head

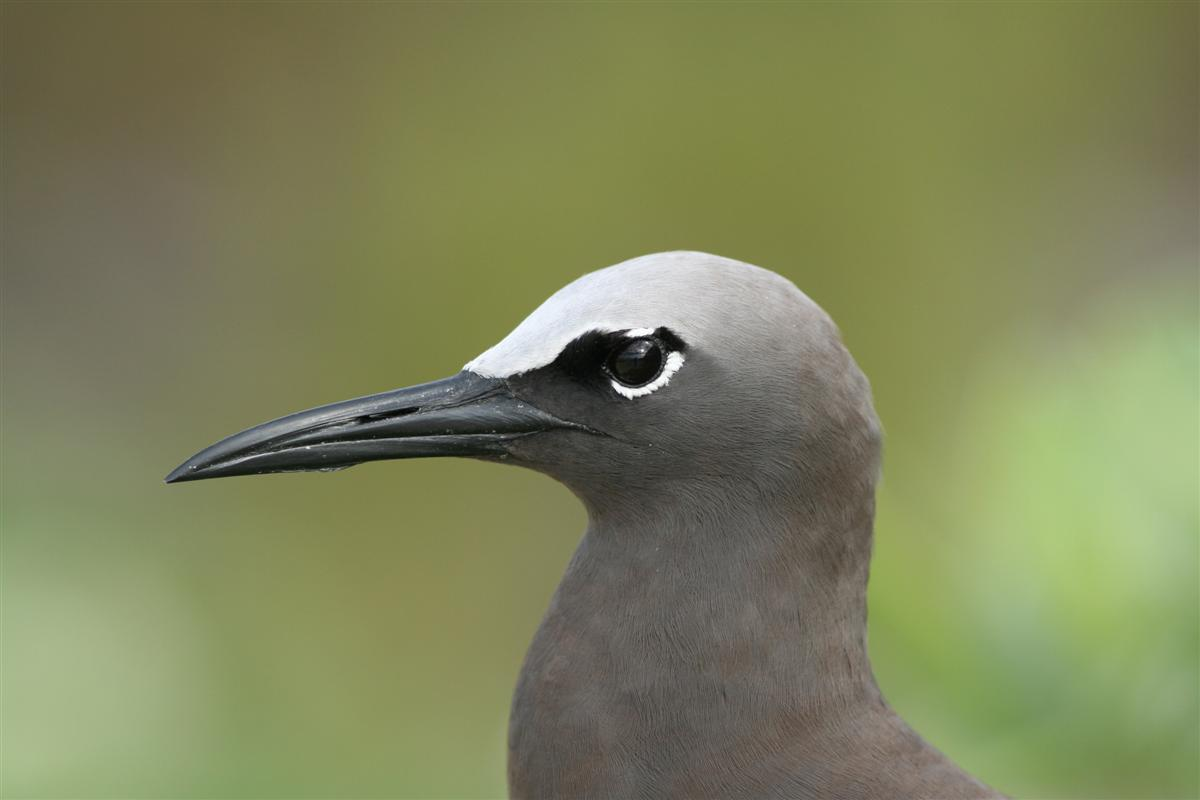
Common noddy head - note stouter beak, greyer cap

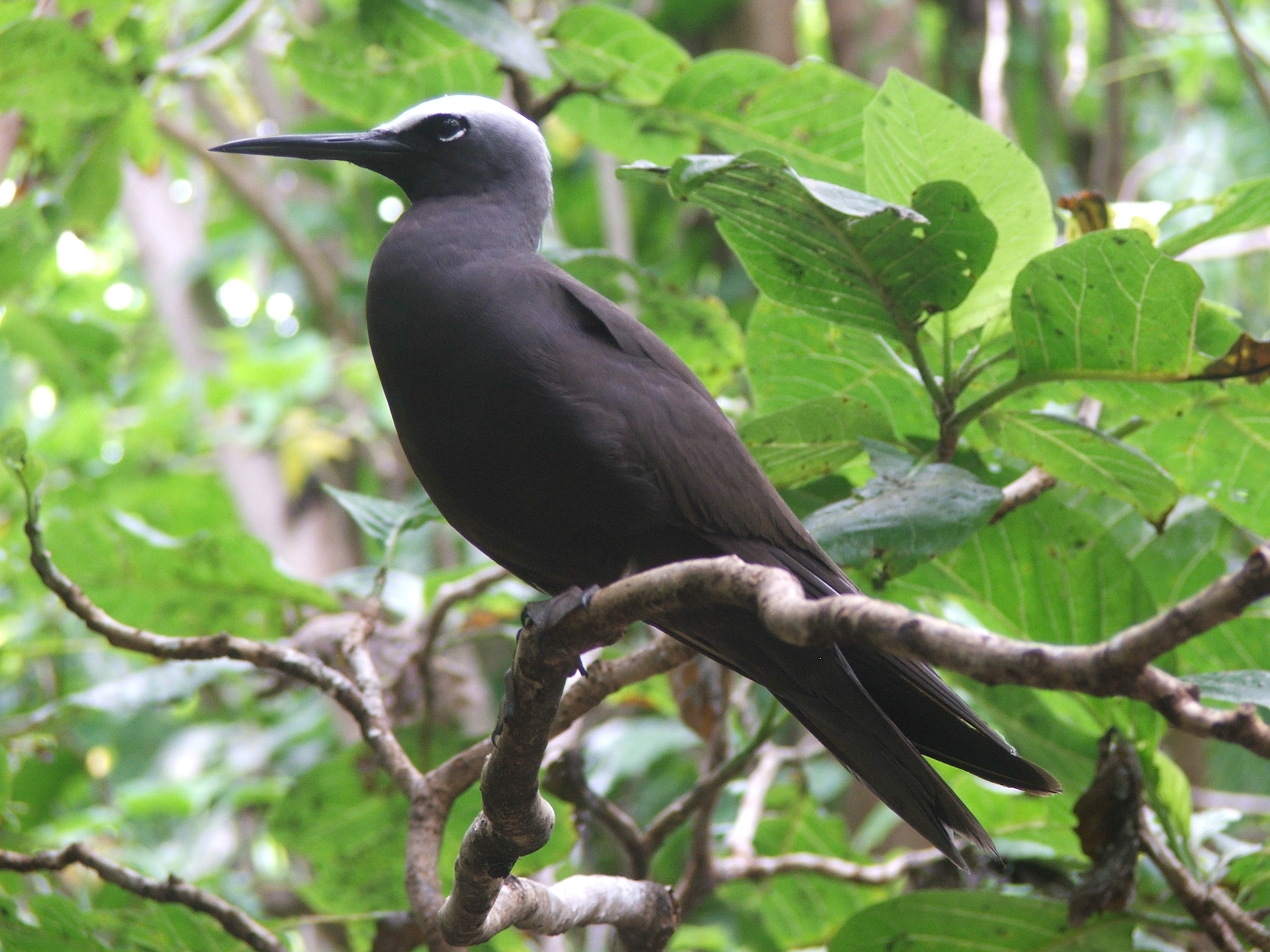
Black noddy

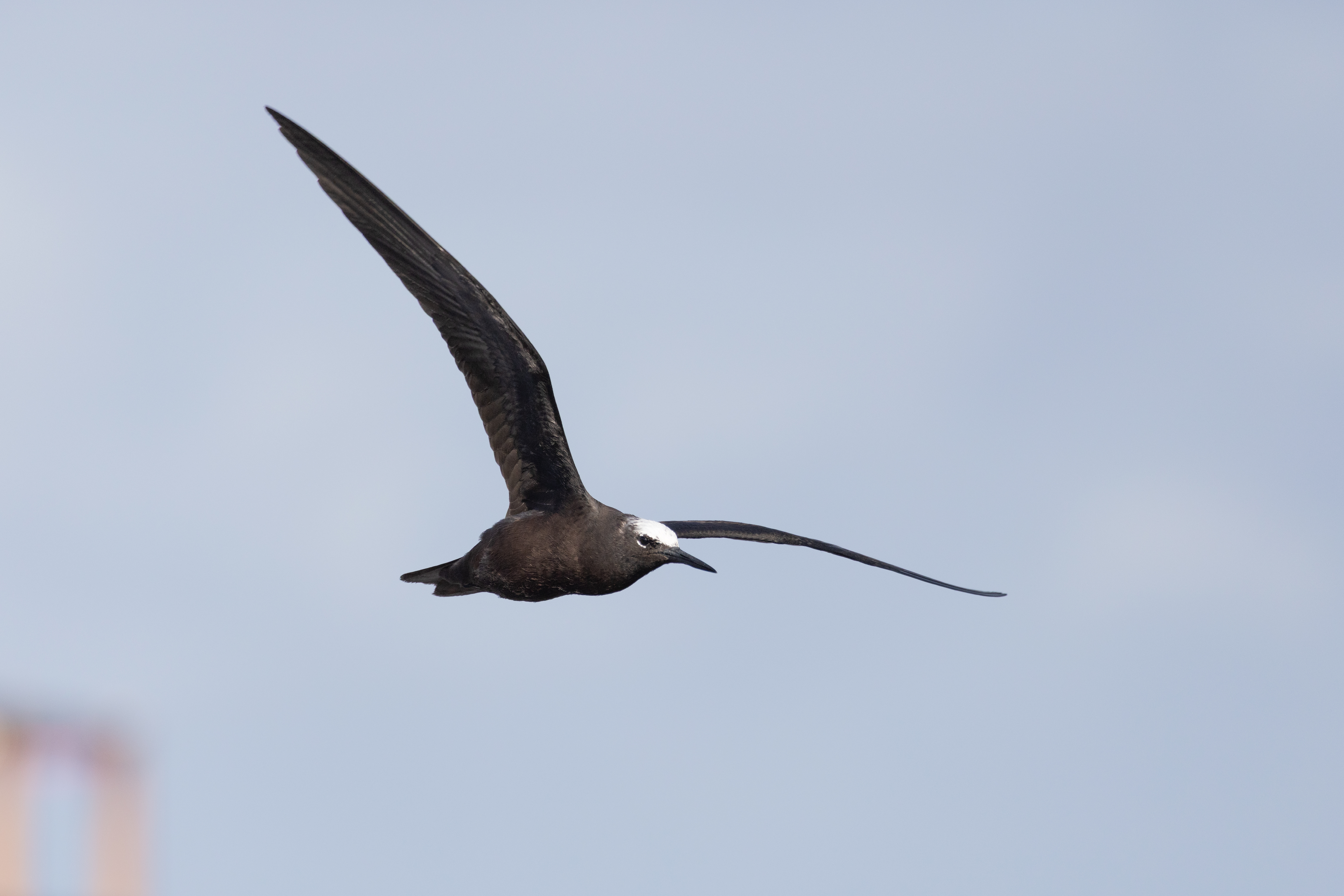
Black noddy in flight

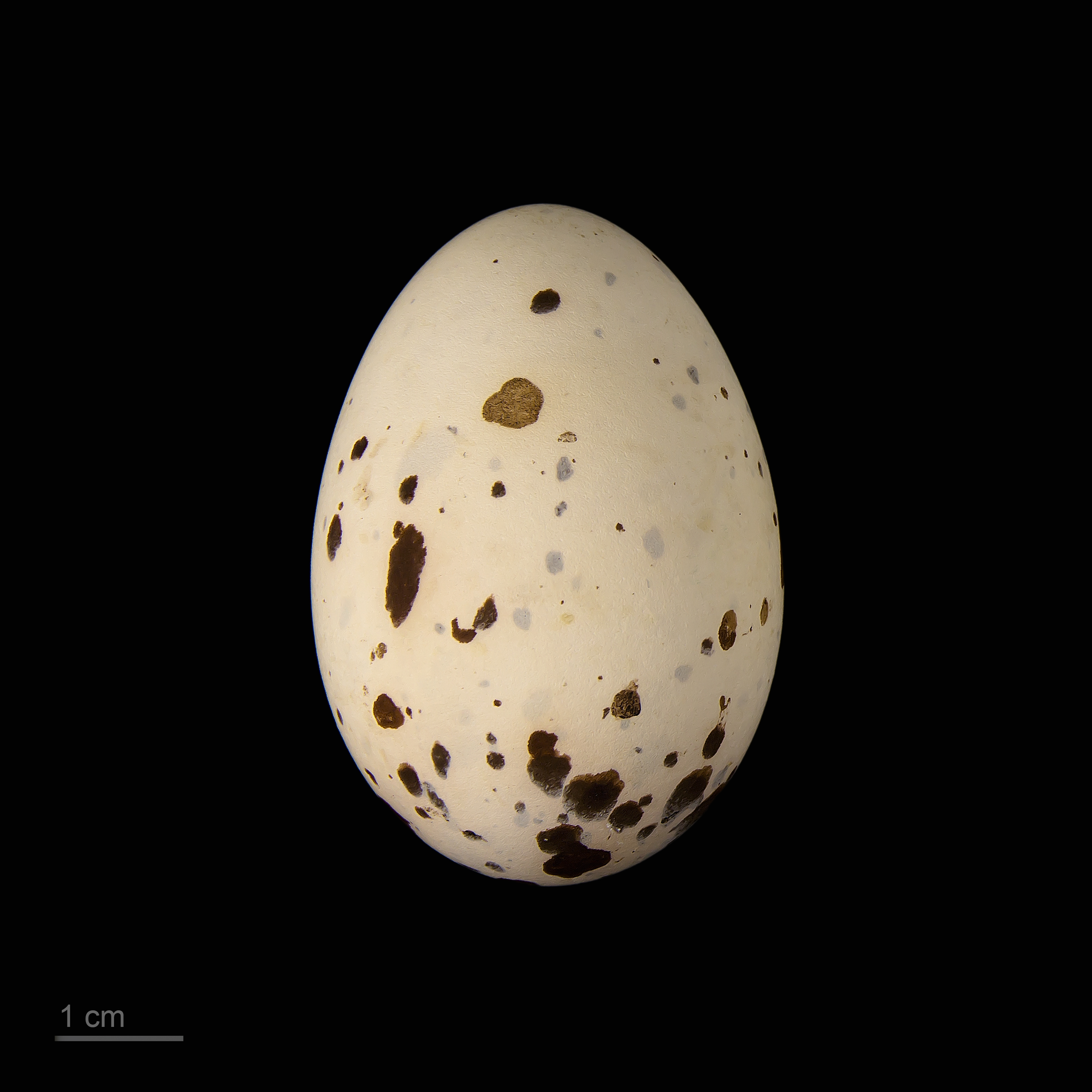
Anous minutus - MHNT

Chick in nest

Chick in nest
