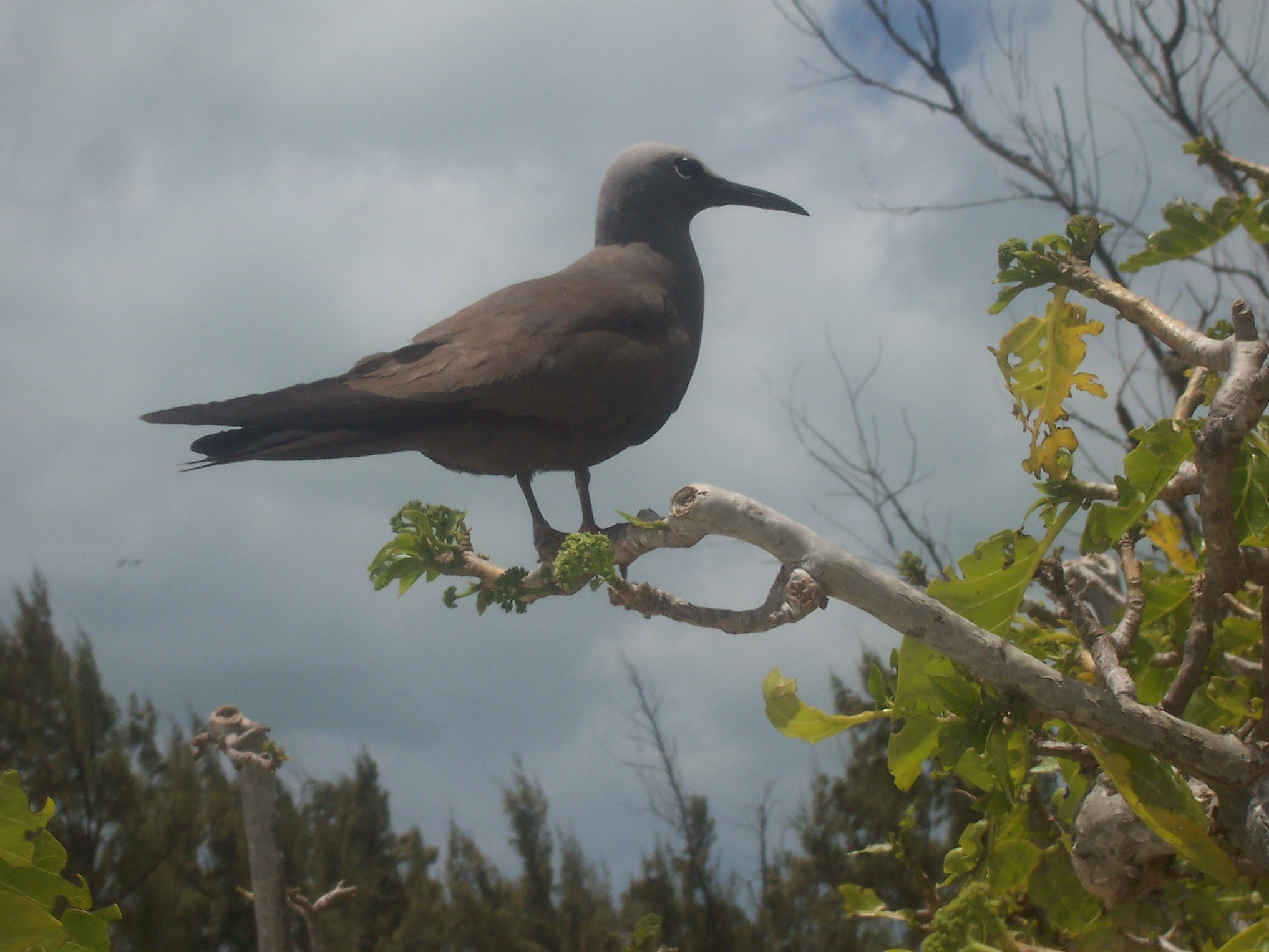

Conservation status
- Least Concern (IUCN 3.1)

Scientific classification
- Kingdom: Animalia
- Phylum: Chordata
- Class: Aves
- Order: Charadriiformes
- Family: Laridae
- Genus: Anous
- Species: A. tenuirostris

Binomial name
- Anous tenuirostris (Temminck, 1823)

Synonyms
- Anous minutus tenuirostris

= Lesser noddy =

Species of bird

The lesser noddy (Anous tenuirostris), also known as the sooty noddy, is a seabird in the family Laridae. It is found near the coastlines of Comoros, Kenya, India, Maldives, Mauritius, Seychelles, Somalia, Sri Lanka and United Arab Emirates.

The lesser noddy was at one time considered as a subspecies of the black noddy (Anous minutus). The close relationship between the two species was confirmed by a molecular phylogenetic study published in 2016.

== Taxonomy ==
The first formal description of the lesser noddy was by the Dutch zoologist Coenraad Jacob Temminck in 1823 under the binomial name Sterna tenuirostris. The genus Anous was introduced by the English naturalist James Francis Stephens in 1826. Anous is Ancient Greek for "stupid" or "foolish". The specific name tenuirostris is from the Latin tenuis for "slender" and -rostris "-billed".

There are two subspecies:

- A. t. tenuirostris (Temminck, 1823) - islands of the west & north Indian Ocean
- A. t. melanops Gould, 1846 - Houtman Abrolhos Islands (Western Australia)

== Description ==
The lesser noddy is 30–34 cm (12–13 in) in length with a wingspan of 58–63 cm (23–25 in) and a weight of 97–120 g (3.4–4.2 oz). The plumage is brownish black. The forehead and crown are lighter in colour. This species is smaller and slightly paler than the similar black noddy and has pale rather than dark lores.

== Ecology ==
Giant tortoises have been observed to hunt the bird on Fregate Island in the Seychelles.
