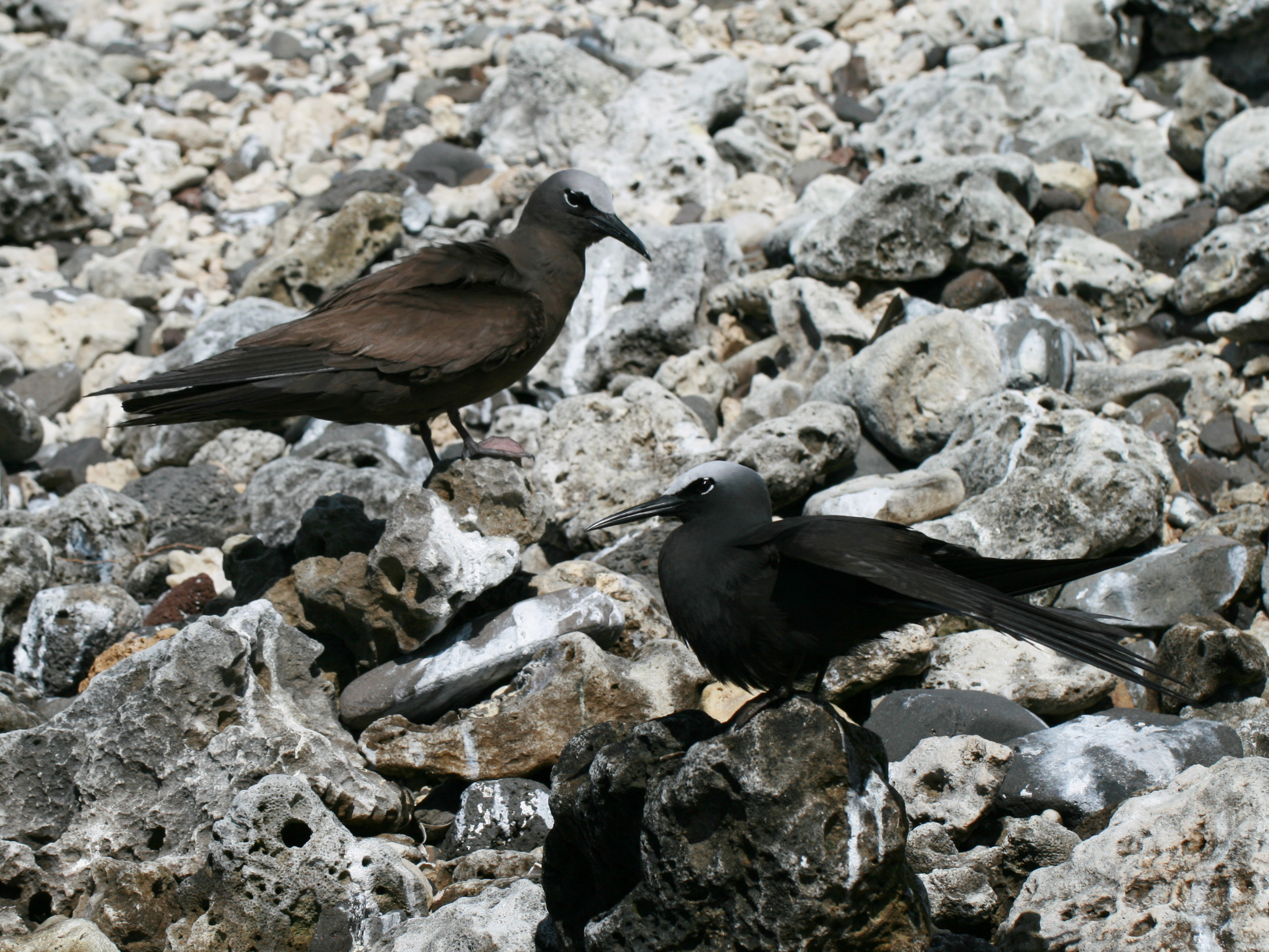
- Brown noddy and black noddy together, Lord Howe Island

Scientific classification
- Kingdom: Animalia
- Phylum: Chordata
- Class: Aves
- Order: Charadriiformes
- Family: Laridae
- Subfamily: Anoinae
- Genus: Anous; Stephens, 1826

Type species
- Anous niger = Sterna stolida Stephens, 1826

Species
- A. stolidus; A. minutus; A. tenuirostris; A. ceruleus; A. albivitta

Synonyms
- Procelsterna Lafresnaye, 1842

= Anous =

Genus of birds

The noddies, forming the genus Anous, are a genus of seabirds in family Laridae which also contains the gulls, terns and skimmers. The genus contains five species.

The noddies inhabit tropical oceans and have a worldwide distribution, ranging from Hawaii to the Tuamotu Archipelago and Australia in the Pacific Ocean, from the Red Sea to the Seychelles and Australia in the Indian Ocean and in the Caribbean to Tristan da Cunha in the Atlantic Ocean. They nest in colonies on cliffs or in short trees or shrubs, seldom on the ground. The female lays one egg in each breeding season. These birds feed on small fish which they catch by dipping their bills beneath the surface while flying; they do not plunge dive.

== Taxonomy ==
The genus was introduced as Anoüs by the English naturalist James Francis Stephens in 1826. Anous is Ancient Greek for "stupid" or "foolish". Noddies are often unwary and were well known to sailors for their apparent indifference to hunters or predators. They find safety in enormous numbers.

A molecular phylogenetic study published in 2007 found that the genus Anous was a sister group to a clade containing the terns, gulls and skimmers. A study of the phylogenetic relationship between the five noddies published in 2016 found that they formed a single clade with the blue noddy and the grey noddy which were at the time in the genus Procelsterna embedded within the three species in Anous. The authors proposed that the noddies should be merged into a single genus Anous and that Procelsterna should be considered as a junior synonym.

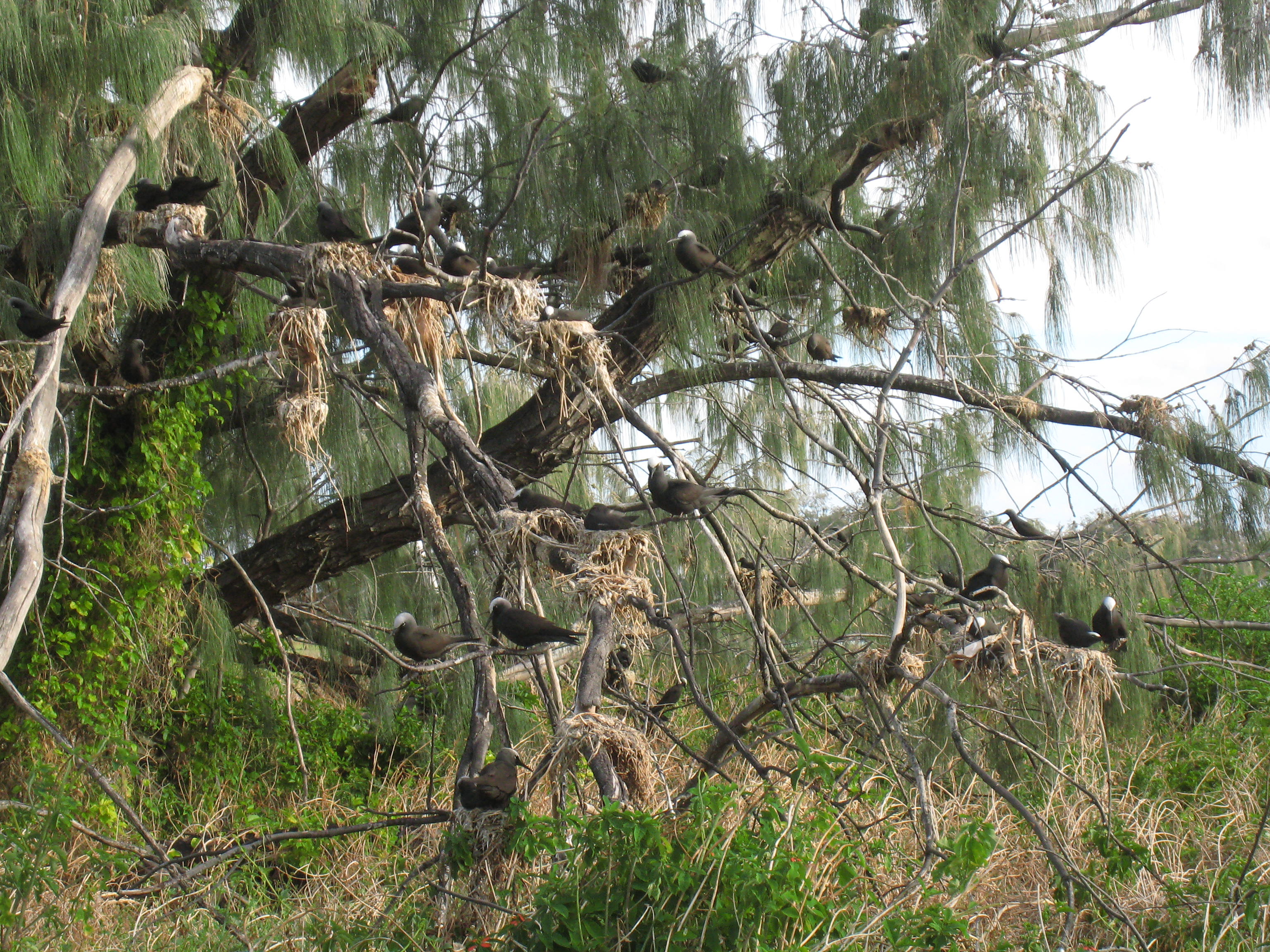
Noddies nesting, Lady Elliott Island, Queensland

Genus Anous – Stephens, 1826 – five species
| Common name | Scientific name and subspecies | Range | Size and ecology | IUCN status and estimated population |
|---|---|---|---|---|
| Brown noddy or common noddy | Anous stolidus (Linnaeus, 1758) Four subspecies: A. s. pileatus (Scopoli, 1786); A. s. galapagensis Sharpe, 1879; A. s. ridgwayi Anthony, 1898; A. s. stolidus (Linnaeus, 1758) | from Hawaii to the Tuamotu Archipelago and Australia in the Pacific Ocean, from the Red Sea to the Seychelles and Australia in the Indian Ocean and in the Caribbean to Tristan da Cunha in the Atlantic Ocean. | Size: Habitat: Diet: | LC |
| Black noddy | Anous minutus Boie, F, 1844 Seven subspecies: A. m. worcesteri (McGregor, 1911); A. m. minutus Boie, 1844; A. m. marcusi (Bryan, 1903); A. m. melanogenys Gray, 1846; A. m. diamesus (Heller and Snodgrass, 1901); A. m. americanus (Mathews, 1912); A. m. atlanticus (Mathews, 1912) | the Pacific Ocean and more scattered across the Caribbean, central Atlantic and in the northeast Indian Ocean. | Size: Habitat: Diet: | LC |
| Lesser noddy, sometimes been considered to be a subspecies of the black noddy. | Anous tenuirostris (Temminck, 1823) Two subspecies: A. t. tenuirostris (Temminck, 1823); A. t. melanops Gould, 1846 | coastlines of Comoros, Kenya, India, Maldives, Mauritius, Seychelles, Sri Lanka and United Arab Emirates. | Size: Habitat: Diet: | LC |
| Blue noddy (formerly placed in Procelsterna) | Anous cerulea (Bennett, FD, 1840) Five subspecies: A. c. saxatilis (Fisher, 1903); A. c. ceruleus (Bennett, 1840); A. c. nebouxi (Mathews, 1912); A. c. teretirostris (Lafresnaye, 1841); A. c. murphyi (Mougin & Naurois, 1981) | American Samoa, the Cook Islands, Fiji, French Polynesia, Kiribati, Marshall Islands, New Caledonia, Samoa, Tonga (Niua), Tuvalu and Hawaii. | Size: Habitat: Diet: | LC |
| Grey noddy (formerly placed in Procelsterna) | Anous albivitta (Bonaparte, 1856) Three subspecies: A. a. albivitta (Bonaparte, 1856); A. a. skottsbergii (Lönnberg, 1921); A. a. imitatrix (Mathews, 1912) | south Pacific Ocean | Size: Habitat: Diet: | LC |
