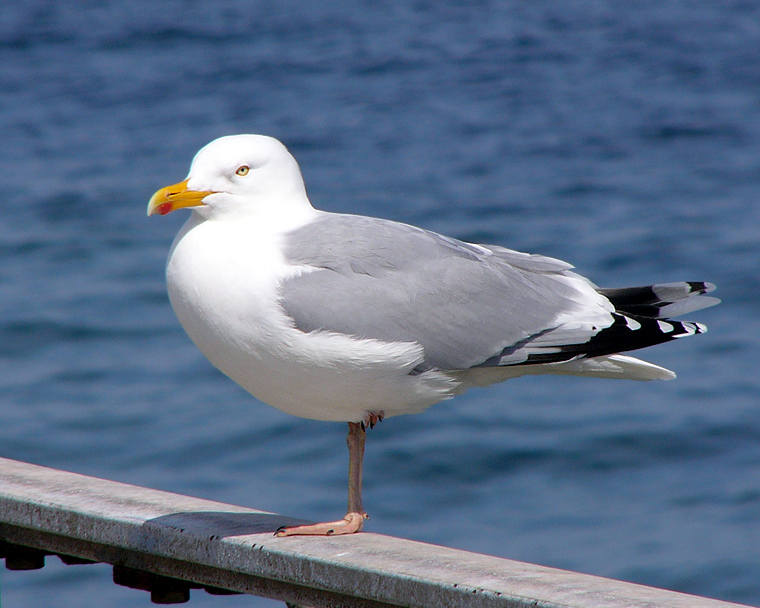
- European herring gull

Scientific classification
- Kingdom: Animalia
- Phylum: Chordata
- Class: Aves
- Order: Charadriiformes
- Suborder: Lari
- Family: Laridae; Rafinesque, 1815

Subfamilies
- Anoinae; Gyginae; Rynchopinae; Larinae; Sterninae

= Laridae =

Family of birds

Laridae is a family of seabirds in the order Charadriiformes that includes the gulls, terns (including white terns), noddies, and skimmers. It includes 105 species arranged into 23 genera. They are an adaptable group of mostly aerial birds found worldwide.

== Taxonomy ==
The family Laridae was introduced (as Laridia) by the French polymath Constantine Samuel Rafinesque in 1815. Historically, Laridae were restricted to the gulls, while the terns were placed in a separate family, Sternidae, and the skimmers in a third family, Rynchopidae. The noddies were traditionally included in Sternidae. In 1990 Charles Sibley and Jon Ahlquist included auks and skuas in a broader family Laridae.

A molecular phylogenetic study by Baker and colleagues published in 2007 found that the noddies in the genus Anous formed a sister group to a clade containing the gulls, skimmers, and the other terns. To create a monophyletic family group, Laridae was expanded to include the genera that had previously been in Sternidae and Rynchopidae.

Baker and colleagues found that the Laridae lineage diverged from a lineage that gave rise to both the skuas (Stercorariidae) and auks (Alcidae) before the end of the Cretaceous in the age of dinosaurs. They also found that the Laridae themselves began expanding in the early Paleocene, around 60 million years ago. The German palaeontologist Gerald Mayr has questioned the validity of these early dates and suggested that inappropriate fossils were used in calibrating the molecular data. The earliest charadriiform fossils date only from the late Eocene, around 35 million years ago.

Anders Ödeen and colleagues investigated the development of ultraviolet vision in shorebirds, by looking for the SWS1 opsin gene in various species; as gulls were the only shorebirds known to have developed the trait. They discovered that the gene was present in the gull, skimmer, and noddy lineages but not the tern lineage. They also recovered the noddies as an early lineage, though the evidence was not strong.

=== Genera ===
The family contains 105 species in 23 genera. For the complete list of species, see the article List of Laridae species.

- Subfamily Rynchopinae (skimmers)
  - Genus Rynchops (3 species)
- Subfamily Gyginae (white terns)
  - Genus Gygis (3 species)
- Subfamily Anoinae (noddies)
  - Genus Anous (5 species)
- Subfamily Sterninae (terns)
  - Genus Onychoprion (4 species)
  - Genus Sternula (7 species)
  - Genus Phaetusa (1 species; large-billed tern)
  - Genus Gelochelidon (2 species)
  - Genus Hydroprogne (1 species; Caspian tern)
  - Genus Larosterna (1 species; Inca tern)
  - Genus Chlidonias (4 species)
  - Genus Sterna (13 species)
  - Genus Thalasseus (7 species)
- Subfamily Larinae (gulls)
  - Genus Creagrus (1 species; swallow-tailed gull)
  - Genus Hydrocoloeus (1 species; little gull)
  - Genus Rhodostethia (1 species; Ross's gull)
  - Genus Rissa (kittiwakes) (2 species)
  - Genus Pagophila (1 species; ivory gull)
  - Genus Xema (1 species; Sabine's gull)
  - Genus Saundersilarus (1 species; Saunders's gull)
  - Genus Chroicocephalus (10 species)
  - Genus Leucophaeus (5 species)
  - Genus Ichthyaetus (6 species)
  - Genus Larus (25 species)

=== Cladogram ===
Left is part of the cladogram of the genera in the order Charadriiformes based on the analysis by Baker and colleagues published in 2007; Right is the result of a comprehensive taxon sampling and fossil calibration of the charadriiform lineages from Černý and Natale (2022), which offers a different arrangement of the five subclades of larids; the skimmers, the white terns, noddies, and sternine terns clustered as a clade sister to the gulls, which were recovered in a basal position. The divergence amongst these five subfamilies occurred throughout 6 to 7 million years during the Priabonian age of the Eocene. This arrangement is also in agreement with the general acceptance from some researchers in that, instead of five subfamilies, there are three. These three would be Larinae (gulls), Rynchopinae (skimmers), and Sterinae (noddies and terns).

Baker et al. 2007

- Laridae
  - Anous – noddies (5 species)
  - - Gygis – white terns (1 species)
    - - Sterninae
        ⊞– terns (41 species)
        ⊟
        - - Phaetusa – large-billed tern
          - Sternula – terns (7 species)
        - - - Larosterna – Inca tern
            - - Gelochelidon – terns (2 species)
              - Hydroprogne – Caspian tern
          - - Chlidonias – marsh terns (4 species)
            - - Thalasseus – crested terns (8 species)
              - - Onychoprion – brown-backed terns (4 species)
                - Sterna – "true" terns (13 species)
      - - Rynchops – skimmers (3 species)
        - Larinae
          ⊞– gulls (31 species)
          ⊟
          - - Creagrus – swallow-tailed gull
            - Rhodostethia – Ross's gull
          - - Xema – Sabine's gull
            - - Pagophila – ivory gull
              - - Larus – "true" gulls (25 species)
                - Rissa – kittiwakes (2 species)

Černý & Natale, 2022

- Laridae
  - Larinae – gulls
  - - Rynchopinae – skimmers
    - - Sterninae
      - - Gyginae – white terns
        - Anoinae – noddies

== Distribution and habitat ==
A generalised nonspecific Laridae in the coat of arms of Ahlainen

The Laridae have spread around the world, and their adaptability has likely been a factor. Most have become much more aerial (preferring flight) than their presumed ancestor, which likely resembled some form of "beachcombing" shorebird. In general, gull diversity is highest in the northern hemisphere at temperate latitudes, but with many exceptions, such as the Ivory Gull, resident in the High Arctic, and the kelp gull, reaching Antarctica. By comparison, skimmers and terns tend to live in warmer temperate, subtropical and tropical regions of the globe, though some (notably the arctic tern) extending to polar latitudes of both hemispheres. During the nonbreeding season, many species fly offshore, often becoming pelagic. In the breeding season, they nest along coastal regions or marshlands.
