= French Frigate Shoals =

Atoll in Hawaii

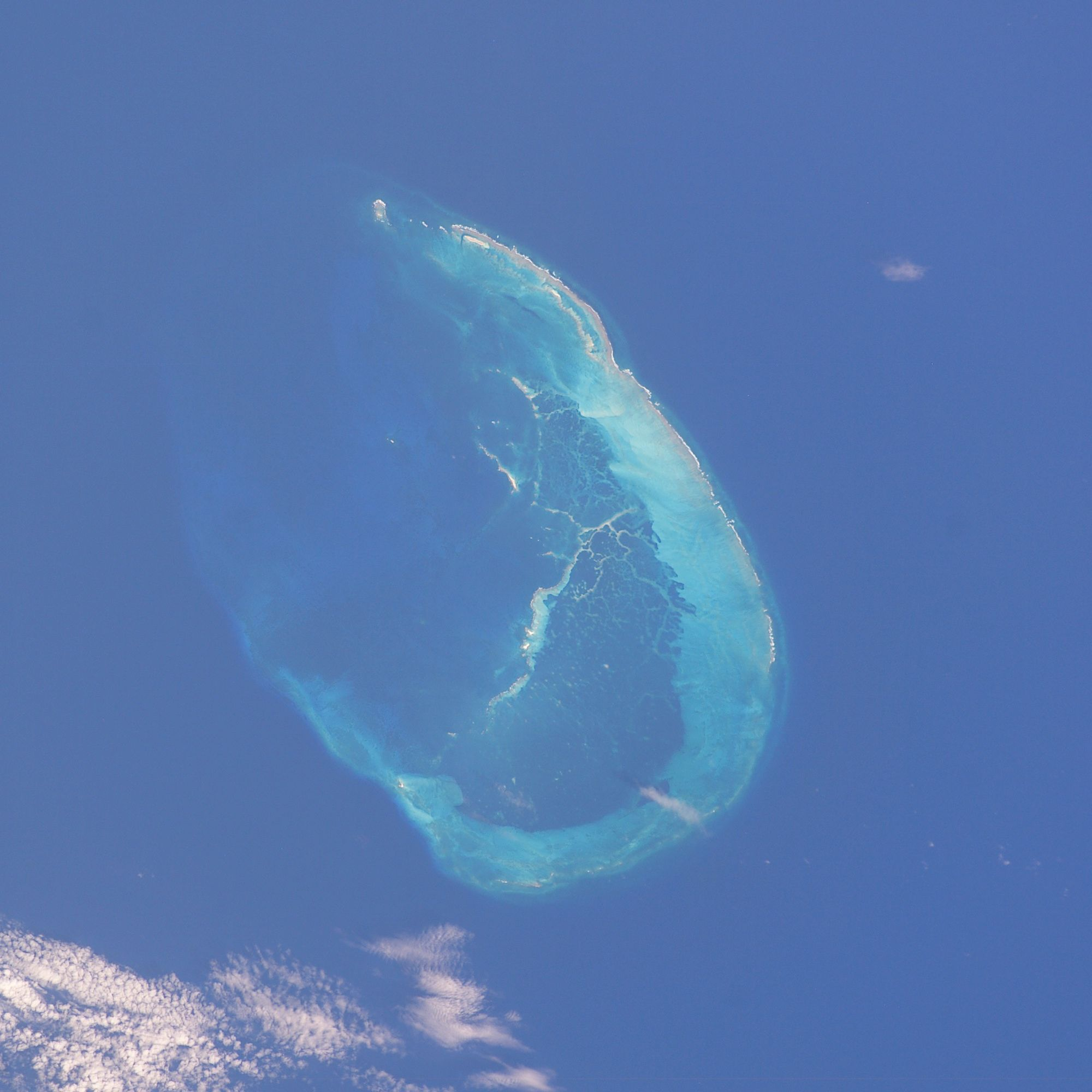
French Frigate Shoals, 2003

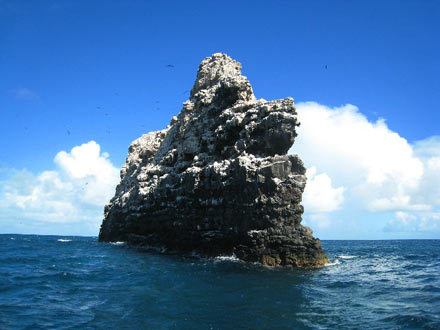
The towering La Pérouse Pinnacle is made of hard volcanic rock and rises 122 ft (37 m)

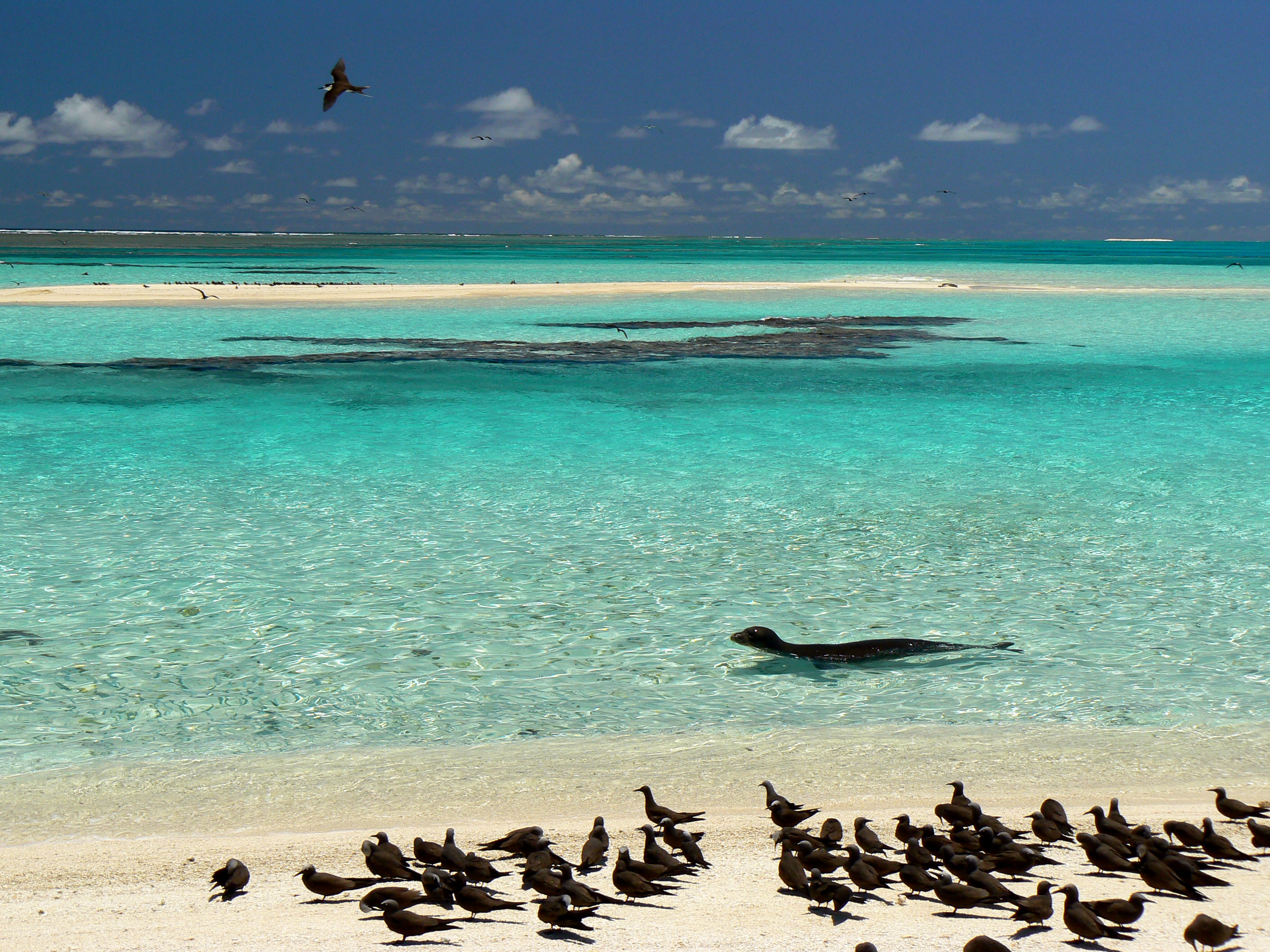
Monk seal and noddy terns at Tern Island, French Frigate Shoals

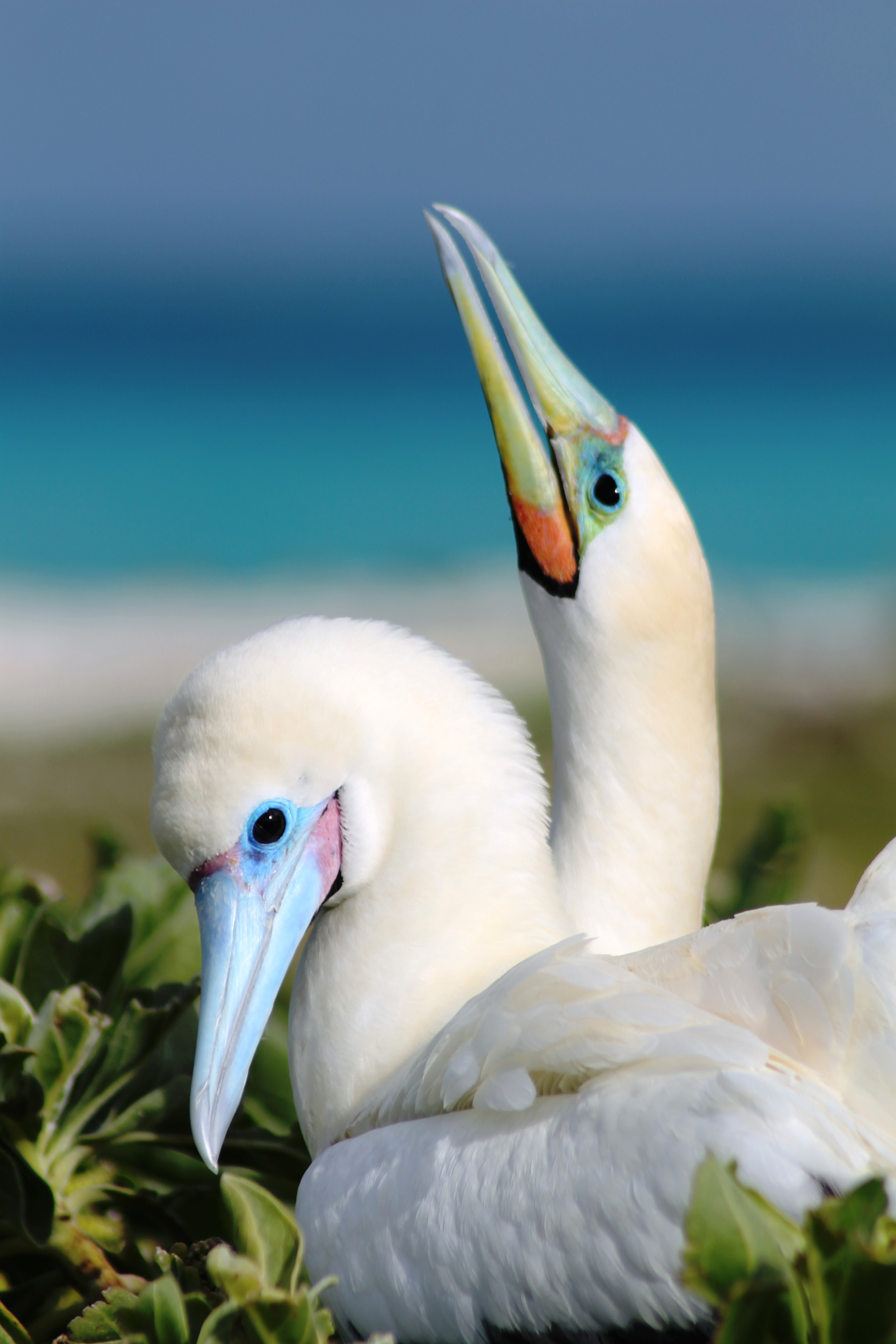
Red-footed Booby on French Frigate Shoals

The French Frigate Shoals (Hawaiian: Kānemilohaʻi) is the largest atoll in the Northwestern Hawaiian Islands, located about 487 nautical miles (902 km; 560 mi) northwest of Honolulu. Its name commemorates French explorer Jean-François de Galaup, comte de Lapérouse, who nearly lost two frigates when attempting to navigate the shoals. It consists of a 20-mile-long (32 km) crescent-shaped reef, twelve sandbars, and the 120-foot-high (37 m) La Perouse Pinnacle, the only remnant of its volcanic origins. The total land area of the islets is 61.508 acres (24.891 ha), while the total coral reef area of the shoals is over 232,000 acres (94,000 ha). Tern Island, with an area of 26.014 acres (10.527 ha), has a landing strip and permanent habitations for a small number of people. It is maintained as a field station in the Hawaiian Islands National Wildlife Refuge by the United States Fish and Wildlife Service. East and Trig, the two largest islands after Tern, have mostly washed away. The islands are surrounded by a coral reef, and the islands themselves are noted breeding ground for turtles, seals, and birds. Habitation is difficult with little vegetation and no fresh water. The French Frigate Shoals are also called Lalo as part of the marine nature reserve, and along with other islands are visited periodically for research. The highest point in the shoals is on La Perouse Pinnacle, which is a volcanic rock that rises 122 ft (37 m) above the surrounding lagoon.

In the 20th century, the shoals were used by the Imperial Japanese Navy as part of an operation to attack Hawaii. Afterwards, a small United States Navy base was established there to prevent it from being used again. After the war it was used by the United States Coast Guard for a LORAN radio navigation station. By the 21st century, it was primarily used for oceanographic and biological study as a nature reserve. Studies at the island helped establish the nature of plastic pollution, and in 2020 one island was designated as contaminated by plastic pollution from the ocean. The reefs are noted for having survived many Pacific storms, although these storms have damaged facilities, wildlife, and significantly reduced the area of some islands.

== History ==
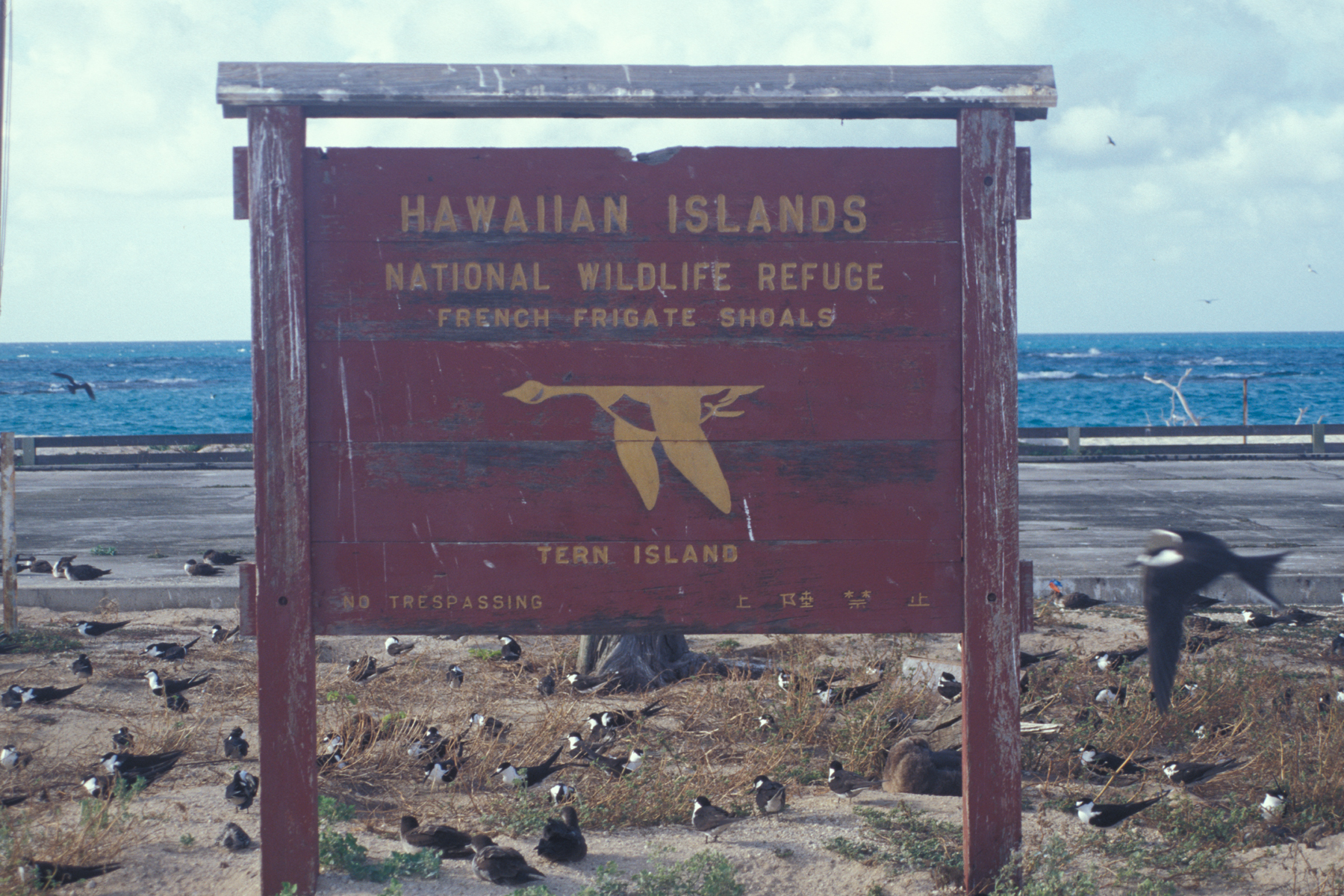
A sign noting Tern Island as part of a United States nature reserve in the French Frigate Shoals

The islands were discovered by the French in the late 18th century and were formally claimed by the United States in 1859 under the Guano Islands Act. The main focus of the USA was to administer the territory as a wildlife refuge, but it became involved in military events during WW2. The shoals were used by Japan as a staging point for their surprise attack on the Hawaiian Islands, but were then occupied by U.S. forces. A few months later, the shoals were again near the front lines in the battle of Midway. After that battle, one island, Tern, was made into an airstrip and base. East Island also had a base. After World War II, the shoals were turned over to Hawaii, and served several purposes. The shoals were used for a LORAN radio location base, and the airstrip was used for fishing. A coast guard base was on the islands until 1979, and then the Fish and Wildlife Service until 2012. One issue was the Pacific storms that affect the islands. In the 21st century, the decayed Tern Island seawall was partially repaired, and in 2018 East Island was nearly washed away. In the 2020s, the shoals are a noted nature reserve, regularly visited for research on marine life, including coral, sharks, fish, seals, sea turtles, and many types of birds. There is also marine archeology conducted on sea wrecks, including a rare whaling vessel wreck.

=== Overview and early history ===
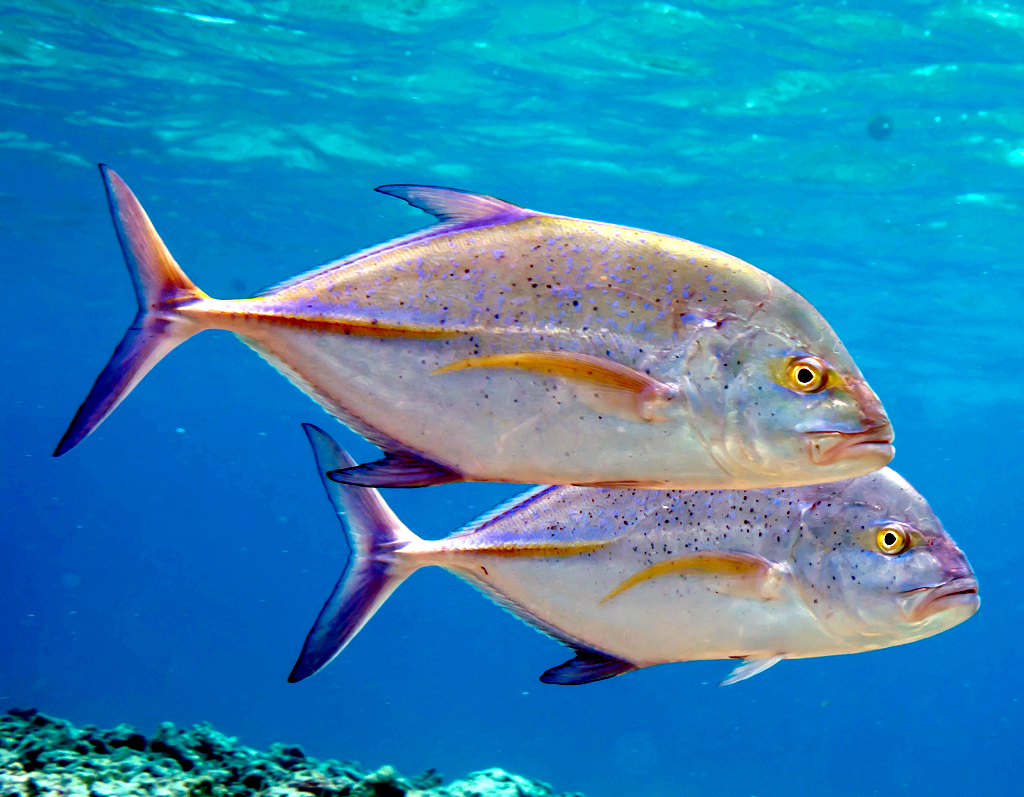
Blue trevally swim in the French Frigate Shoals

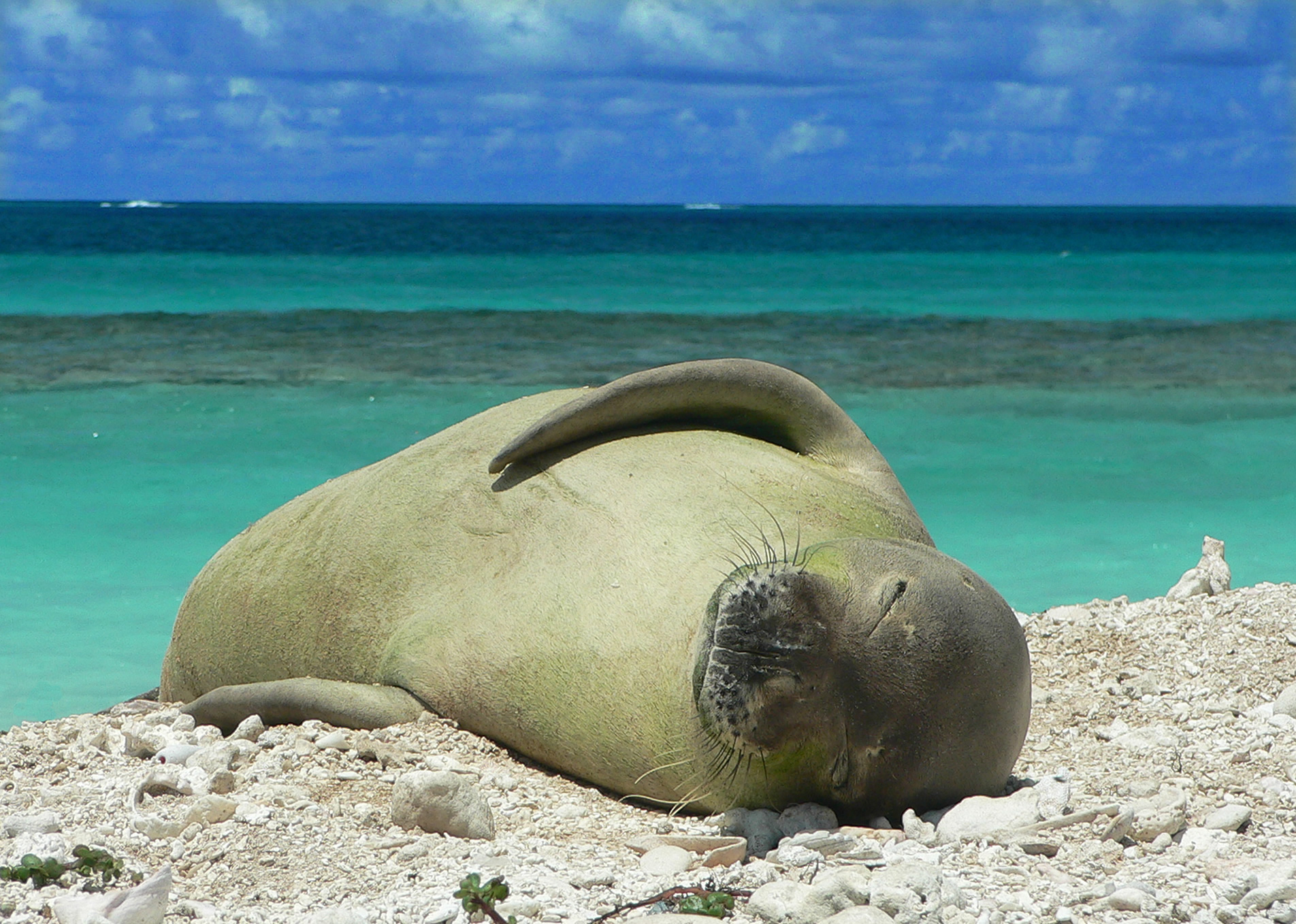
Hawaiian monk seal takes a rest on East Island

Although there is no evidence of extensive human activity or presence in the area, the earliest human visitors to the French Frigate Shoals probably came from the main Hawaiian Islands, which were settled by Polynesians between 1100 and 1300 AD.

The Hawaiian island chain lay outside the routes followed by early European explorers, and it was not until Jean-François de Galaup, comte de Lapérouse's near-disastrous discovery that the shoals were known to the outside world. La Pérouse, aboard the frigate Boussole, was sailing westward from Monterey en route to Macau. During the night of 6 November 1786, sailors sighted breakers directly in their path, about a thousand feet ahead. Both the Boussole and her companion vessel, the frigate Astrolabe, were immediately brought about, passing within a few hundred feet of the breakers. At daybreak, the ships returned and mapped the southeastern half of the atoll, as well as finding the rock that would later be named after La Pérouse. La Pérouse named the shoals Basse des Frégates Françaises, the "Shoal of the French Frigates".

The expedition went on to discover the nearby Necker Island. His ships were Astrolabe (under command of Fleuriot de Langle) and the Boussole. La Pérouse was on a mission of exploration from the French Academy of Sciences, and they made many discoveries in across the Pacific. The expedition was lost at sea in 1788 while still on the expedition, but was able to send its logs home.

In 1823, the whaling ship Two Brothers sank near Shark Island. This wreck was discovered in the early 21st century.

In 1841 the French Frigate Shoals were visited by the United States Exploring Expedition authorized by President Andrew Jackson. The shoals were visited by the sailing ships, brigs Oregon and Porpoise.

In 1859 the barque Gambia (a) and clipper Modern Times visited the French Frigate Shoals. That same year the whaler South Seaman wrecked on the shoals. About a dozen of its crew were rescued by another vessel in the area, but about 30 were left on the island until another ship could retrieve them. In December 1859 the brig Wanderer was also lost on the shoals, but the crew was rescued.

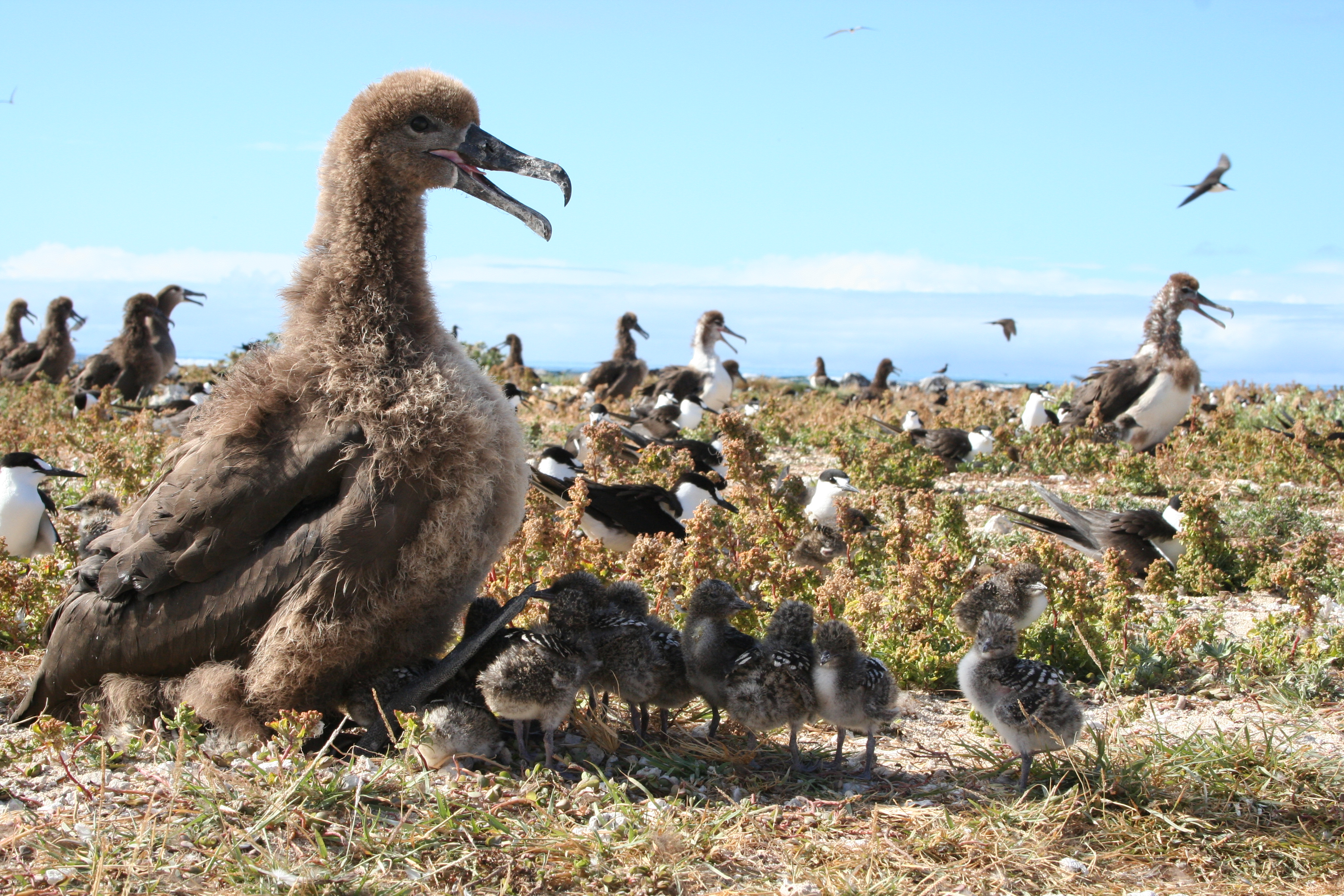
Black-footed Albatross Phoebastria nigripes and Sooty Terns Onychoprion fuscatus

During the late 19th century American and European companies became interested in the possibility of mining guano in the Hawaiian Islands. U.S. Navy Lieutenant John M. Brooke, sailing on the naval schooner USS Fenimore Cooper, formally took possession of French Frigate Shoals for the United States on 14 January 1859, in accordance with the Guano Islands Act. In 1894, French Frigate Shoals, Kure Atoll, Midway Atoll, and Pearl and Hermes Reef were leased for 25 years by the Republic of Hawaii to the North Pacific Phosphate and Fertilizer Company; however, guano and phosphate deposits at French Frigate Shoals were found to be impractical to mine. The Republic did not formally claim possession of the shoals until 13 July 1895.

French Frigate Shoals was included among the lands and waters acquired by the United States on 7 July 1898, when Hawaii became a United States territory. In 1909 it was made a part of the Hawaiian Islands Bird Reservation.

In 1896 the seal hunting ship Mattie E. Dyer wrecked on the shoals, and the crew abandoned ship in whaleboats. There was no water on the island they landed on among the shoals so they sailed the boats to Hawaii.

=== Early 20th century ===
In 1902 the Albatross expedition visited the French Frigate Shoals and studied the birds. Several naturalists visited and published an ornithological report.

In 1903 the ship Connétable de Richemont wrecked on the shoals, but its crew escaped on boats to mainland Hawaii.

In 1909 the French Frigate Shoals became part of the Hawaiian Island Reservation and administered by the United States Department of Agriculture.

In 1917 the four-masted schooner Churchill wrecked on the French Frigate Shoals. The crew of 12 survived.

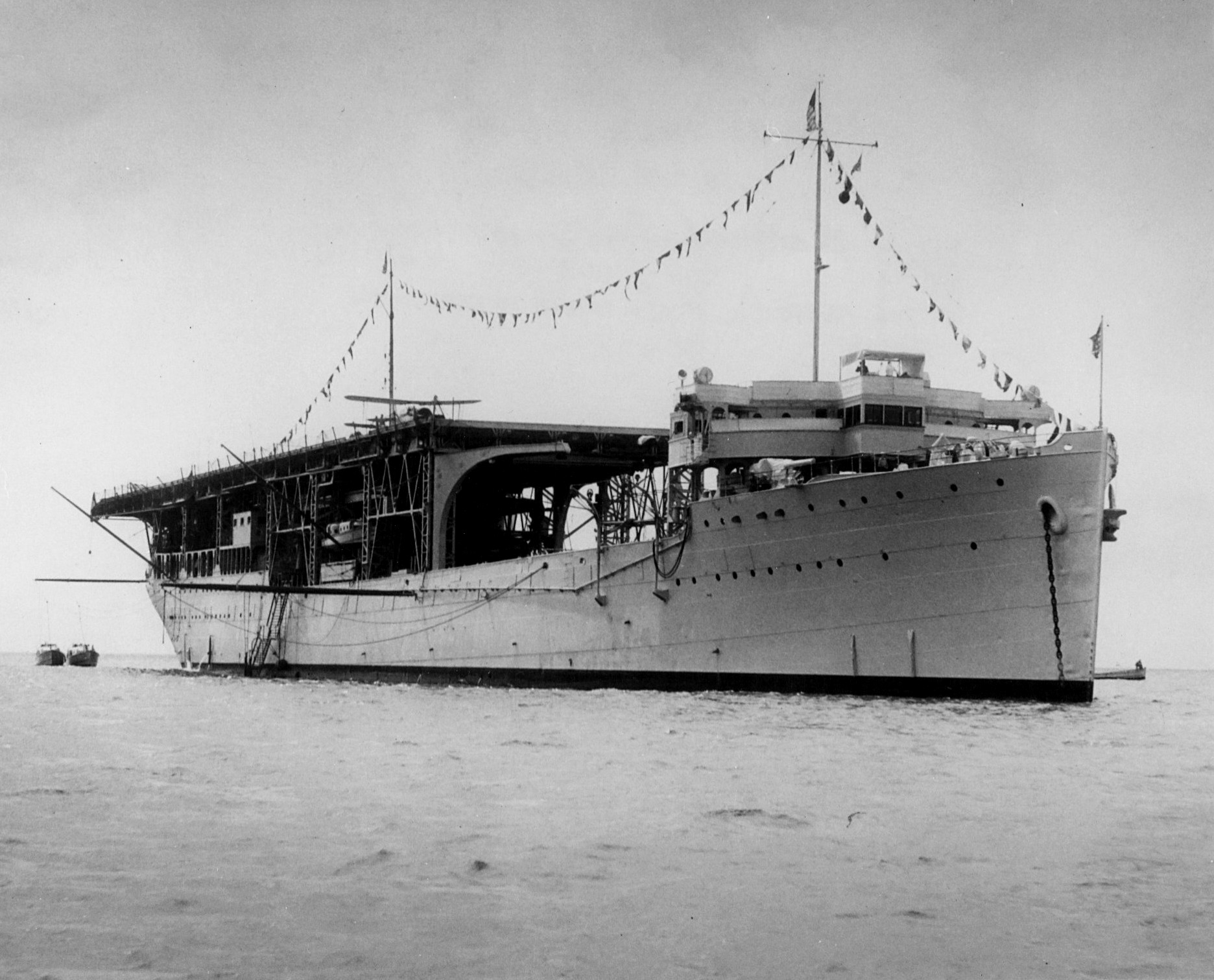
USS Langley (AV-3) at French Frigate Shoals in 1937

The Tanager Expedition visited the French Frigate Shoals in 1923 and did a survey of the islands.

The United States Revenue Cutter Service sent many patrols to this region in the early 20th century. The U.S. Revenue Cutter Service vessel USRC Thetis visited the French Frigate Shoals in 1912, 1914, 1915, and 1916. In 1918 the shoals were inspected by the United States Navy ship USS Hermes. Shoal inspections in the 1920s and 1930s include ones by USS Pelican in 1924, USRC Itasca in 1931 and 1934, and the United States Coast Guard vessel USCGC Reliance in 1936.

In 1932, the minesweeper USS Quail visited the shoals, anchoring near East Island. A seaplane tendered from the ship took some of the first aerial photographs of the islands.

In 1936, the seaplane tender USS Wright came to the shoals, and established a base on East Island to support a month of seaplane operations.

In 1937, a member of a USN seaplane crew died at the French Frigate Shoals while his PK-1 seaplane was moored there.

=== World War II ===
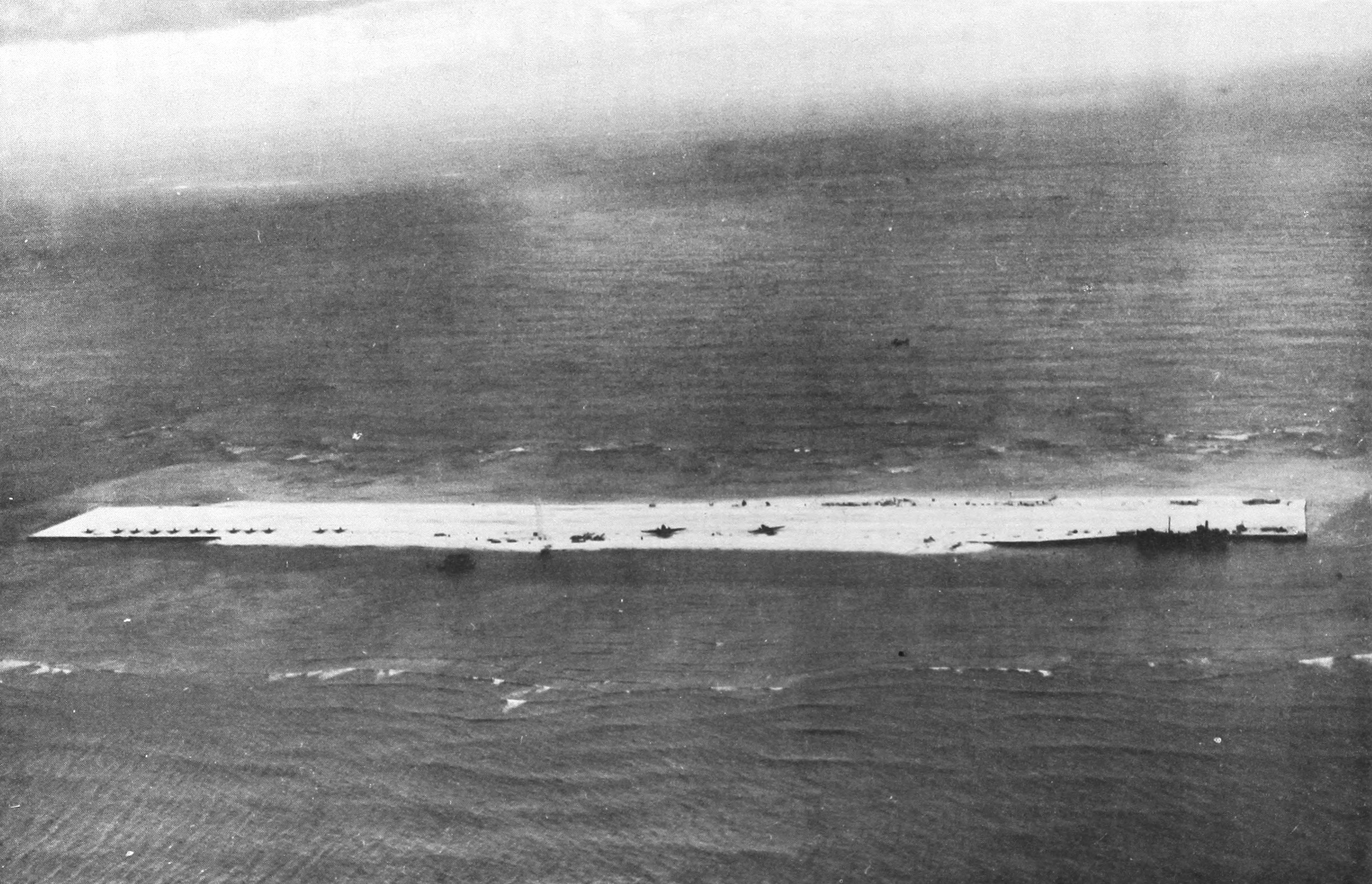
Tern Island was made into an airstrip base, the famous "coral carrier", after the Battle of Midway in World War II

In March 1942, Imperial Japanese Navy planners took advantage of the shoal's isolation to use its protected waters as an anchorage and refueling point for the long-range flying boats employed in Operation K, a reconnaissance operation that aimed to disrupt salvage and repair operations following the attack on Pearl Harbor. The operation involved three IJN submarines and two Kawanishi H8K flying boats. It was the combat debut of the H8K. The H8K flying boats stopped to refuel in the shoals from two of the submarines, I-15 and I-19. After the operation, United States Pacific Fleet Commander Chester W. Nimitz ordered a permanent United States Navy presence at the shoals.

Some U.S. Navy ships that were stationed at the Shoals in 1942 were the seaplane tender USS Thornton and the mine warfare ship USS Preble. Over twenty flying boats were operated from the French Frigate Shoals during World War II, typically flying reconnaissance missions.

After the Battle of Midway, the United States Navy built a naval air station on Tern Island, enlarging the island sufficiently to support a 3,300-foot (1,000 m) landing strip, increasing its land area to 26.014 acres (10.527 ha). The station's main function was as an emergency landing site for planes flying between Hawaii and Midway Atoll. French Frigate Shoals Airport comprises what remains of the original naval air station.

The ship YHB-10 arrived at French Frigate Shoals in August 1942, carrying staff to help establish the naval base there. It was moored on the north side of Tern Island and used as a floating barracks. On March 26, 1945, it was sunk as a torpedo practice target near the shoals.

=== United States Coast Guard station ===
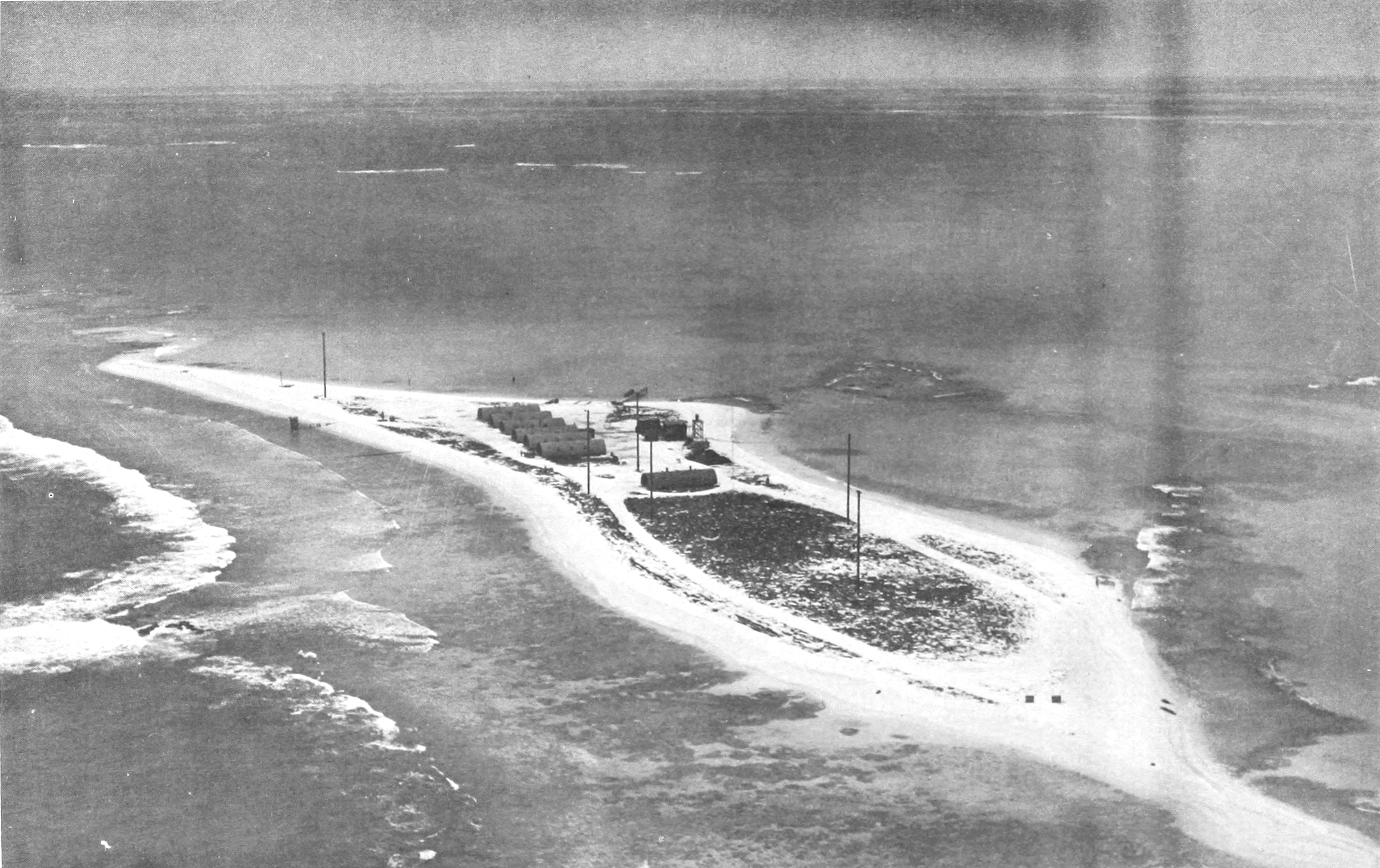
The Coast Guard LORAN base on East Island, 1945

The United States Coast Guard operated a LORAN navigation station on East Island until 1952, and Tern Island until 1979. At any one time, 15 to 20 military personnel were billeted to French Frigate Shoals. As with all Coast Guard isolated duty stations, the Service attempted to fill open billets with volunteers. If there were no volunteers for essential billets, the Coast Guard would at times fill open slots as a disciplinary measure.

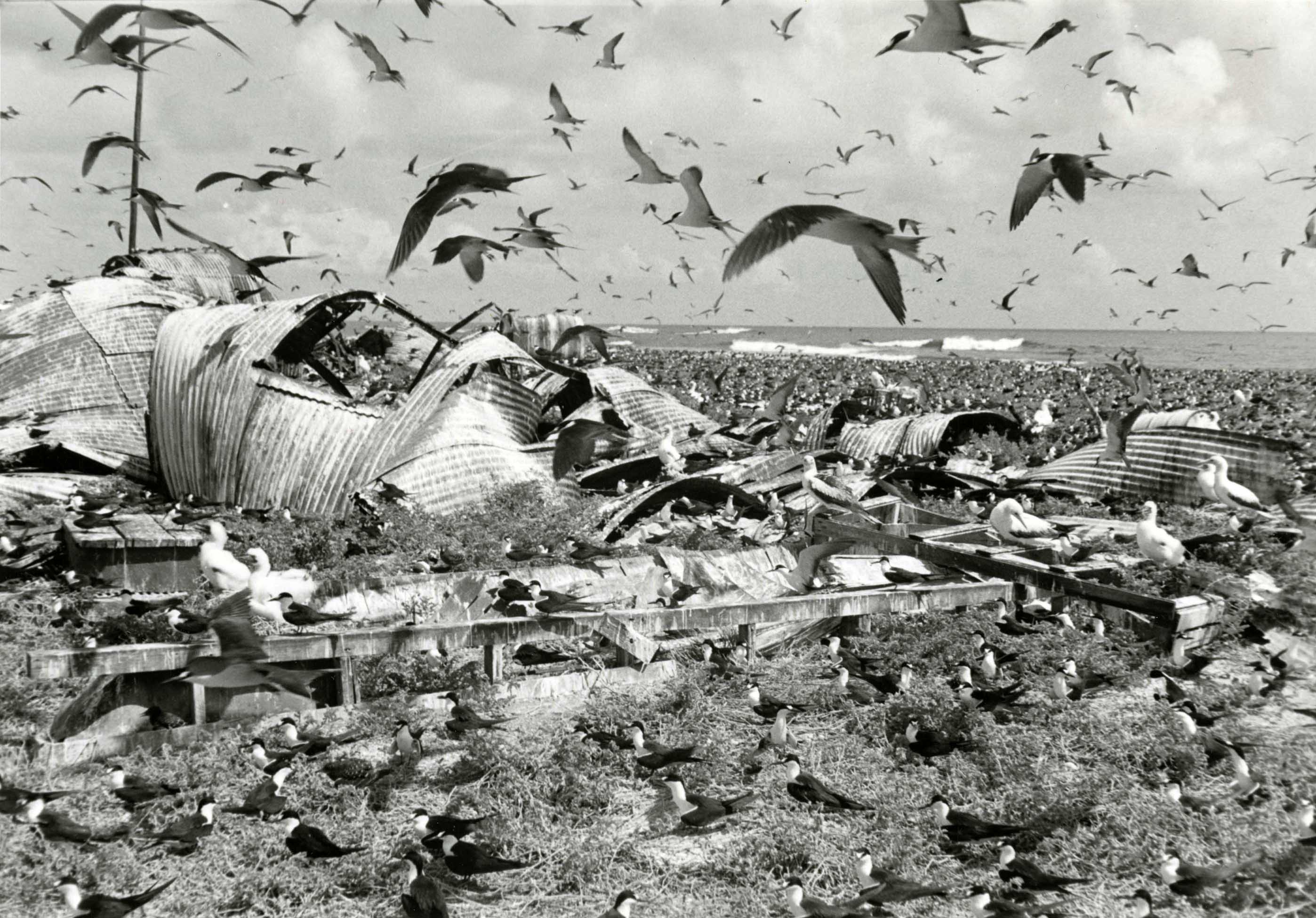
Birds and damaged buildings at East Island in June 1966

The LORAN station commanding officer was typically a lieutenant junior grade officer, the executive officer a chief petty officer enlisted rank. The station was staffed with USCG enlisted specialists such as Radioman, Electronic Technician, Fireman, Boatswain's Mates, plus seaman or seaman apprentice nonrated service members (assigned to perform maintenance and other generalized duties).

The Coast Guard designated the French Frigate Shoals billet as "isolated duty", thereby entitling Coast Guard members serving at the station to additional monthly "isolated duty pay". Because of the billet's remoteness, a duty term was limited to one year.

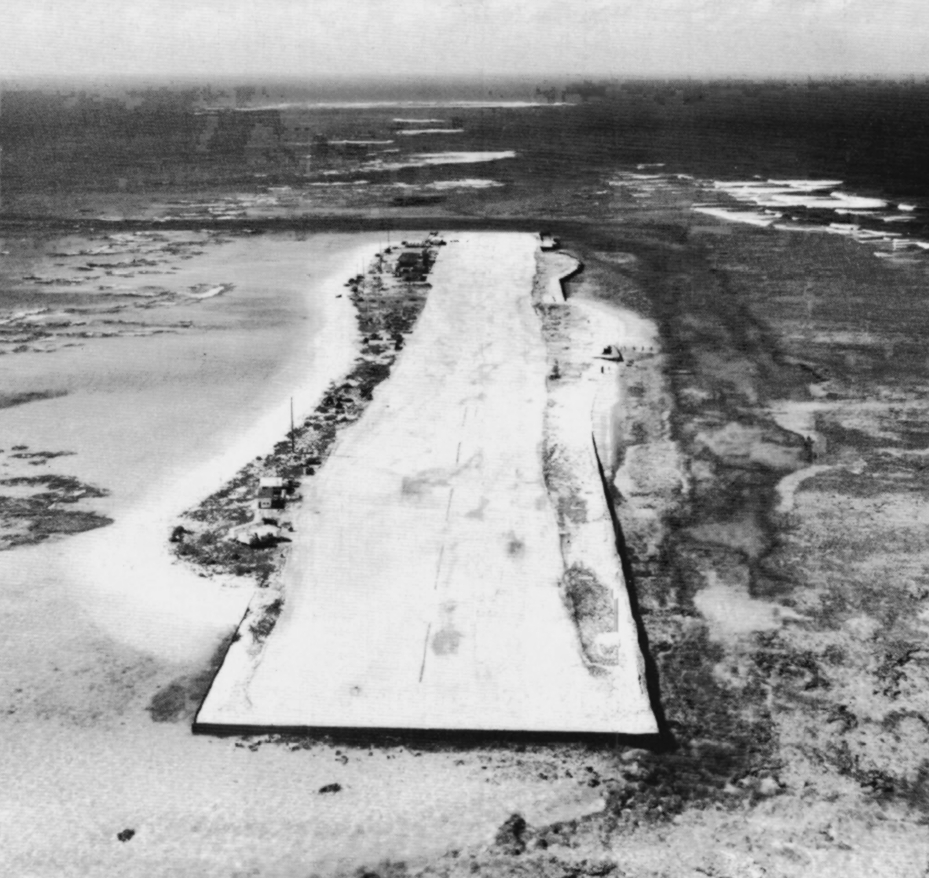
Tern Island airstrip in 1966

In December 1969, a tsunami devastated the islands, forcing the crew on Tern Island to evacuate the station, which was destroyed. The station was off the air from 1 to 6 December. The USCGC Kukui (WAK-186) was sent to help support repairs.

Whale-Skate Island washed away in the 1990s.

=== 21st century ===
A United States Fish and Wildlife Service field station was active at the island from 1979 to 2012. In 2000, the atoll became part of the Northwestern Hawaiian Islands Coral Reef Ecosystem Reserve, which was incorporated into the Northwestern Hawaiian Islands National Monument in 2006. In 2009 the islands were evacuated during the approach of Hurricane Neki by landing a USCG C-130 on Tern's coral airstrip.

In 2000/1 the United States Congress approved US$10 million to repair the islands, one of the major issues being that the double-wall steel sea wall around Tern Island had deteriorated and was trapping sea life such as seals. By 2004, the Army Corps of Engineers, with additional funding from the Fish & Wildlife Service, conducted a US$12 million project to repair the seawall and conduct other maintenance. This project repaired 1200 feet of seawall. The project was managed by the U.S. Army Corps of Engineers. However, the budget was only enough for about half of what was needed thus leaving sections unrepaired.

In 2005, a wreck was found, possibly the wreck of the schooner Churchill, which ran aground at the French Frigate Shoals in 1917. Maritime archeologists returned in 2007 and 2008 to try and identify the wreck site, which included items like anchors and equipment.

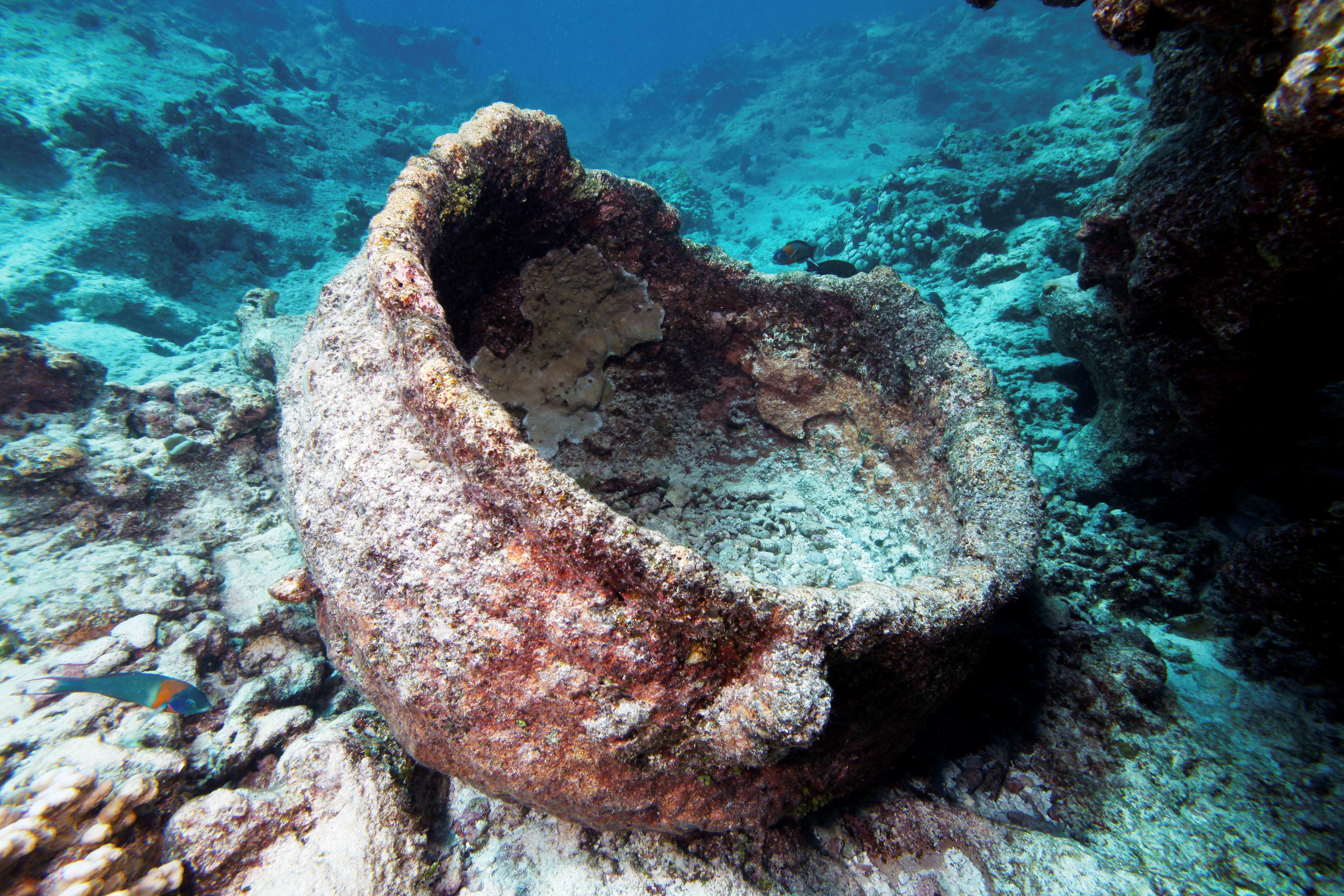
A pot from the shipwreck of Two Brothers

In 2008 a shipwreck of a 19th-century whaling ship was found near Shark island. The wreck was identified in 2011 as the whaling sailing ship Two Brothers. The ship wrecked the night of February 11, 1823, under the command of Captain George Pollard Jr. (of Essex fame). The crew was able to be rescued by another whaling ship they were on the voyage with, Martha. Captain Pollard is noted for inspiring the novel Moby Dick when his sailing ship the Essex was rammed by a whale. The discovery was important in the field of maritime archeology for various reasons; there is only one surviving whaling ship from this period, and the wreck of the Two Brothers had been lost for nearly two centuries. The finding of the Two Brothers was the first discovery of a wrecked Nantucket whaling ship.

At least five other vessels are recorded to have wrecked on the French Frigate Shoals between 1859 and 1917.

In December 2012, five people were evacuated from the FFS in advance of a severe storm. They departed by boat from Tern Island and travelled back to Honolulu. The storm caused damage to some of the facilities on the island including the barracks. The US Fish & Wildlife Service closed its field station on Tern Island at the end of 2012. Since then, the island has only been visited periodically.

In 2016, a National Oceanic and Atmospheric Administration ship conducted a 33-day survey expedition of the French Frigate Shoals, including reporting on the condition of the reefs.

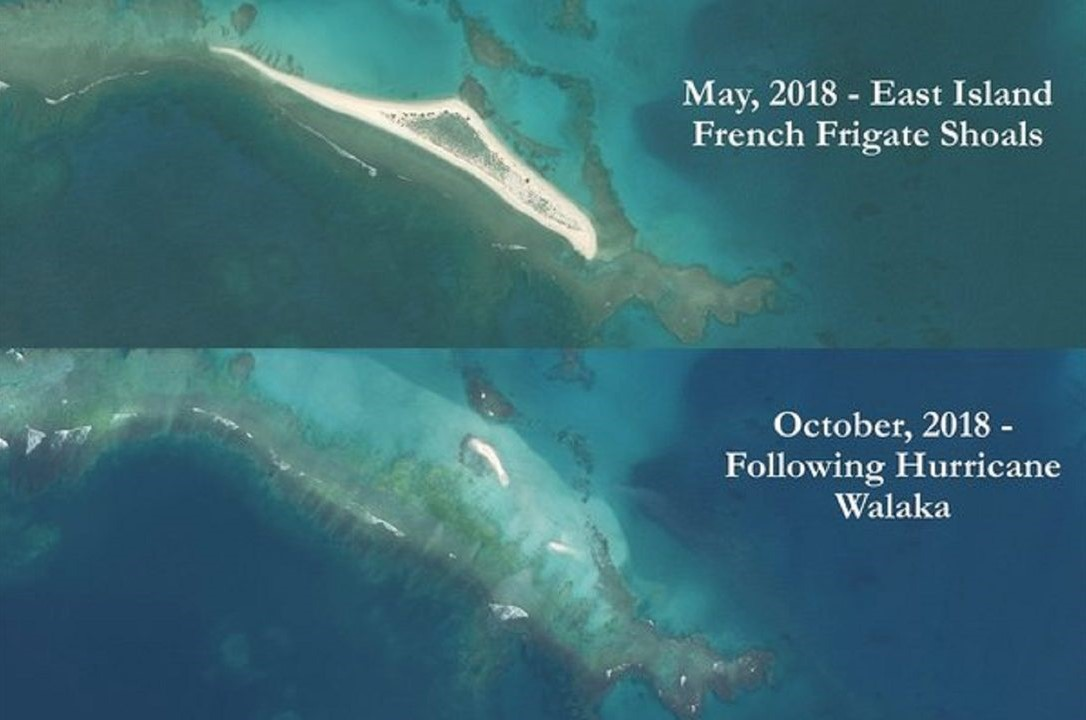
Infographic illustrating the damage to the shoal's East Island

In October 2018, Hurricane Walaka eroded away most of East Island, the second largest island of the French Frigate Shoals. About 11 acres of East Island were eliminated, which was thought to be caused by the large storm surge that Walaka caused in the area. The hurricane damaged many of the shoal's islands, and underwater many coral reefs were stripped of sea life. Following the destruction of East Island, researchers have been forced to make camp at the smaller Tern Island when conducting field work in the French Frigate Shoals.

In 2020, the Papahanaumokuakea Marine Debris Project, working in conjunction with government agencies, removed tens of thousands of pounds of debris from the region. By September, 2024, the island had recovered to about 60% of its original size.

In the 2020s, concerns about the decaying seawall on Tern Island trapping turtles and seals were brought to light. The double steel wall on the island has not been maintained; as a result, holes have rusted out.

In 2023 the NOAA visited the island for a research expedition along with other islands of the chain. The researchers camped on Tern Island and took trips to East Island where many turtle breeding grounds were located.

== Geology and ecology ==
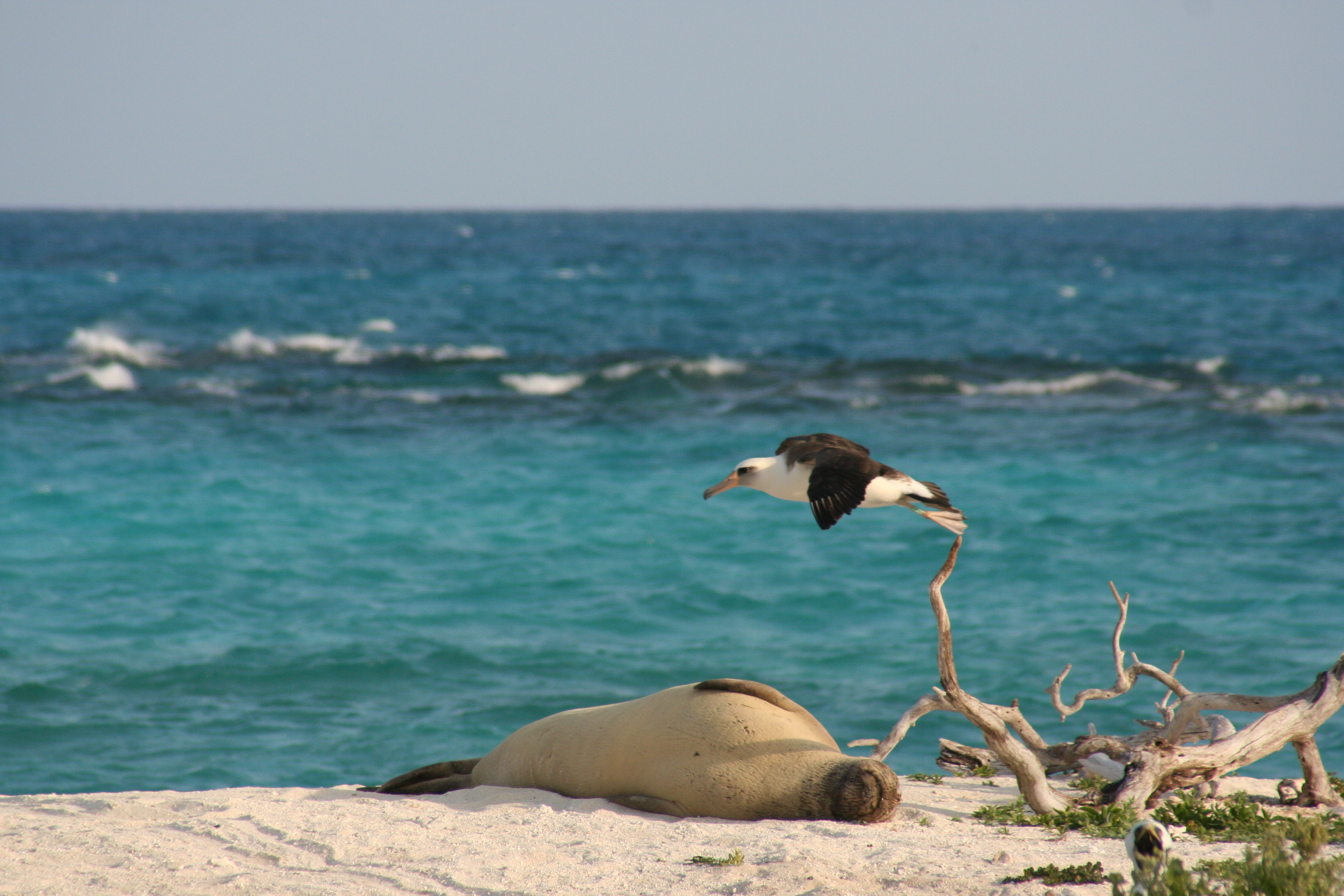
The atoll is an important refuge for Hawaiian monk seals and Laysan albatrosses

La Pèrouse Pinnacle, a rock outcrop in the center of the atoll, is the oldest and most remote volcanic rock in the Hawaiian chain. It stands 120 feet (37 m) tall and is surrounded by coral reefs. Because of its shape, the pinnacle is often mistaken for a ship from a distance.

Whale-Skate Island is a submerged island in the French Frigate Shoals. These islands suffered considerably from erosion starting in the 1960s, and by the late 1990s, Whale-Skate Island was completely washed over.

The reef system at French Frigate Shoals supports 41 species of stony corals, including several species that are not found in the main Hawaiian Island chain. More than 600 species of marine invertebrates, many of which are endemic, are found there as well.

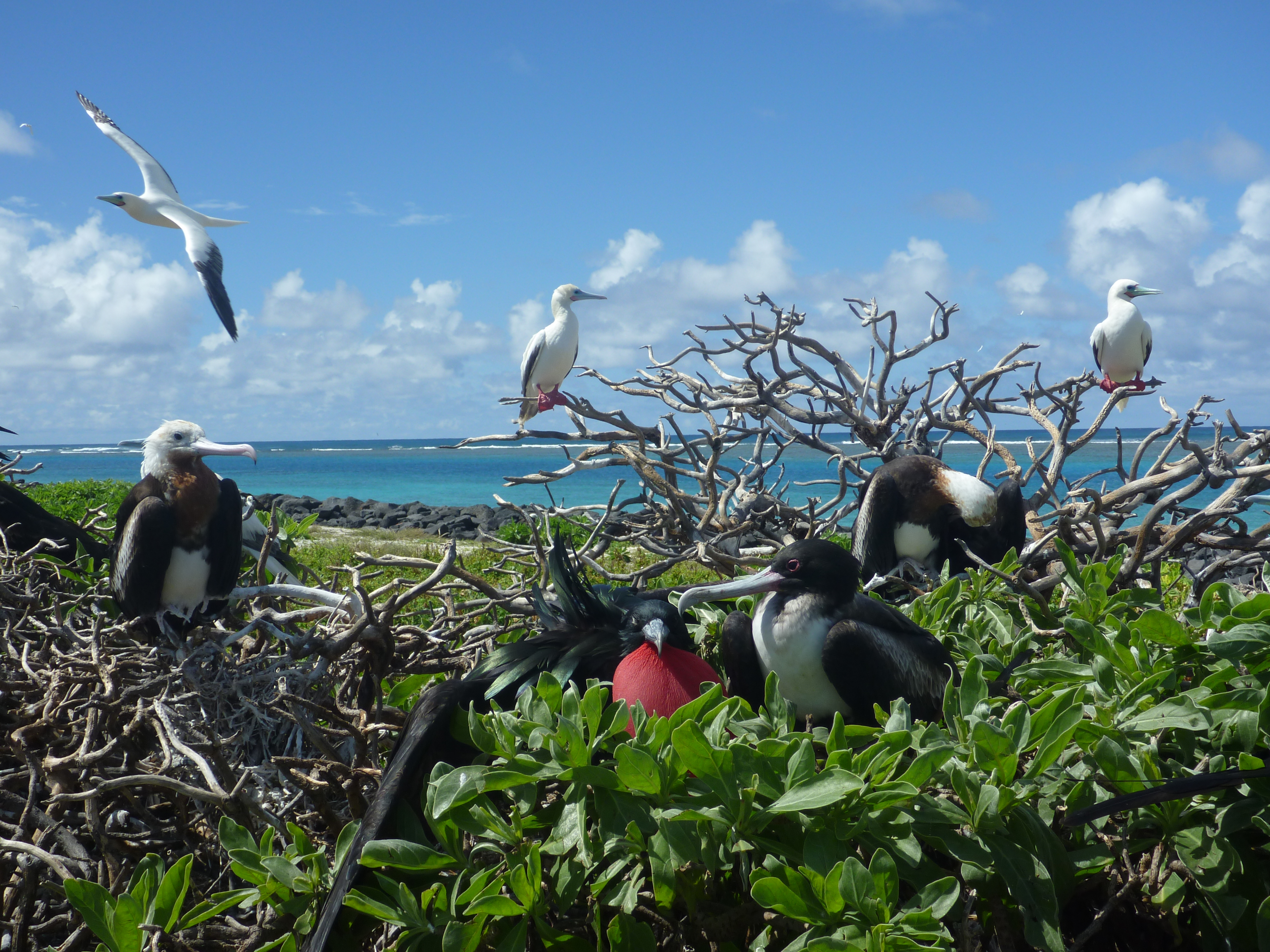
Great frigatebirds and red-footed boobies at Tern Island

More than 150 species of algae live among the reefs. Especially diverse algal communities are found immediately adjacent to La Pèrouse Pinnacle. This has led to speculation that an influx of additional nutrients – in the form of guano – is responsible for the diversity and productivity of algae in this environment. The reef waters support large numbers of fish. The masked angelfish (Genicanthus personatus), endemic to the Hawaiian Islands, is relatively common there. Most of Hawaii's green sea turtles travel to the shoals to nest. The small islets of French Frigate Shoals provide refuge to the largest surviving population of Hawaiian monk seals, the second most endangered pinniped in the world.

The islands are also an important seabird colony. Eighteen species of seabird, the black-footed albatross, Laysan albatross, Bonin petrel, Bulwer's petrel, wedge-tailed shearwater, Christmas shearwater, Tristram's storm petrel, red-tailed tropicbird, masked booby, red-footed booby, brown booby, great frigatebird, spectacled tern, sooty tern, blue-gray noddy, brown noddy, black noddy and white tern nest on the islands, most of them (16) on Tern Island. Two species, the blue-gray noddy and the brown booby, nest only on La Pèrouse Pinnacle. The island also is the wintering ground for several species of shorebird.

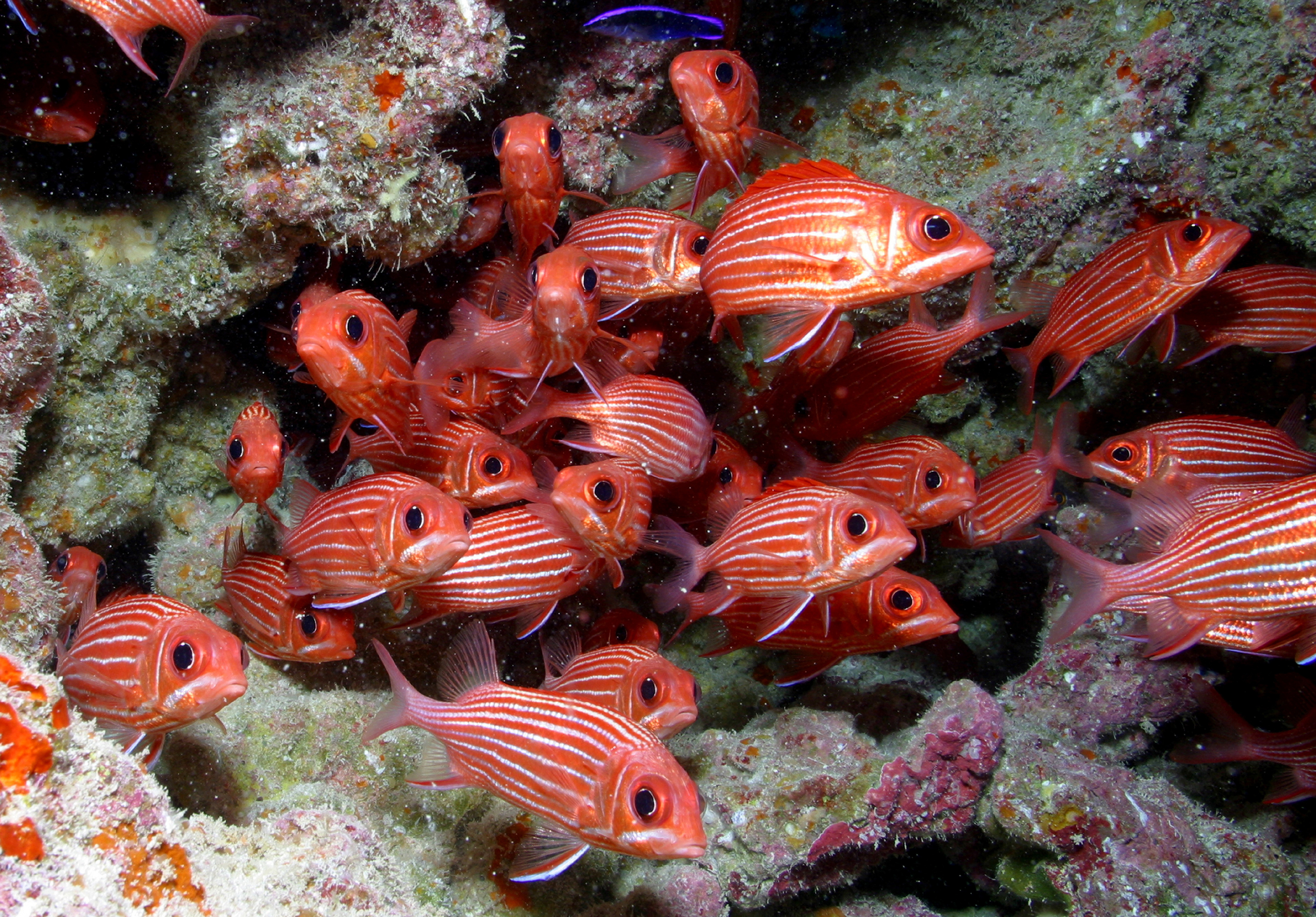
Hawaiian squirrelfish in French Frigate Shoal corals

After the Battle of Midway in WWII, Tern Island was made into an airstrip, nicknamed the "coral carrier" and would be between Midway Island and the main Hawaiian island. Tern Island was protected by thousands of feet of double wall steel sea wall, which has kept it stable in size. However, by 2000 the seawall was trapping marine life and Congress authorized some repair work. The seawall is noted for trapping seals because there are holes where life gets into the gap between the two walls but cannot escape. In 2023, the entrapment of seals in the decayed seawall was noted during a visit to the island.

A three-week research mission in October 2006 by the NOAA led to the discovery of 100 species never seen in the area before, including many that were new to science. The French Frigate Shoals project was part of the Census of Coral Reef Ecosystems of the Census of Marine Life. In addition to scientific analysis, a National Geographic photographer was also on board. The photographer noted the range of vibrant colors and shapes among the coral life. Jim Maragos, an expert on coral life in this region of ocean estimated they discovered 11 new species of coral.

The shark population and type was studied in 2009, and it was determined that some of the species in the area include galapagos sharks, gray reef sharks, and tiger sharks.

The activity of Tiger and Galapagos sharks at the shoals was studied, in particular their interaction with monk seal pups, though the study was hampered by a shark cull intended to protect seal pups leading to an inconclusive result. Due to a miscommunication, the study was undertaken in part to study if a shark cull would be worthwhile to protect endangered monk seals, but in fact a cull took place at the same time a study was being conducted, leading to various difficulties including that sharks that had been tracked with a transmitter could be killed. Tiger sharks are also thought to eat young albatross, and the study also explored the seasonal timing of shark activity.

Whale-Skate and Trig Islands were noted as monk seal pupping areas, though they have suffered strong erosion.

=== Coral ===
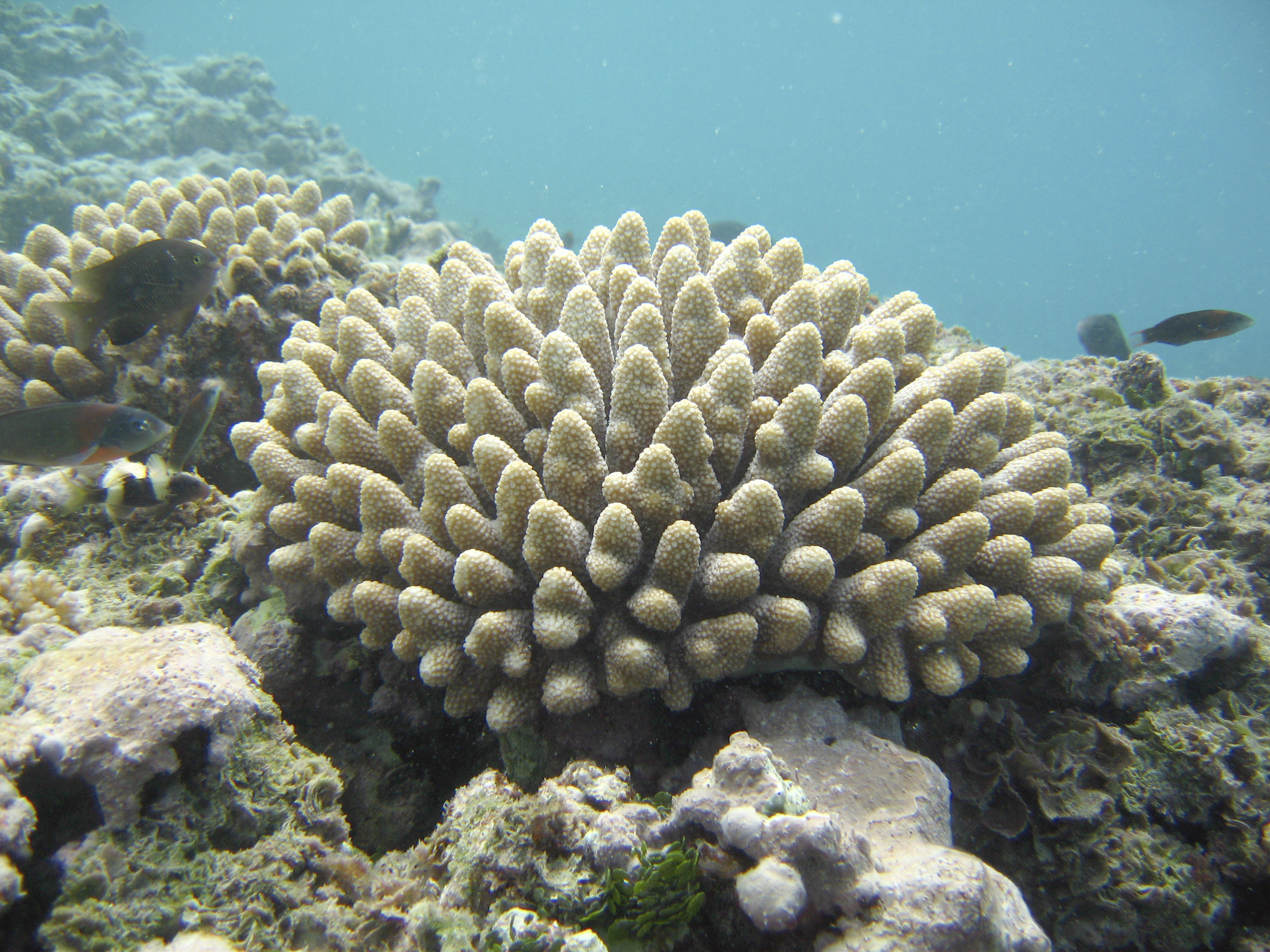
Coral of genus Acropora (Acroporidae) in the waters of the French Frigate Shoals, 2006

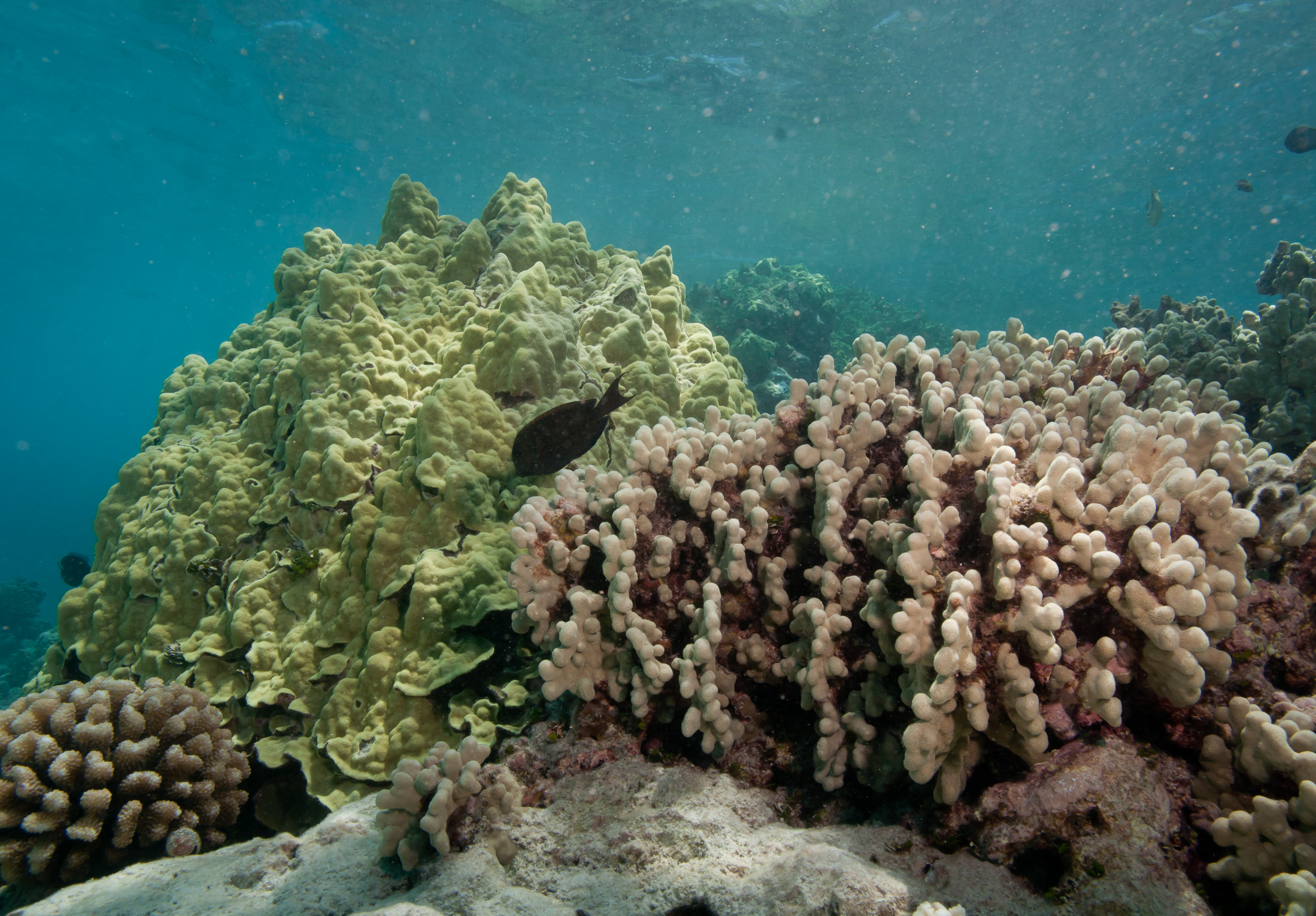
Coral near Shark Island, 2011. From left to right: cauliflower coral (Pocillopora meandrina), lobe coral (Porites lobata), and finger coral (Porites compressa).

Coral species found in the French Frigate Shoals between 1907 and 2006, as reported in a 2011 paper by Brainard et al.:

- Coral unidentified, sp.18
- L. incrustans
- P. eydouxi
- Acropora cerealis
- L. sp.22 cf. incrustans
- P. sp.10 cf. laysanesis
- Acropora gemmifera
- L. mycetoseroides
- P. ligulata
- A. humilis
- L. cf. papyracea sp19
- Pocillopora meandrina
- A. nasuta
- L. cf. scabra sp17
- P. molokensis
- A. paniculata
- Pavona duerdeni
- P. sp.32 cf. verrucosa
- A. sp.1 (prostrate)
- P. maldivensis
- P. sp.33 cf. zelli
- A. sp.28 cf. retusa
- P. varians
- P. sp.11 cf. capitata
- A. valida
- Balanophyllia sp. (pink)
- P. sp. 15 (paliform lobes)
- A. sp.29 (table)
- Cladopsammia eguchii
- Porites brighami
- A. sp.30 cf. palmerae
- Tabastraea coccinea
- Porites compressa
- A. sp. 20 (neoplasia/tumor?)
- Cyphastrea ocellina
- P. sp.23 (arthritic fingers)
- A. sp.26 cf. loripes
- Leptastrea agassizi
- P. duerdeni
- Montipora capitata
- 'L. bewickensis
- P. evermanni
- M. flabellate
- L. purpurea
- P. hawaiiensis
- M. patula
- L. pruinosa
- Porites lobata
- M. sp.4 cf. incrassate
- L. sp.8 cf. ?
- F. hawaiiensis
- P. sp.21 cf. lobata
- M. sp.7 (foliaceous)
- Cycloseris tenuis
- P. sp. 16 cf. lutea
- M. tuberculosa
- C. vaughani
- P. sp.27 (columns)
- M. sp.24 (irregular)
- Diaseris distorta
- P. sp.13 cf. solida
- M. verrilli
- Fungia scutaria
- Psammocora nierstraszi
- Leptoseris hawaiiensis
- Pocillopora damicornis
- P. stellate

== Islands ==
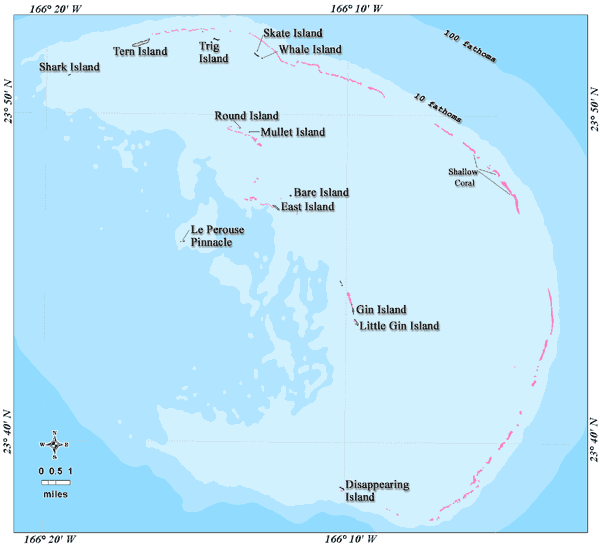
Map of the French Frigate Shoals

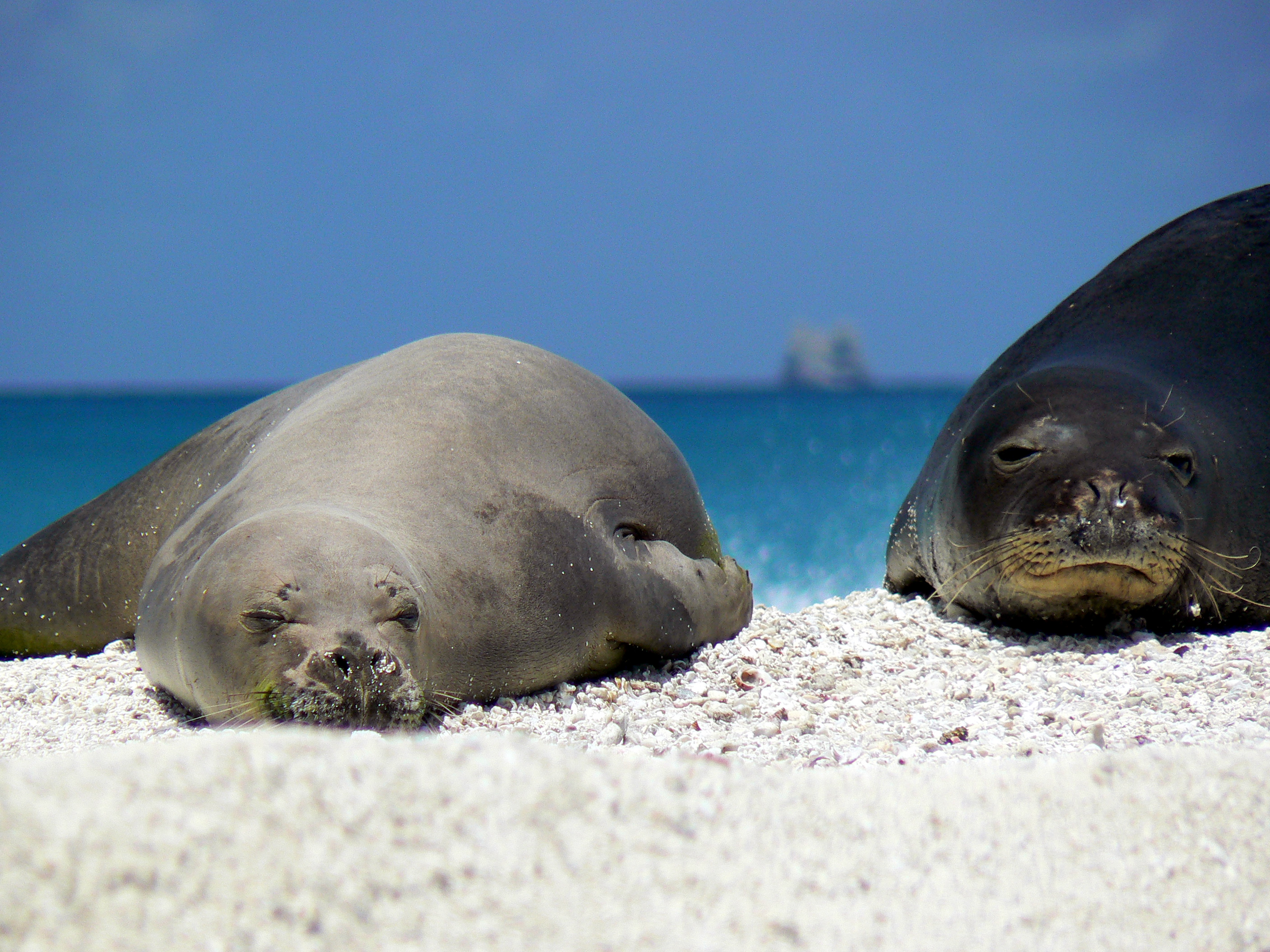
Monk seals rest on a sand bar, the pinnacle in background

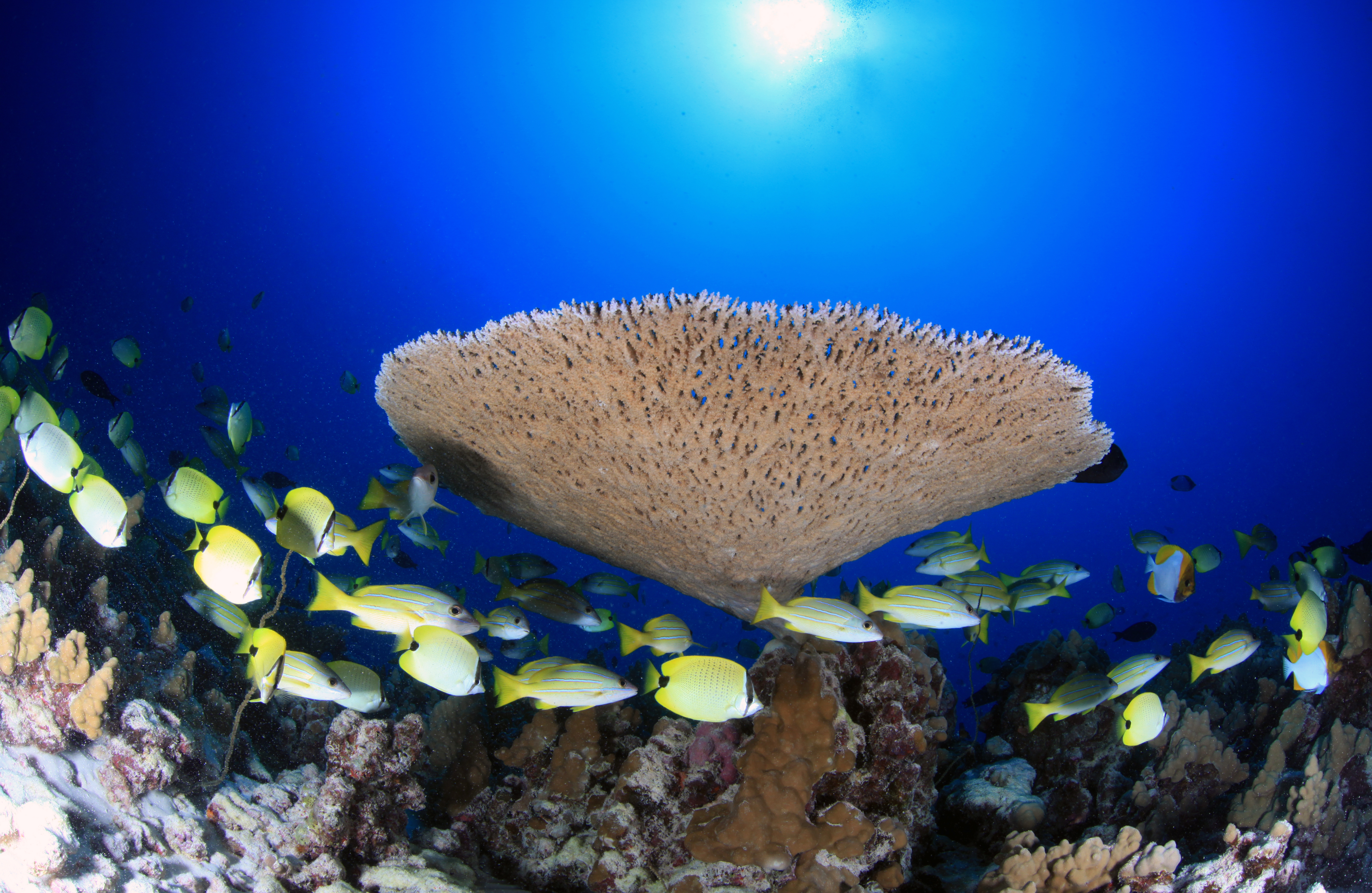
Acropora cytherea coral and sealife in the French Frigate Shoals reef: the reef grows slowly from growing corals

The three biggest islands were Tern, East, and Trig Islands. However, by the 2020s both East and Trig Island had mostly washed away. Tern and East had been home to naval and/or Coast Guard bases in the late 20th century. Since 2012, Tern Island has not been occupied but is still routinely visited for trash cleanup and research. Tern is protected by a large steel seawall built during World War II. One island that also has remained constant is La Perouse Pinnacle, which is dense volcanic rock and is also the tallest point in the group. The islands have gone through several administrative changes in the 20th century shifting from hunting area for sea turtles, to military uses, then later on more of science and nature reserve. The largest remaining island is Tern, and the pinnacle is also fixed. Other islands can be washed away by storms.

Island	Census- block	Original area m^{2}	Coordinates
Shark Island	1010	4,294	23°51′09.9″N 166°19′26.3″W
Tern Island	1009	105,276	23°52′10.7″N 166°17′04.6″W
Trig Island	1008	23,298	23°52′17.8″N 166°14′35.9″W
Skate Island^{1)}	1007	12,808	23°52′02.8″N 166°13′53.9″W
Whale Island^{1)}	1007	19,212	23°52′02.0″N 166°13′51.1″W
Disappearing Island	1002	9,800	23°38′39.5″N 166°10′15.8″W
Little Gin Island	1003	19,448	23°43′43.6″N 166°09′50.5″W
Gin Island	1004	9,708	23°44′04.3″N 166°09′56.1″W
Near Island^{2)}	-	400	23°48′20″N 166°13′46″W
Bare Island^{3)}	-	400	23°47′33.25″N 166°12′05.75″W
East Island^{4)}	1005	35,853	23°47′12.5″N 166°12′32.8″W
Mullet Island^{5)}	1006	2,462	23°49′29.3″N 166°13′29.5″W
Round Island^{5)}	1006	3,078	23°49′36.0″N 166°13′46.1″W
La Perouse Pinnacle	1011	3,677	23°46′10″N 166°15′39″W

^{1)} Whale-Skate Island, currently a double island, is also listed in the census documents together as a block, with an area of 32,020 m^{2} (7.91 acres). The shares of the islands are estimated 40% and 60%.
^{2)} 1971 it was reported that Near Island, although recorded on maps, would be submerged at high tide.
^{3)} Bare Island can be seen on satellite images but is not listed in the Census Tract. A 1971 publication says Bare Island has an area of 0.1 acres (400 m^{2}).
^{4)} As of October 2018, East Island has mostly submerged.
^{5)} Round and Mullet Islands in census documents found together as a block 1006, together with an area of 5,540 m^{2} (1.37 acres). The shares are valued according to a report from 1971 (0.4 and 0.5 acres, 1,600 and 2,000 m^{2}).

The two major islands of the French Frigate shoals were Tern Island and East Island, and there is also a tall rock pinnacle. Many of the smaller islands have been washed over, and finally in 2018 East Island was largely washed away. Tern Island is protected by a seawall that originates from when it was expanded in the 1940s to become a naval air base.

Islands known to have been notably washed away or reduced by 2018 include Whale-Skate, Trig, and East Island. In the 2020s East Island is reported to be about half its former size.

=== Trig Island ===
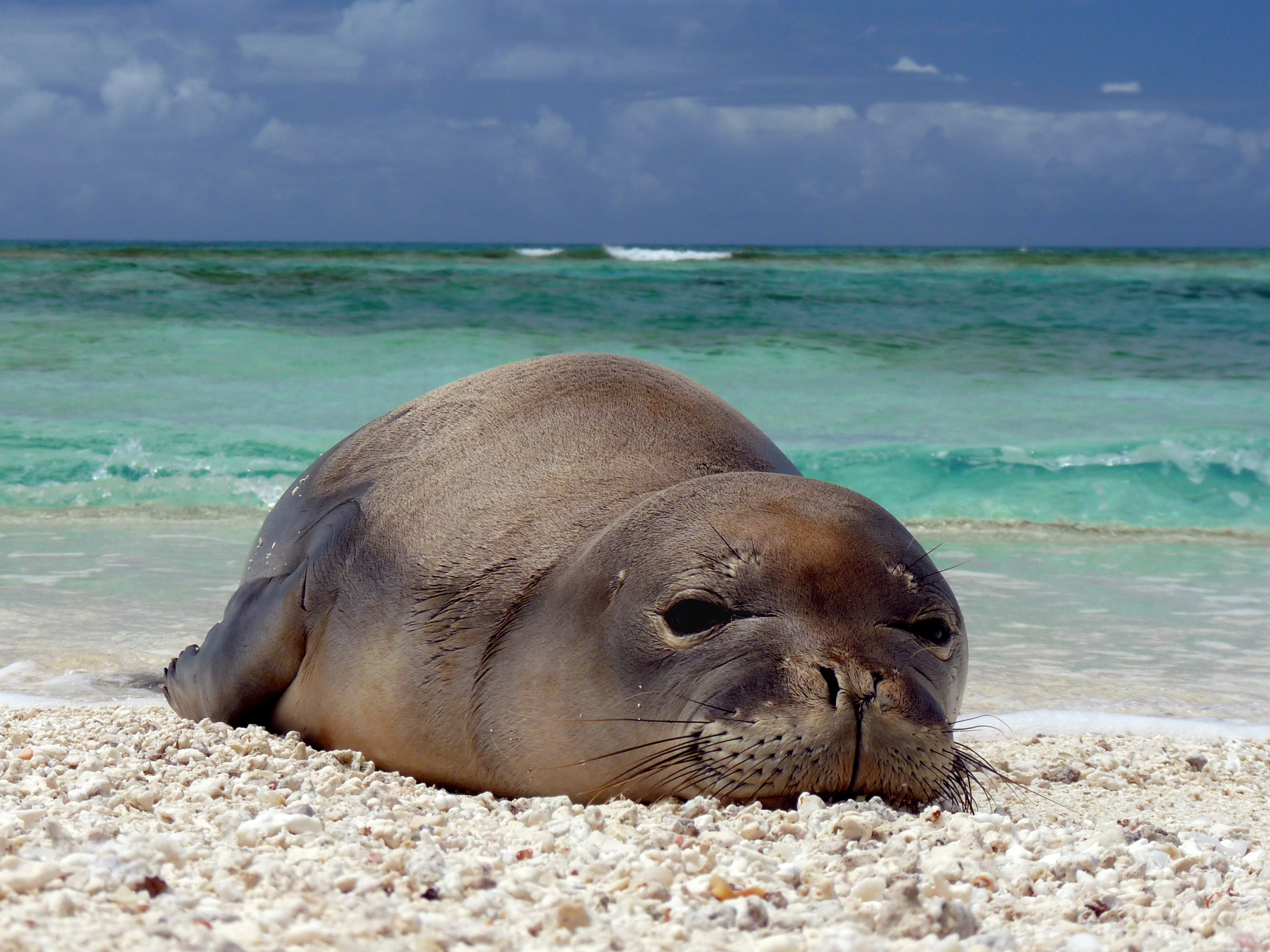
A monk seal at Trig Island

Trig Island is located at 23'52'N, 166'15', and is about 10 acres of area of which approximately 6 acres (24,000 m^{2}) have vegetation. The island is about 1,200 feet (370 m) long and between 200 and 300 feet (61 and 91 m) wide. However, the island is known to have weathered considerably between the 1930s and 1960s. It was surveyed several times in the 1920s and 1930s. In the early surveys it was noted as the highest of French Frigate Shoals' islands rising to 20 feet (6.1 m) above sea level. By 2018 it was mostly washed away.

=== Whale-Skate Island ===
Whale-Skate Island used to be two separate islands but were combined by a sand bar in the 20th century. Whale-Skate Island was about 2,100 feet (640 m) long and 16.8 acres (68,000 m^{2}).

In 1923 they were surveyed as two separate islands, Whale Island and Skate Island. In the 1950s it was noted they had been connected by a sand bar several feet high.

In the 1980s, Whale-Skate Island was about 6.8 hectares (17 acres), and was noted as a pupping area for seals.

=== La Perouse Pinnacle ===
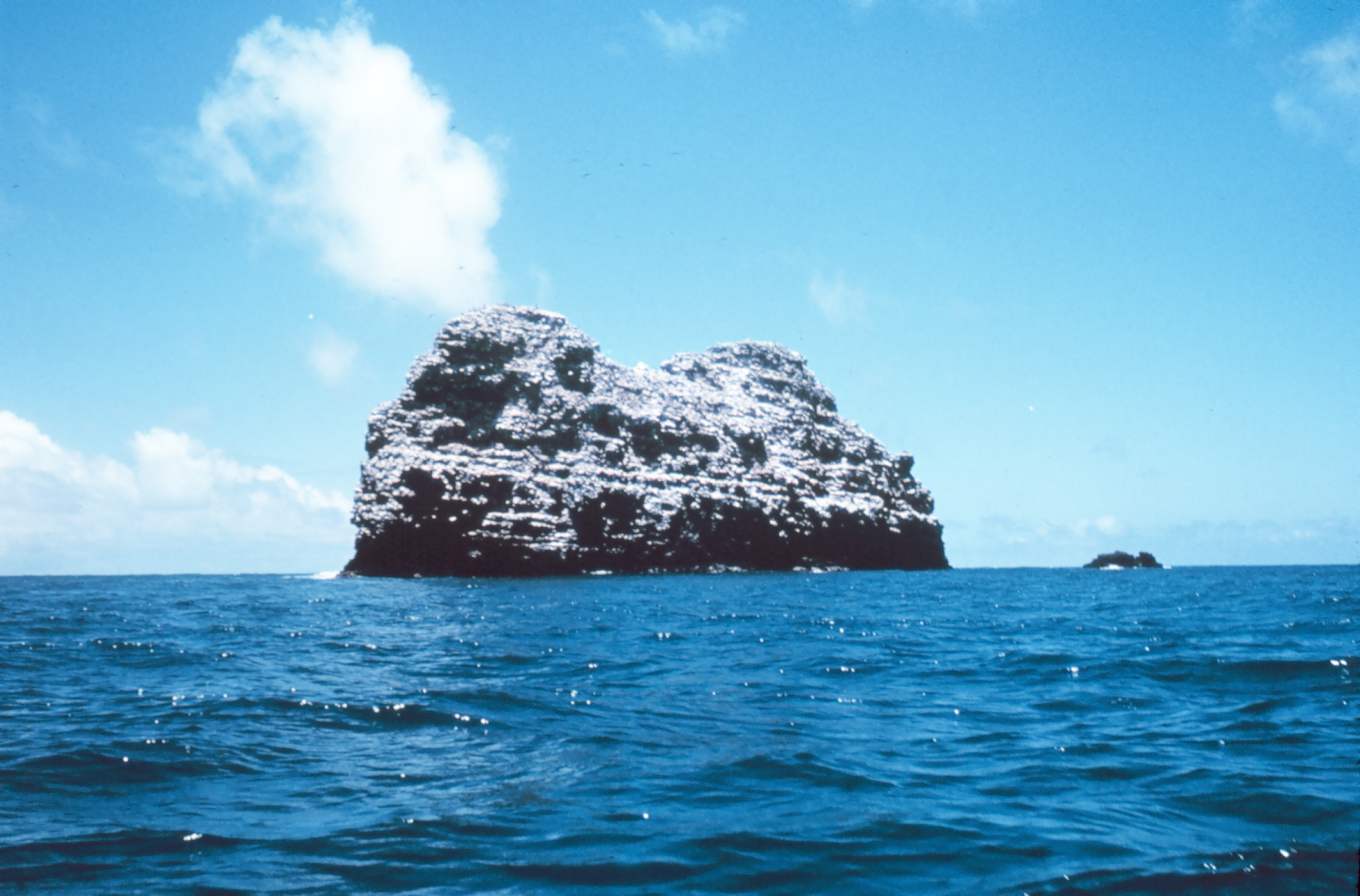
La Perouse Pinnacle, 1966

La Perouse Pinnacle is a volcanic pinnacle approximately three miles (4.8 km) west southwest of East Island (Hawaii). It is the oldest and most remote volcanic rock in the Hawaiian Islands. La Pèrouse Pinnacle stands 122 ft (37 m) tall. It is surrounded by coral reefs and a shorter, rocky islet about 5–10 feet (1.5–3.0 m) tall. Because of its distinct shape, the pinnacle can be mistaken for a ship from a distance.

It has been called a "volcanic rock islet" and is known for its central position in the French Frigate Shoals between north and south sides of the atoll. The pinnacle is visible from a distance of about 8 miles (12.8 km) away at sea.

The rock is named for Jean-François de Galaup, comte de Lapérouse, who came across the shoals in 1786.

The pinnacle is composed mainly of very hard basalt rock, and the island is thought to be the remains of a volcano from millions of years ago.

In 1923 on the Tanager expedition it was visited and determined to be olivine basalt rock.

The pinnacle's resemblance to a sailing ship at distance nearly caused the wrecking of the sailing ship Rebecca in the 19th century. The whaling ship Rebecca sighted the pinnacle at nightfall, but mistook it for a sailing ship and tried to signal with it. When the signals were not returned the Rebecca headed towards the ship to investigate, but soon ran into the reef. The ship survived the encounter with the shoals, and was able to ascertain the nature of the Pinnacle in the morning.

== Locations ==
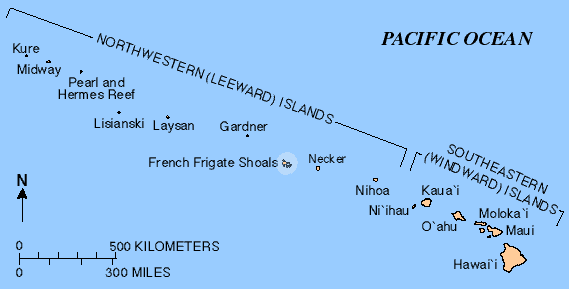
Location of the French Frigate Shoals in the chain of islands

== See also ==
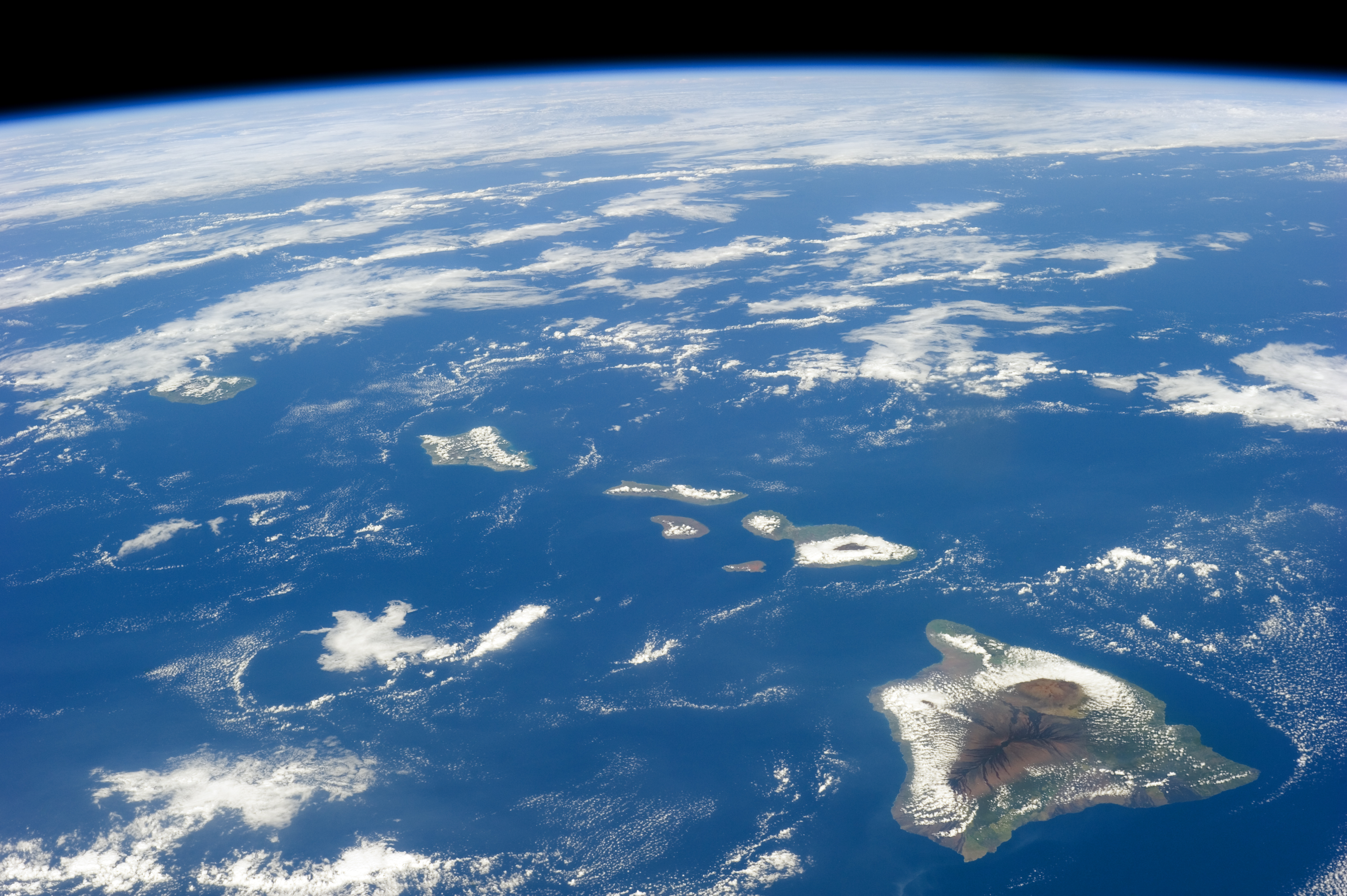
Hawaiian island chain from space, looking East starting with Big island (Hawaii)

- List of Guano Island claims
- List of reefs
- List of islands
- Desert island
- Midway Island (the next Island to the west with a airstrip)
- Wake Island (Southwest with airstrip)

== Bibliography ==
- Grobmeier, Alvin H.; Melman, R. Stan; Rau, William M.; Truebe, Carl E. (1989). "Question 43/87". Warship International. XXVI (1): 90–92. ISSN 0043-0374.
