= La Perouse Pinnacle =

Rock outcrop in the Pacific Ocean

Coordinates: 23°46′09″N 166°15′39″W

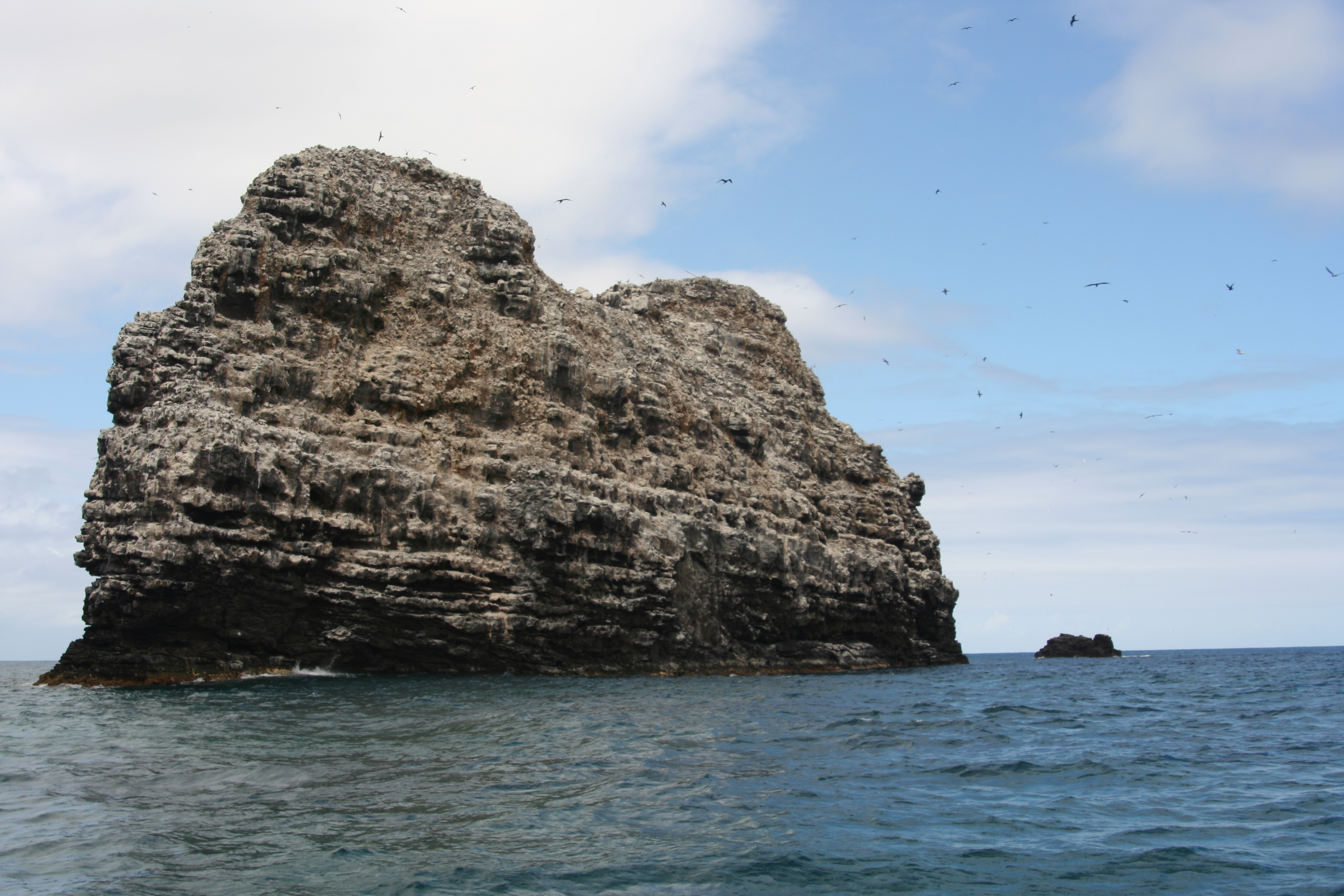
La Perouse Pinnacle in 2006

La Perouse Pinnacle is a steep basalt outcrop at French Frigate Shoals in the Pacific Ocean. Rising approximately 122 ft (37 m) above sea surface, it is the eroded plug of a shield volcano and caldera that formed 12 million years ago. The rocky formation lies within the Papahānaumokuākea Marine National Monument. Because of its prominence and shape, the pinnacle can be mistaken for a sailing ship from a distance.

== Geography ==
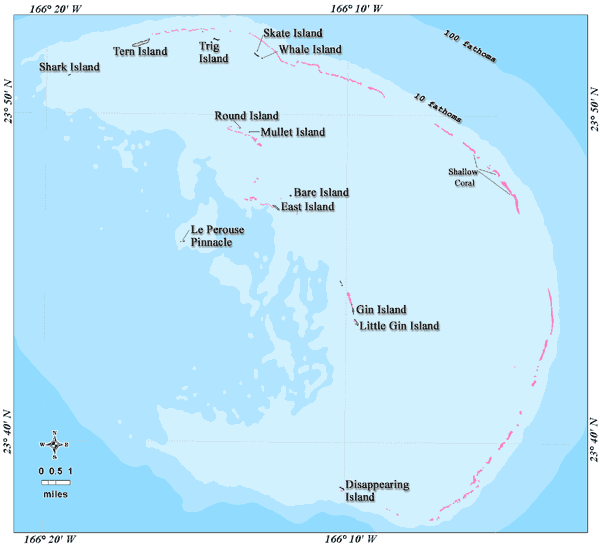
Map of French Frigate Shoals, La Perouse Pinnacle is located center-left

The pinnacle stands at the heart of French Frigate Shoals, 3 mi (5 km) west-southwest of East Island, about midway in the Northwestern Hawaiian Islands. The formation rises 122 ft (37 m) above the ocean. It is composed of dense basalt rock, covering an area of approximately 39,580 sq ft (3,677 m^{2}), that extends 751 ft (229 m) in the northwest–southeast direction, with a maximum width of 160 ft (50 m). The pinnacle is visible from a distance of about 8 mi (13 km) away. It is surrounded by coral reefs and a shorter, rocky islet about 5–10 ft (1.5–3.0 m) tall. This environment provides a habitat for diverse species of seabirds and Marine life.

== Modern history ==
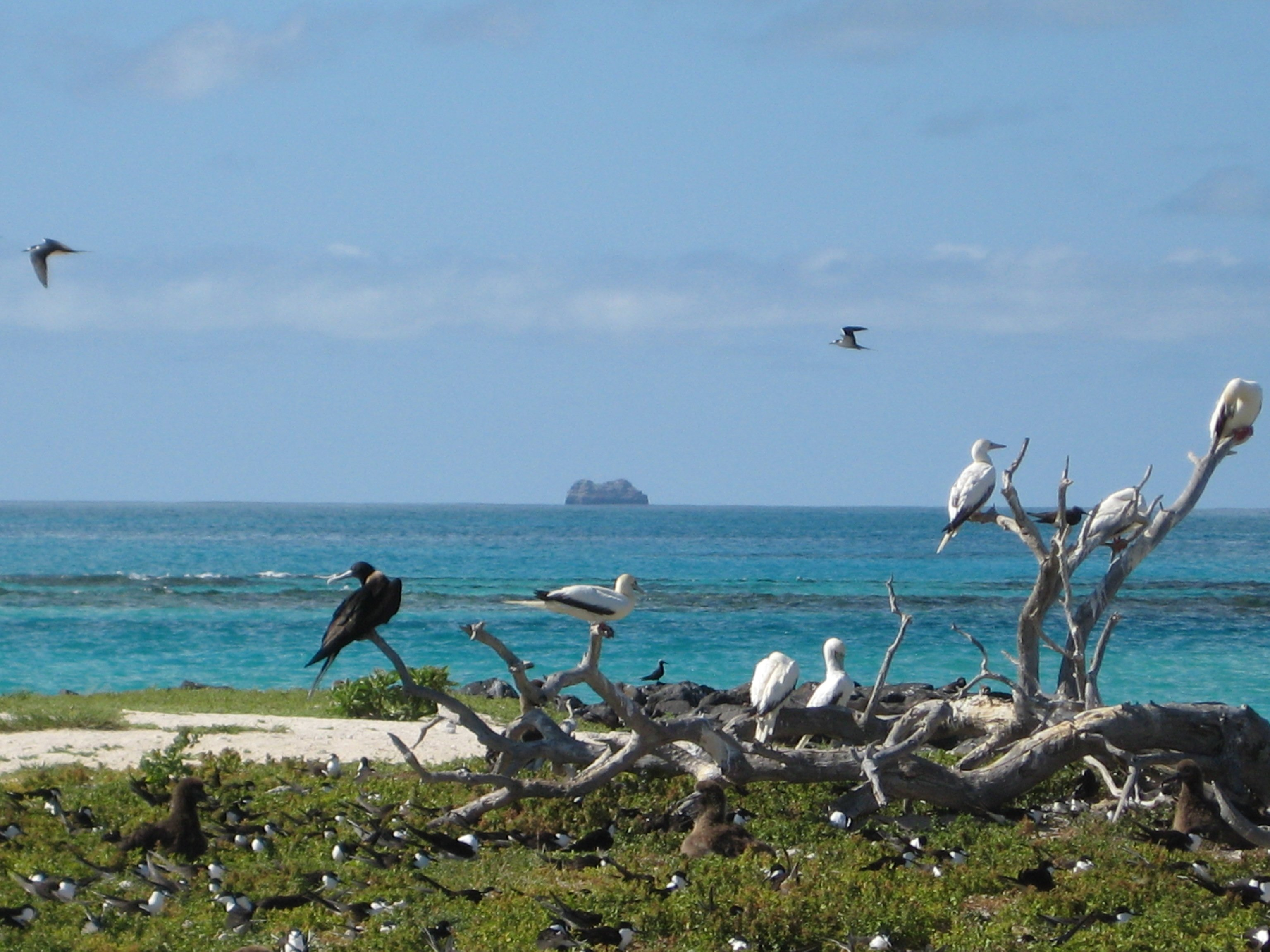
La Perouse Pinnacle as viewed from the southern shore of Tern Island

The formation is named for Jean-François de Galaup, comte de Lapérouse. In the spring of 1786, the French frigates Astrolabe, under Fleuriot de Langle, and Boussole, under de Galaup, narrowly avoided disaster at French Frigate Shoals. The Boussole mistook the pinnacle for the Astrolabe, but a last-minute course correction averted collision.

In the 19th century, the whaling ship Rebecca, on a moonlit night, mistook La Perouse Pinnacle for a sailing vessel. Attempts to signal went unanswered, and the ship ran aground on the reef, however the ship and the crew survived.

In 1923, the Tanager expedition visited and made the first scientific determination of the pinnacle's basalt rock composition.

The pinnacle was a noted landmark by sailor's conducting a search for a lost sailor in the late 2010s, and was noted in an article in the sailing magazine Cruising World in 2018.

== See also ==
- Ball's Pyramid, the tallest basalt outcrop on earth, also located in the Pacific Ocean
