= USS Porpoise (1836) =

Dolphin-class brigantine

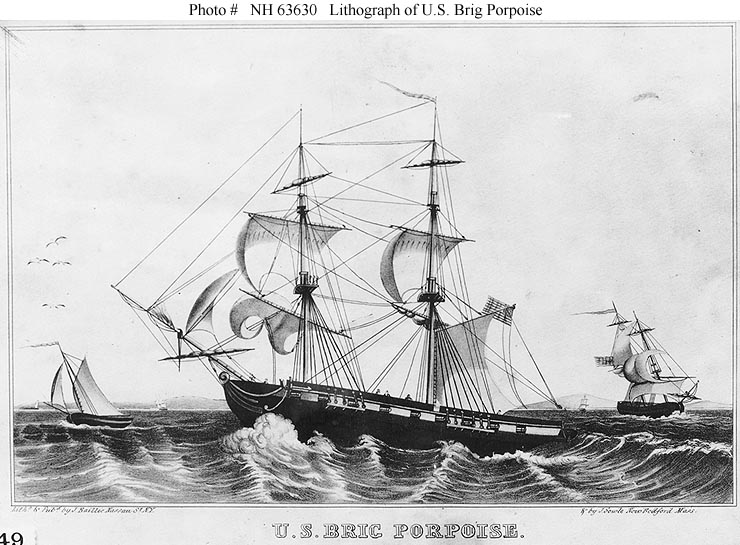
- USS Porpoise

History

United States
- Name: USS Porpoise
- Ordered: 30 June 1834
- Laid down: 1835
- Launched: 31 May 1836
- Commissioned: 1836
- Decommissioned: ca. July 1847
- Recommissioned: 1 January 1848
- Decommissioned: 3 August 1852
- Recommissioned: May 1853
- Fate: Disappeared September 1854

General characteristics
- Type: Brig
- Tonnage: 224
- Length: 88 ft (27 m)
- Beam: 25 ft (7.6 m)
- Draft: 11 ft (3.4 m)
- Propulsion: Sail
- Complement: 80 officers and enlisted
- Armament: 2 × 9 pdr (4.1 kg) guns, 8 × 24 pdr (11 kg) carronades

The second USS Porpoise was a 224-ton Dolphin-class brigantine. (In early American usage, a brigantine was referred to as a hermaphrodite brig.) Porpoise was later re-rigged as a brig. She was based on the same plans as Dolphin.

Porpoise was authorized by Congress on 30 June 1834; built in 1835; and launched 31 May 1836; Lieutenant William Ramsay in command.

== Service history ==
Porpoise sailed from Boston, Massachusetts on 25 August 1836, called at various southern ports, and conducted coastal surveying operations under the direction of Lt. Charles Wilkes in the summer of 1837. In October 1837, she hunted pirates along the southern coast, and then resumed her survey work in December.

Porpoise, Lt. Cadwalader Ringgold in command, was then assigned to the squadron which Wilkes was to command on an extended exploratory expedition around the world. She stood out of Hampton Roads on 18 August 1838 with the United States Exploring Expedition Squadron. She assisted in the exploration and survey work of the Expedition as it confirmed the existence of the Antarctic Continent, charted vast areas of the South Pacific, circumnavigated the world, and returned to New York four years later.

In 1841, Porpoise and USS Oregon visited the French Frigate Shoals for the United States Exploring Expedition. Porpoise additionally visited Vostok Island and made the first recorded attempt to land on the island.

Porpoise underwent overhaul at New York at the end of 1842 and sailed on 8 February 1843 for the west coast of Africa to join the squadron patrolling for slavers. She returned to New York on 19 November 1844.

From February 1845-July 1847, Porpoise cruised in the Gulf of Mexico, participating in the Naval operations against Tampico, Pánuco, and Veracruz during the War with Mexico. Upon return to Norfolk, Virginia, she remained decommissioned until 1 January 1848.

During the next three and a half years, she hunted slavers along the west coast of Africa, touching at the U.S. in the spring of 1850 and returning to New York from this extended cruise on 19 December 1851. She again decommissioned on 3 August 1852.

Recommissioned in May 1853, she was assigned to North Pacific Exploring and Surveying Expedition under Commander Cadwalader Ringgold, a veteran, like Porpoise, of the Wilkes Expedition. She joined the squadron at Hampton Roads, and with it, stood out to sea on 11 June 1853. Porpoise rounded the Cape of Good Hope, and with the squadron explored and charted many Pacific islands and shoals before arriving in China in March 1854. The squadron put to sea once more to explore in the Bonins, the Ladrones, and the Marianas. Porpoise parted company with the other vessels on 21 September 1854 between Formosa and China, and was never heard from again. It is supposed that she foundered in a heavy typhoon which occurred a few days after her separation from the squadron.

== See also ==
- European and American voyages of scientific exploration
