= USS Fenimore Cooper =

Tender of the United States Navy

History

United States
- Name: USS Fenimore Cooper
- Namesake: James Fenimore Cooper
- Acquired: January 1853
- Commissioned: 21 March 1853
- Decommissioned: 13 August 1859
- Stricken: 13 August 1859
- Fate: Abandoned in a typhoon in Tokyo Bay, Japan

General characteristics
- Type: Schooner
- Displacement: 95 tons
- Propulsion: Schooner sail
- Armament: Three guns

USS Fenimore Cooper was a United States Navy schooner assigned as a ship’s tender to accompany a surveying expedition. After departing from Hampton Roads, Virginia, and navigating the Cape of Good Hope, the expedition traveled throughout the Pacific Ocean accumulating hydrographic information from the South China Sea to the Bering Strait in the Arctic and Alaska.

Subsequently, Fenimore Cooper performed supply operations based out of San Francisco, California, before once again returning to her Pacific Ocean survey work, which continued until she was destroyed in a typhoon off Yokohama, Japan. The crew survived this and was returned to the United States.

== Service history ==
Fenimore Cooper was a U.S. Navy schooner named for James Fenimore Cooper, an American writer. The ship was formerly the New York pilot boat Skiddy until purchased by the Navy in January 1853. She was commissioned 21 March 1853, Master H. K. Stevens in command. Fenimore Cooper was acquired for use as a ship's tender for the Surveying Expedition to the Bering Strait, North Pacific, and China Seas commanded by Commander C. Ringgold, and later, Lieutenant J. Rodgers.

The expedition of five ships, led by USS Vincennes, sailed from Hampton Roads, Virginia 11 June 1853 for the Cape of Good Hope and the Orient. Fenimore Cooper and two other ships charted archipelagos and passages between Batavia and Singapore and from Java northward to the South China Sea until June 1854, when she rejoined the flagship at Hong Kong. Through that summer, the expedition cruised the coast of China, joining the East India Squadron in protecting American interests. Returning to its surveys in September 1854, the squadron sailed northward to Petropavlovsk, where the ships separated. Vincennes penetrated the Arctic, while Fenimore Cooper searched the Aleutians unsuccessfully for information concerning the fate of the men of the whaler Monongahela, missing since 1853.

Returning to the United States, Fenimore Cooper called at Sitka, Alaska, then Russian territory, in what her commanding officer believed to be the first visit ever paid by an American naval ship to that port. Fenimore Cooper arrived in San Francisco, California 11 October 1855, and through the next three years, carried supplies between Mare Island Navy Yard and San Francisco. Once more assigned to survey duty, she sailed from San Francisco 26 September 1858 to chart the shipping lanes between the U.S. West Coast and China. She made a thorough examination of numerous small islands and reefs in the vicinity of the Hawaiian Islands, and finding a deposit of good quality guano on French Frigate Shoals, took possession of them for the United States 4 January 1859.

The schooner sailed on to take soundings and make observations in the Marianas and the islands south of Japan. In 1859, the position of Necker island and Nihoa island was determined by J. M. Brook on board the schooner. She was used for a Pacific Expedition in 1859 by John M. Brook. On 13 August she arrived in Kanagawa Bay off Yokohama, where on the 23rd she was grounded during a severe typhoon. All her men and most of the stores, instruments, charts and records of survey were saved, but the ship was found not worthy of repair, and abandoned. Her commanding officer and many of her crew returned to the United States on the Japanese ship Candinmarruh.
