= USS Oregon (1841) =

US Navy brig

History

United States
- Name: USS Oregon
- Namesake: The Oregon Territory
- Acquired: August 1841
- Commissioned: 1841
- Fate: Sold 1845
- Notes: Formerly the brig Thomas H. Perkins

General characteristics
- Type: Brig
- Displacement: 250 tons
- Length: 84 ft 9 in (25.83 m) (keel)
- Beam: 22 ft 3 in (6.78 m)
- Draft: 11 ft 2 in (3.40 m)
- Armament: 2 × guns

USS Oregon was a brig that served in the United States Navy from 1841 to 1845.

== Service history ==
Lieutenant Charles Wilkes purchased the American brig Thomas H. Perkins for U.S. Navy service in August 1841 at Astoria, Oregon. Wilkes, commanding the U.S. Exploring Expedition, purchased her to accommodate the officers and crew of USS Peacock, which had been wrecked on 18 July 1841. Renamed Oregon, the acquisition was taken to Fort Vancouver for alterations and fitting out for service with the expedition.

Oregon sailed on 1 October 1841 for San Francisco in the company of the USS Vincennes, the USS Porpoise and the tender USS Flying Fish. Oregon arrived in Honolulu, Hawaii, on 17 November 1841. On 27 November 1841, Oregon and Porpoise were detached to explore the shoals and reefs extending west-northwest of the Hawaiian Islands, intending to rejoin the rest of the ships in Singapore. In need of general repairs, the two arrived there on 19 January 1842, almost a month before the others. On the 26 January 1842, Oregon and Porpoise left with the squadron for Cape Town, South Africa, and St. Helena, then departed on their own again for Rio de Janeiro, Brazil before arriving off Sandy Hook, New Jersey, on 30 June 1842.

USS Oregon along with the USS Porpoise visited the French Frigate Shoals in 1841 for the United States Exploring Expedition.

Oregon was overhauled and repaired at New York City, and fitted for surveying service in the Gulf of Mexico. She sailed 6 December 1842 via Charleston, South Carolina, and Tampa, Florida, and conducted surveys in the Gulf of Mexico until midsummer 1843, returning to Norfolk, Virginia, on 24 July 1843. Used as a school ship there through October 1843, she then carried condemned ordnance from Pensacola, Florida, to New York until August 1844.

On 21 September 1844, Oregon sailed from Norfolk to the Republic of New Granada with dispatches, returning 11 January 1845. Laid up in the Norfolk Navy Yard on 10 April 1845, she was sold soon thereafter.
