= Two Brothers (ship) =

American whaleship sunk off Hawaii in 1823

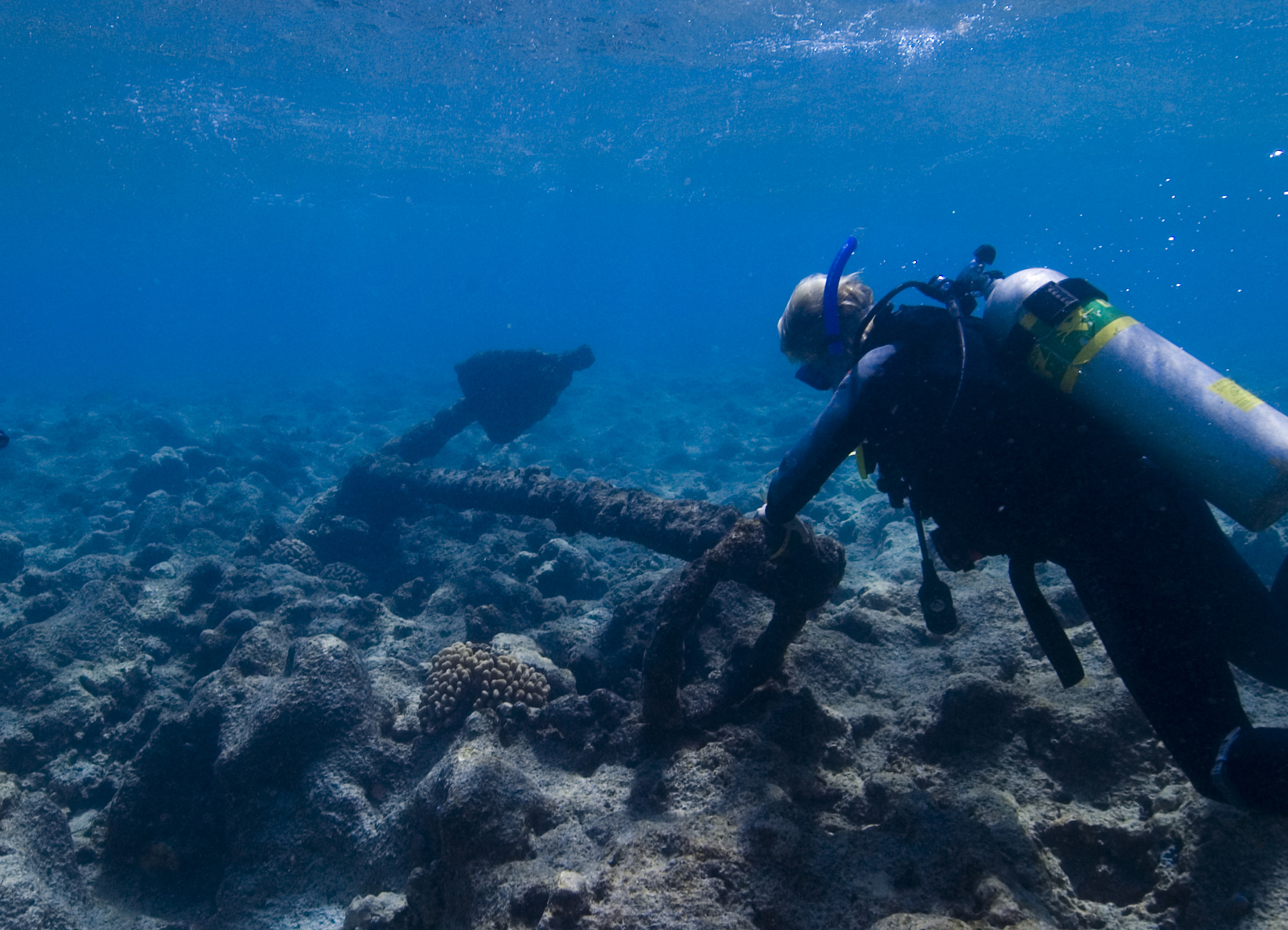
- A diver examines an anchor at the Two Brothers shipwreck site on August 24, 2008.

History

United States
- Name: Two Brothers
- Out of service: February 11, 1823
- Fate: Sank near French Frigate Shoals, February 11, 1823

General characteristics
- Class & type: Nantucket whaler
- Tons burthen: 217 (bm)

Two Brothers was a Nantucket whaleship that sank on the night of February 11, 1823, off the French Frigate Shoals. The ship's captain was George Pollard, Jr., former captain of the famous whaleship Essex. The wreck was discovered in 2008 (announced on February 11, 2011) by a team of marine archaeologists working on an expedition for the National Oceanic and Atmospheric Administration in the Papahānaumokuākea Marine National Monument. She is thought to have been built in 1804 by Joseph Glidden in Hallowell, Maine.

== Whaling voyages ==
On her first whaling voyage, Two Brothers left Nantucket on 21 November 1818, with George B. Worth, master. On March 5, 1821, the ship encountered fellow Nantucket whaleship Dauphin which on February 23 had rescued Captain George Pollard Jr. and crewman Charles Ramsdell who were on a whaleboat from the whaleship Essex which had sunk after being rammed twice by a sperm whale. Pollard, captain of the Essex, and Ramsdell were in poor mental health (dissociative) after 93 days at sea in the whaleboat. They were transferred to Two Brothers which was heading to Valparaíso, Chile.

Two Brothers returned on 5 August 1821 from the Pacific with 1231 barrels of sperm oil and 158 barrels of whale oil.

On her second whaling voyage, Two Brothers left Nantucket on 13 November 1821, with Captain George Pollard Jr., master, and with destination the Pacific.

== Wreck ==
On the night of February 11, 1823—while sailing west through the Northwestern Hawaiian Islands with another whaling ship, Martha—Two Brothers found herself in a storm. The two ships became separated, and Captain Pollard of Two Brothers was unsure of his ship's position. Soon, Two Brothers grounded and sank on a reef near French Frigate Shoals. Captain Pollard did not want to abandon ship, but his crew pleaded with him, and they clung to small boats through the night. The next morning, they were rescued by Martha.

Thomas Nickerson, who served as boatsteerer on Two Brothers, wrote about the wreck. Nickerson had also served with Pollard on the Essex and survived its sinking. Nickerson's account is preserved in a manuscript titled "Loss of the Ship Two Brothers of Nantucket" (MS 106 F3.5) in the collections of the Nantucket Historical Association.

== Two Brothers reef Mystery ==
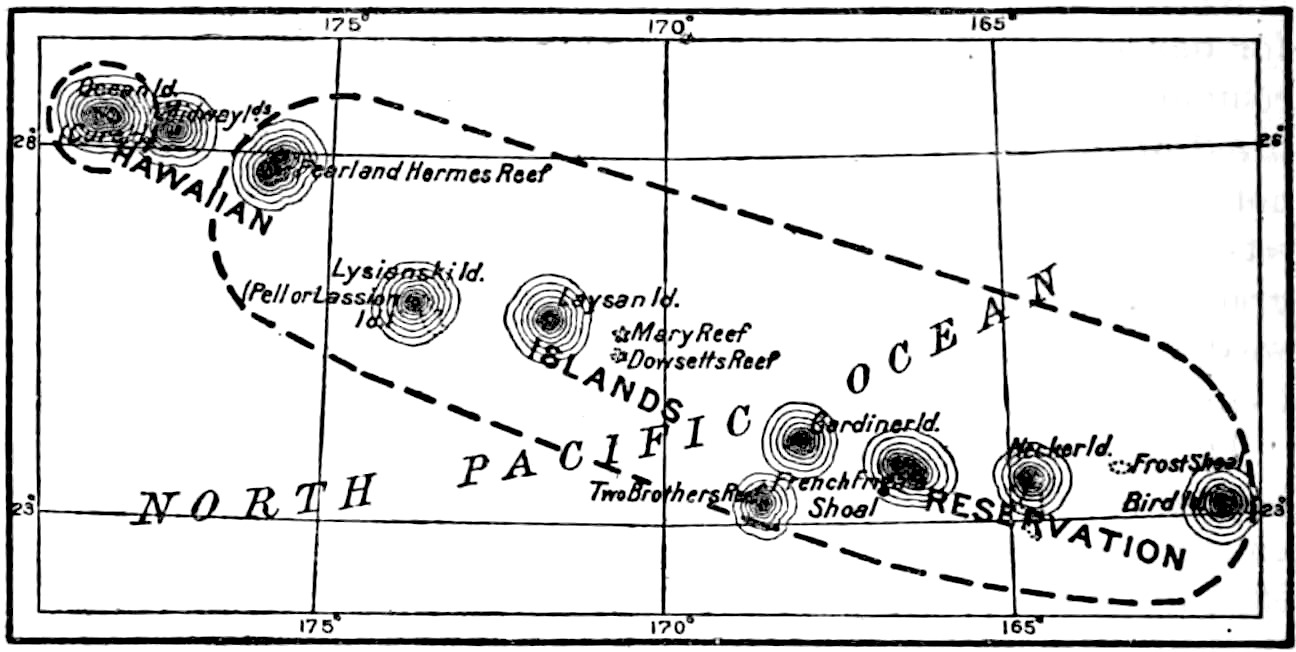
1909 map of the Hawaiian Islands Reservation, showing the alleged Two Brothers reef.

The wrecking of the ship led to the idea that there was a newly discovered reef, which for decades was known as Two Brothers Reef near the French Frigate Shoals. There was some discussion about this, and both Nickerson and Derrick thought this was a misidentification of the French Frigate Shoals, not a new reef. The mentioning of the Two Brothers reef was stopped in 1931 when that area was surveyed and no reef was found, and the identification of the Two Brothers wreck on the French Frigate Shoals further confirms the earlier suspicion that the French Frigate Shoals had been misidentified as a new reef due to a navigational mistake.

“We have not seen a vestige of our ill-fated ship nor haven’t heard what a vestige of her has ever been seen since. I believe this reef has been claimed as a new discovery, but although our reckoning places its position one degree of Latitude to the northward and three degrees to the westward, still I believe with Captain Derrick that it is no other than the French Frigate Shoals and that our navigations were mistaken the more so as I remember that owing to thick weather we had been several days without observation.”

— Thomas Nickerson as quoted by A Sounding Lead on a Distant Reef, Captain Pollard’s Lessons Learned

== Discovery ==
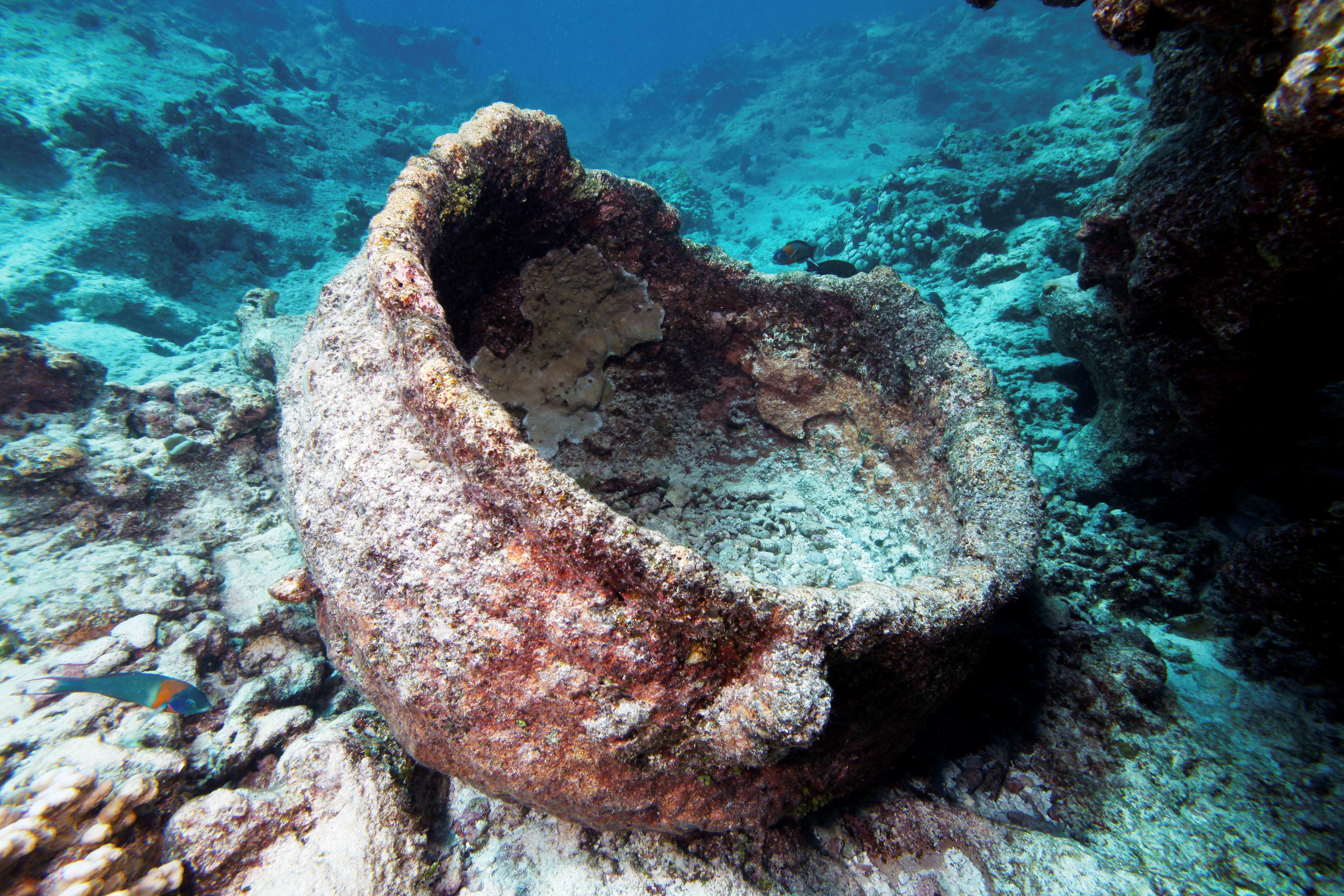
Try pot at the reef

The wreck of Two Brothers was discovered in 2008 by a team of marine archaeologists working on an expedition for the National Oceanic and Atmospheric Administration (NOAA). The identity of the ship was not immediately known, so it was called the "Shark Island Whaler"; the ship's identification as Two Brothers was announced by NOAA on February 11, 2011, the 188th anniversary of her sinking. The wreck is the first discovery of a wrecked Nantucket whaling ship.

Although identifying it as 19th century whaler was indicated by the anchor and various whaling tools such as trypots, there were three such whalers known to have wrecked at the French Frigate Shoals. This included the Two Brothers, but also the South Seaman and the Daniel Wood. The Two Brothers wrecked in 1823, the South Seaman in 1859, and the Daniel Wood in 1867.

Some of the first artifacts found at the wreck site include two anchors, three try pots, bricks, and the remains of the ship's rigging. Expeditions in 2009 and 2010 turned up more artifacts, including blubber hooks, five harpoon tips, three whaling lances, four cast-iron cooking pots, and ceramics and glass.

The shipwreck site was listed on the National Register of Historic Places in 2017.
