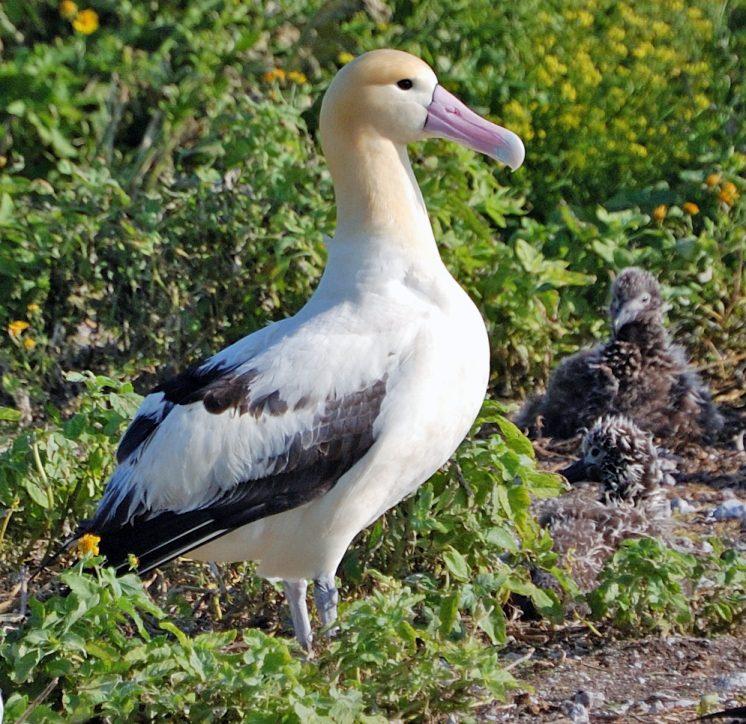

Conservation status
- Vulnerable (IUCN 3.1)
- CITES Appendix II

Scientific classification
- Kingdom: Animalia
- Phylum: Chordata
- Class: Aves
- Order: Procellariiformes
- Family: Diomedeidae
- Genus: Phoebastria
- Species: P. albatrus

Binomial name
- Phoebastria albatrus (Pallas, 1769)

Synonyms
- Diomedea albatrus

= Short-tailed albatross =

Species of marine bird

The short-tailed albatross or Steller's albatross (Phoebastria albatrus) is a large rare seabird from the North Pacific. Although related to the other North Pacific albatrosses, it also exhibits behavioural and morphological links to the albatrosses of the Southern Ocean. It was described by the German naturalist Peter Simon Pallas from skins collected by Georg Wilhelm Steller (after whom its other common name is derived). Once common, it was brought to the edge of extinction by the trade in feathers, but with protection efforts underway since the 1950s, the species is in the process of recovering with an increasing population trend. It is divided into two distinct subpopulations, one of which breeds on Tori-shima in the Izu islands south of Japan, and the other primarily on the Senkaku Islands in the East China Sea.

== Description ==
The short-tailed albatross is a medium-sized albatross, with a wingspan of 213 to 240 cm (6.99–7.87 ft), a length of 84 to 94 cm (33–37 in) and a body weight that can be 4.3 to 8.5 kg (9.5–18.7 lb). Among standard measurements, the bill is 12.7–15.2 cm (5.0–6.0 in) long, the tail is 14–15.2 cm (5.5–6.0 in) long, the tarsus around 10 cm (3.9 in) and the wing chord 51 cm (20 in). Its plumage as an adult is overall white with black flight feathers, some coverts, as well as a black terminal bar on its tail. It has a yellow-stained nape and crown. Its bill is large and pink; however, older birds will gain a blue tip. The juveniles are an all-over brown colour, and they will whiten as they mature, in about 10 to 20 years. It can be distinguished from the other two species of albatross in its range, the Laysan albatross and the black-footed albatross by its larger size and its pink bill (with a bluish tip), as well as details of its plumage. Contrary to its name its tail is no shorter than that of the Laysan or black-footed, and is actually longer than that of the other member of the genus Phoebastria, the waved albatross.

== Range and habitat ==
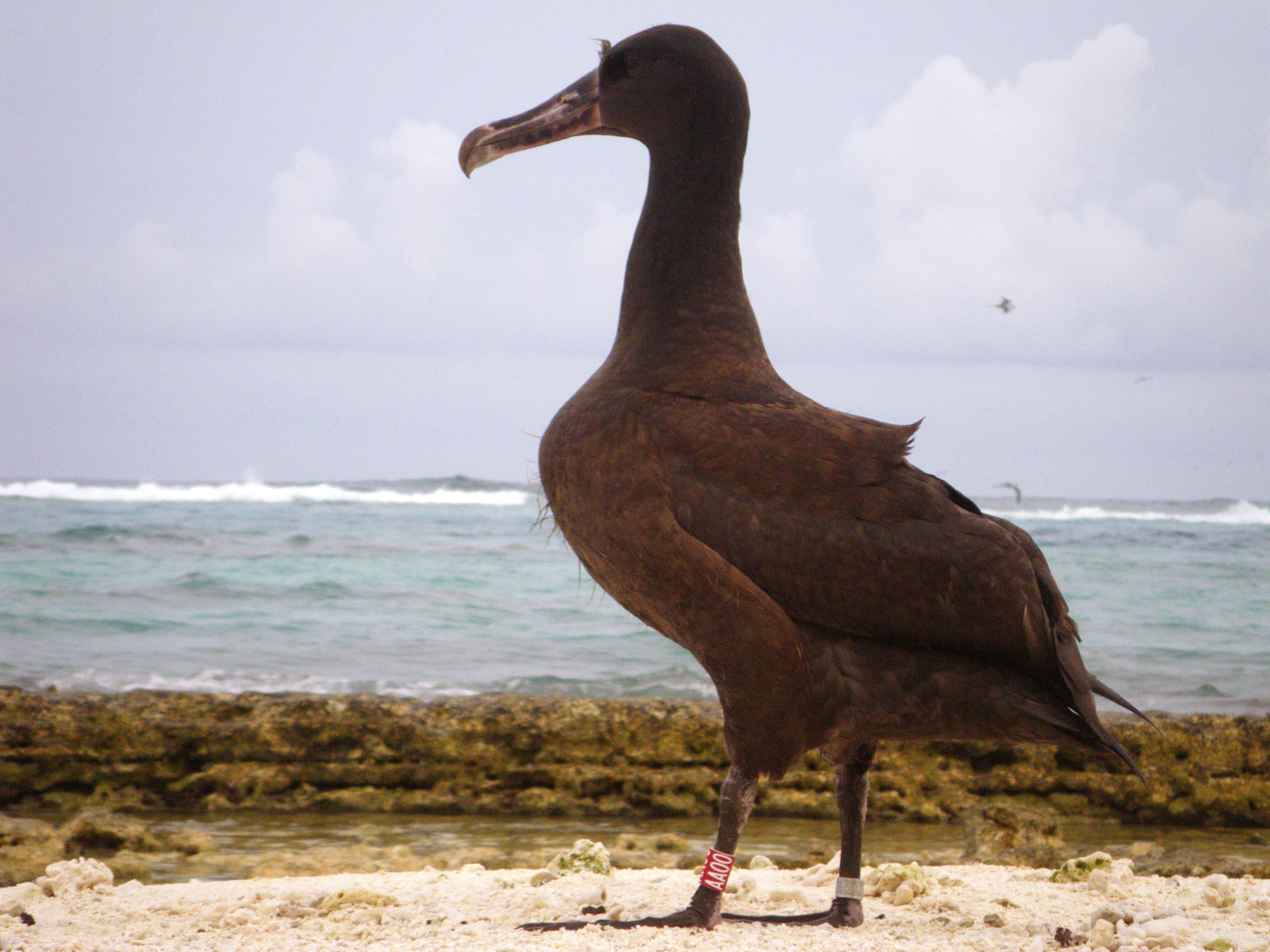
A chick just before it left the Hawaiian archipelago

Short-tailed albatrosses now nest on four islands, with the majority of birds nesting on Tori-shima, and almost all of the rest on Minami-kojima in the Senkaku Islands. A female-female pair began nesting on Kure in the late 2000s. A chick hatched on 14 January 2011 on Midway. Both Midway and Kure are in the Northwestern Hawaiian Islands. In 2012 a pair began incubating an egg on Muko-jima, in the Bonin Islands, Japan. During non-breeding season they range across the North Pacific, with the males and juveniles gathering in the Bering Sea, and the females feeding off the coast of Japan and eastern Russia. They can also be found as far east as California. In fact, the short-tailed albatross is seen on a number of the United States' state endangered species lists including Washington.

The species has been extirpated as a breeder from Kita-no-shima, Enewetak Atoll, Kobishi, and the Bonin Islands (Nishino Shima, Yomejima, and (until recently) Mukojima). It also formerly bred on Bermuda during the Pleistocene.

== Taxonomy ==
Short-tailed albatrosses are a type of albatross that belong to the family Diomedeidae, order Procellariiformes, along with shearwaters, fulmars, storm petrels, and diving petrels. They share certain identifying features. First, they have nasal passages that attach to the upper bill called naricorns. Although the nostrils on the albatross are on the sides of the bill. The bills of Procellariiformes are also unique in that they are split into between seven and nine horny plates. Finally, they produce a stomach oil made up of wax esters and triglycerides that is stored in the proventriculus. This is used against predators as well as an energy rich food source for chicks and for the adults during their long flights. They also have a salt gland which is situated above the nasal passage helping desalinate their bodies, as an adaptation to the high amount of ocean water they imbibe. It excretes a high saline solution from their nose.

The species is divided into two major clades/populations, one of which exclusively breeds on Tori-shima, and the other breeds primarily on the Senkaku Islands with a small number on Tori-shima. These two populations are genetically, morphologically, and behaviourally distinct, preferring to mate with their own kind, and as such it has been argued by some authors that they should be classified as two separate cryptic species.

== Behaviour ==
=== Feeding ===
The short-tailed albatross feeds mainly on squid, but will follow ships for their discarded offal.

=== Reproduction ===
This albatross historically preferred to nest on large open areas near stands of the grass, Miscanthus sinensis.

The short-tailed albatross usually first breeds at 10 years of age.

The short-tailed albatross lays a clutch of one egg that is dirty white, with red spots, mainly at the blunt end of the egg. It usually measures 116 by 74 millimetres (4.6 in × 2.9 in). The egg is incubated for around 65 days. Both sexes incubate the eggs.

== Conservation ==
Breeding population and trends
Breeding location	Population	Trend
Tori-shima (Izu Islands)	3540	up from 25 since 1954
Minami-kojima and Kita-kojima	650	Unknown
Ogasawara Islands	10	Unknown
Total	4200	

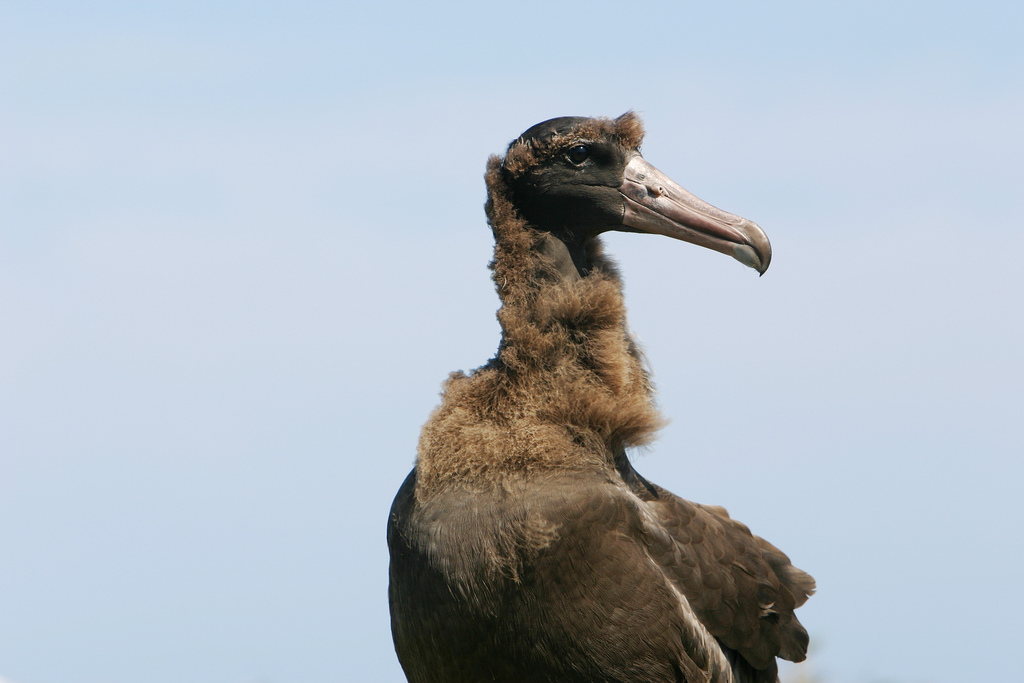
One of several chicks translocated to Muko-jima Island, Japan

The IUCN classifies this species as vulnerable, with an occurrence range of 34,800,000 km^{2} (13,400,000 sq mi) and a breeding range of 9 km^{2} (3.5 sq mi).

The short-tailed albatross came perilously close to extinction. They were hunted on an industrial scale for their feathers in the later half of the 19th century, with some estimates claiming upward of 10 million birds destroyed. By the 1930s, the only population left was on Torishima. Between 1927 and until 1933, hunting continued, when the Japanese government declared a ban to save the species, although by this time it was too late, the last albatrosses on the island has been killed. The species was assumed to be extinct and research became impossible with the outbreak of World War II. In 1949, an American researcher arriving on this island declared the species to be extinct, but an estimated 50 individuals, most likely juveniles, had survived at sea (all albatross species take a long time to reach sexual maturity and will not return to their natal colony for many years). After the return of the birds they were more carefully protected, and the first egg was laid by the returning birds in 1954. Varieties of albatross decoys were placed around on the island after it was discovered that like other albatross species, this species also were enticed to breed if placed in a group.

Between 2008 and 2012, the Ministry of the Environment relocated 70 albatross chicks from Tori-shima to Mukojima to breed them artificially.

Today, longline fisheries and volcanic eruptions on Tori-shima are the largest threats; however, introduced predators, environmental contaminants, soil instability, and extreme weather are also threats.

There are many measures underway to protect this species. Japan, Canada, and the United States list this bird as a protected species. Tori-shima is a National Wildlife Protection Area, and native plant species are being transplanted to assist in nesting. Also, most commercial longline fisheries use bycatch mitigation devices.

In 2017, a wild short-tailed albatross that had been born to an artificially-raised mother was confirmed to have returned to the Bonin Islands. This marks the first time a wild bird had returned to the islands in roughly 80 years. The bird was believed to have left its nest on Nakōdo-jima and flown north to Mukojima.

== Culture ==
In Japanese tradition the short-tailed albatross is known as ahodori (阿呆鳥, idiot bird), due to its insular breeding habits making it trusting towards terrestrial predators, such as humans.

== See also ==
- List of Special Places of Scenic Beauty, Special Historic Sites and Special Natural Monuments
