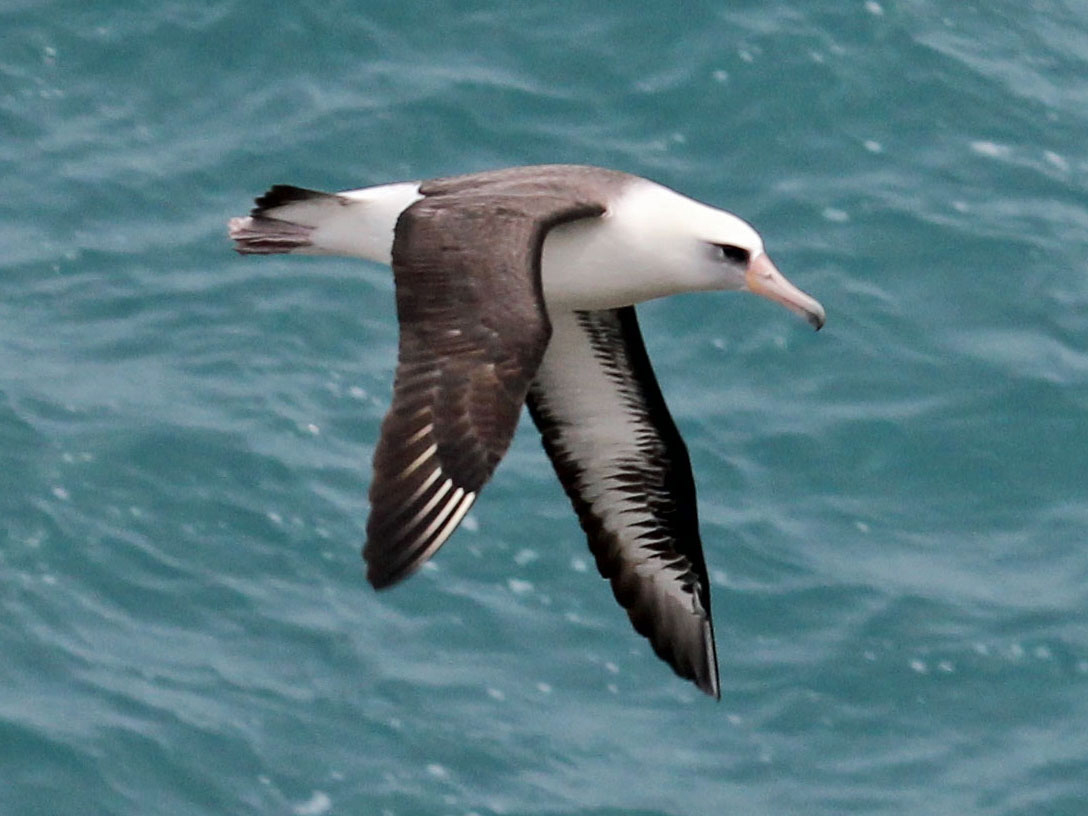

Conservation status
- Near Threatened (IUCN 3.1)

Scientific classification
- Kingdom: Animalia
- Phylum: Chordata
- Class: Aves
- Order: Procellariiformes
- Family: Diomedeidae
- Genus: Phoebastria
- Species: P. immutabilis

Binomial name
- Phoebastria immutabilis (Rothschild, 1893)

Synonyms
- Diomedea immutabilis

= Laysan albatross =

Species of marine bird

The Laysan albatross (Phoebastria immutabilis) is a large seabird that ranges across the North Pacific. The Northwestern Hawaiian Islands are home to 99.7% of the population. This small (for its family) gull-like albatross is the second-most common seabird in the Hawaiian Islands, with an estimated population of 1.18 million birds, and is currently expanding (or possibly re-expanding) its range to new islands. The Laysan albatross was first described as Diomedea immutabilis by Lionel Walter Rothschild, in 1893, on the basis of a specimen from Laysan Island.

== Etymology ==
It is named for Laysan, one of its breeding colonies in the Northwestern Hawaiian Islands and the island where the type specimen was collected. The genus name, Phoebastria, comes from Greek phoibastria, meaning a prophetess. The species name, immutabilis, is Latin for "unchanging" and refers to the similarity of immature birds' plumage to that of adults.

== Description ==
The Laysan albatross averages 81 cm (32 in) in length and has a wingspan of 195 to 203 cm (77–80 in). Males, which weigh 2.4 to 4.1 kg (5.3–9.0 lb), are larger than females, which weigh 1.9 to 3.6 kg (4.2–7.9 lb). This albatross has blackish-gray upperwing, mantle, back, upper rump, and tail, and its head, lower rump, and underparts are white. It has a black smudge around the eye, and its underwing pattern varies between individuals, with some having narrower black margins and variable amounts of black in the underwing coverts. Finally, the bill is pink with a dark tip. Juveniles have a gray bill and a dark upper rump. This species does not have a breeding plumage.

The Laysan albatross is usually easy to identify. In the North Pacific, it is simple to separate from the other relatively common albatross, the all black black-footed albatross. It can be distinguished from the very rare short-tailed albatross by its all-dark back and smaller size. The Laysan albatross's plumage has been compared to that of a gull, two-toned with a dark gray mantle and wings and a white underside and head.

== Distribution and habitat ==
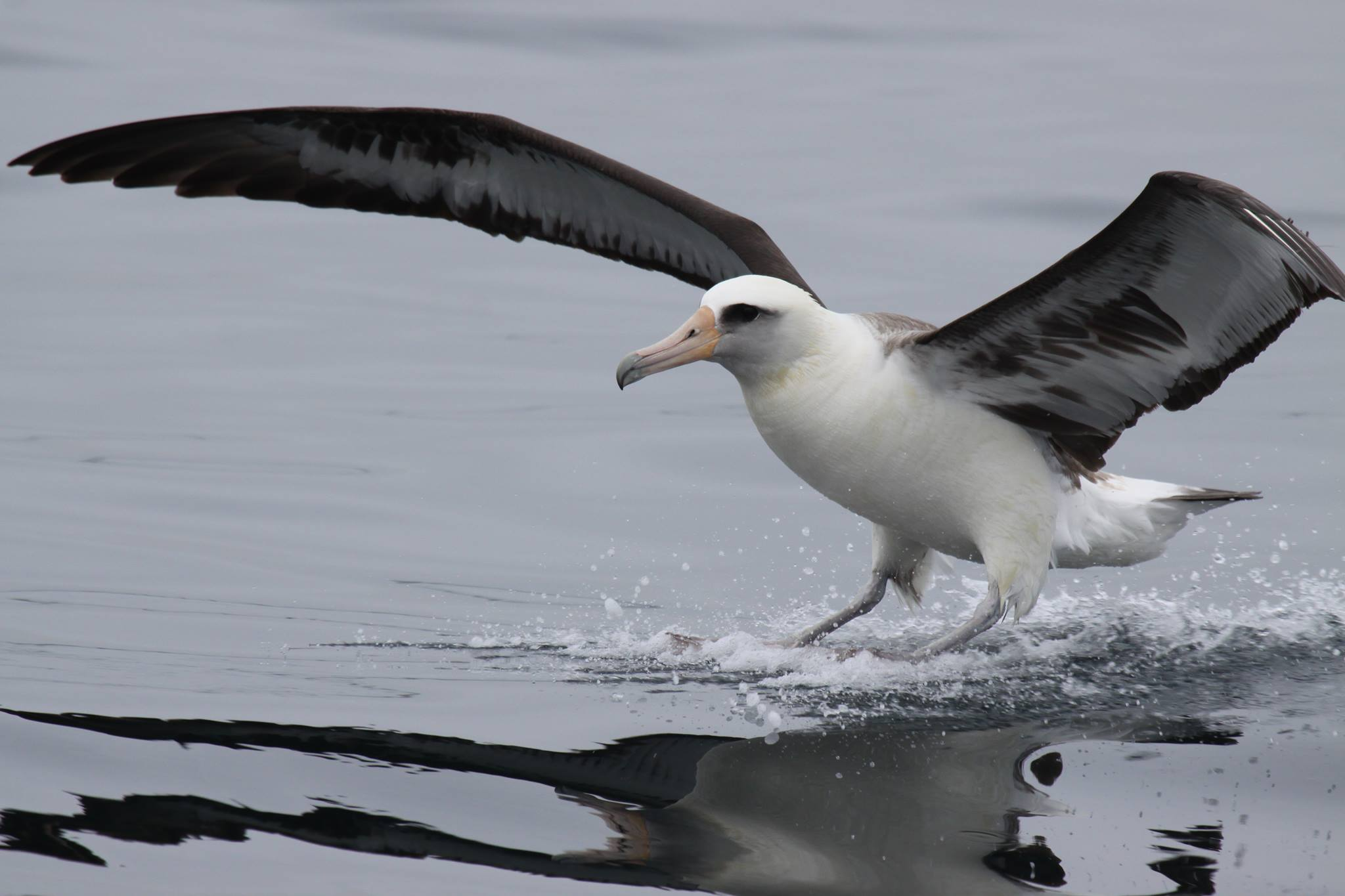
Laysan albatross landing on water near one of the Aleutian Islands in Alaska

The Laysan albatross has a wide range across the North Pacific, with 16 nesting sites. All but 0.3% of the breeding population is found among the Northwestern Hawaiian Islands, particularly the islands of Midway and Laysan. Small populations are found on the Bonin Islands near Japan and the bird has begun to colonize islands off Mexico, such as Guadalupe Island and others in the Revillagigedo Archipelago. The Laysan Albatross is protected in Guadalupe Island Biosphere Reserve. When away from the breeding areas, they range widely from Japan to the Bering Sea and south to 15°N.

== Behavior ==
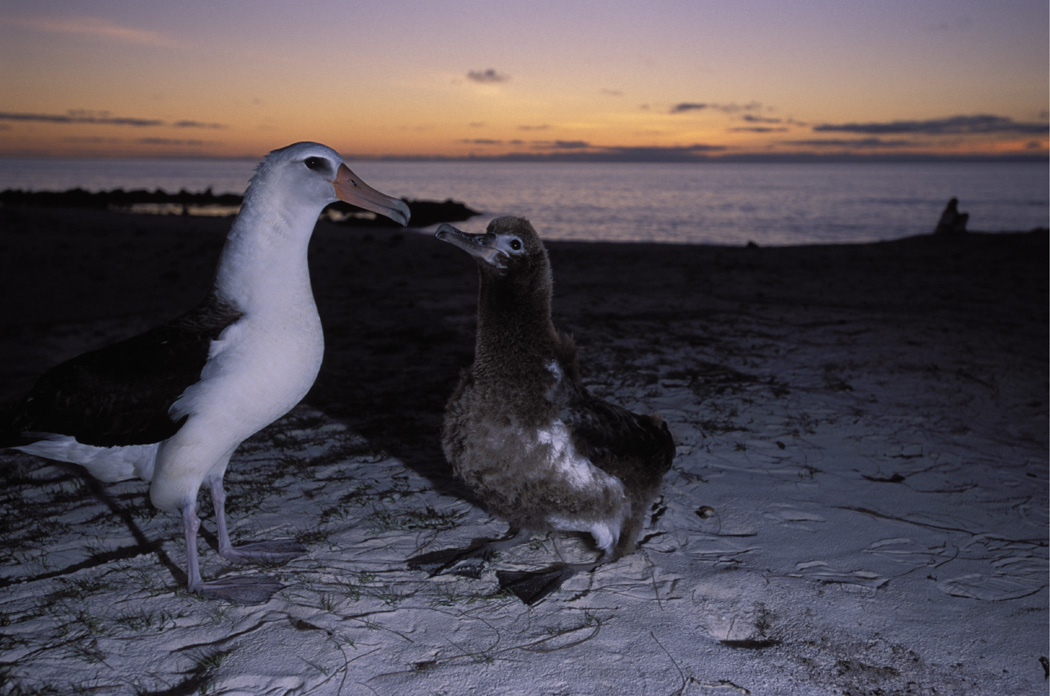
Laysan albatross with chick on Midway

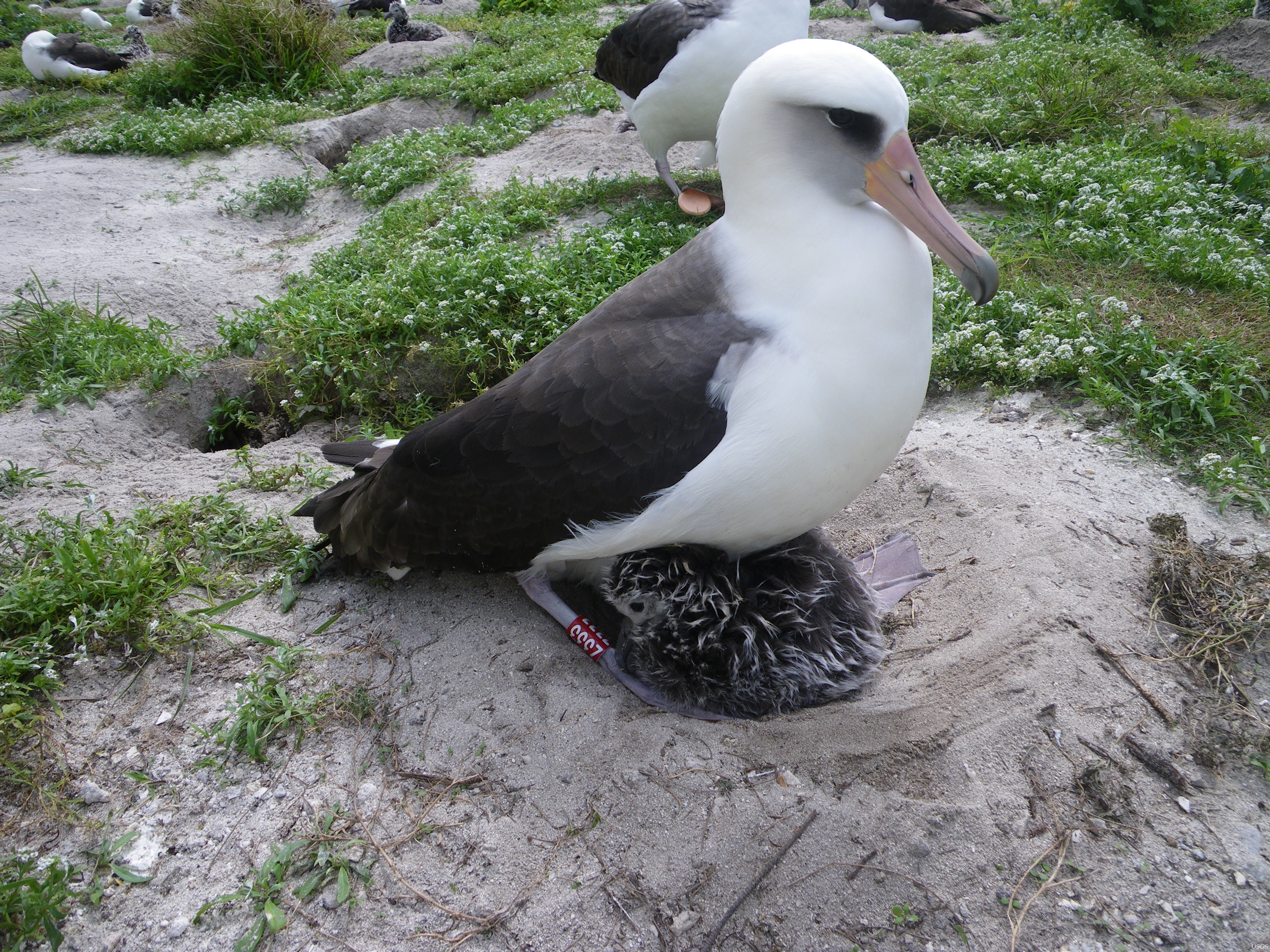
The then c. 60-year-old female named Wisdom with her chick, March 2011

The Laysan albatross is normally a silent bird, but on occasion may be observed emitting long "moo"-ing sounds, descending whinnies, or rattles. Female Laysan albatrosses may bond for life and cooperatively raise their young.

A female Laysan albatross named Wisdom is the oldest known wild bird in the world. Wisdom was banded by a U.S. Geological Survey researcher in 1956, and in December 1956, she was seen rearing a new chick on Midway Atoll. Because Laysan albatrosses cannot breed until they are five years old, as of 2016, Wisdom was estimated to be at least 66 years old. Wisdom's latest chick hatched on February 1, 2021, and her current estimated age is 74.

In December 2024, the U.S. Fish and Wildlife Service announced that Wisdom was observed at the Midway Atoll National Wildlife Refuge. Wisdom, first banded in 1956, laid an egg, marking her first in four years and estimated to be her 60th egg. Wisdom had been returning to the atoll with her long-term mate, Akeakamai, since 2006 for breeding. However, Akeakamai has yet to be observed in recent years, and Wisdom was seen interacting with another male during this visit.

=== Reproduction ===
Laysan albatrosses are colonial, nesting on scattered small islands and atolls, often in huge numbers, and building different styles of nests depending on the surroundings, ranging from simple scoops in the sand to nests using vegetation. They have a protracted breeding cycle, and breed annually, although some birds skip years. On Hawaiian Islands, breeding season typically lasts from November to July. Juvenile birds return to the colony three years after fledging, but do not mate for the first time until seven or eight years old. During these four or five years, they form pair bonds with a mate that they will keep for life. Courtship entails especially elaborate 'dances' that have up to 25 ritualized movements.

Occasionally, the birds form same-sex pairs consisting of two females. This has been observed in the colony on the Hawaiian island Oahu, where the sex ratio of male to female is 2 to 3 and 31% of all pairs are between females. Paired females can successfully breed when their eggs are fertilized by males. This phenomenon has been useful to conservation efforts in the Hawaiian Islands, where researchers have successfully swapped unfertilized eggs from female-female pairs with fertile eggs translocated from pairs nesting on military airfields and in other unsafe nesting areas. The female-female pairs then hatch and raise the foster chicks.

The single egg is buff-white and may have spots. In terms of size, this egg measures on average 10.7 cm × 6.8 cm (4.2 in × 2.7 in) in length and width, and 284 g (10.0 oz) in mass; older birds will typically lay larger eggs. Both birds incubate the egg; the male does so first. Incubation takes about 65 days, and is followed by several weeks of brooding, after which both parents are out at sea to provide for the growing chick. The chick takes about 160 days to fledge. This time investment by the parents may explain the long courtship; both parents want to be sure the other is serious. The chicks are fed regurgitated meals of very rich "stomach oil" and partially digested squid and fish by the parents.

The Laysan albatross and the black-footed albatross have been known to hybridize. Like all albatrosses, the Laysan albatross is known to be a long-living bird. The oldest known live bird, a female named Wisdom, was at least 70 years old as of 2021. In 2014, she hatched a healthy chick which is believed to be her 36th. The longest lifespan confirmed for a wild seabird was for a breeding male found to have been banded 53 years previously. Other albatross are thought to match or maybe even exceed this record, but few confirmations of very old albatrosses exist.

=== Feeding ===
The Laysan albatross feeds predominantly on cephalopods, but also eats fish, crustaceans, and other invertebrates.

== Conservation ==
Breeding population and trends
Breeding location	Breeding pairs	Trend
Midway Atoll	441,178	Stable from 1992 to 2005
Laysan Island	103,689	Stable from 1992 to 2005
French Frigate Shoals	7,073	Stable from 1992 to 2005
Other northwestern Hawaiian Islands		
Tori-shima (Izu Islands)	1,218	Unknown
Bonin Islands	23	Unknown
Islas Guadalupe	337	Increasing
Other offshore Mexican islands	63	Increasing
Total	590,926	−30 to 49% over 85 years

The IUCN had classified the Laysan albatross as vulnerable due to drastic reductions in populations, but the population may be rebounding. The IUCN now classifies the Laysan albatross as near threatened. The Laysan albatross, while a common species, has not yet recovered from the wide-scale hunting of the early 1900s, with feather hunters killing many hundreds of thousands and wiping them out from Wake Island and Johnston Atoll. This slaughter led to efforts to protect the species (and others) which led eventually to the protection of the Northwestern Hawaiian Islands.

The Laysan albatross has an occurrence range of 38,800,000 km^{2} (15,000,000 sq mi) and a breeding range of 3,500 km^{2} (1,400 sq mi) with a population of 1,180,000 mature birds estimated in 2006. Midway Atoll, Laysan Island, and the French Frigate Shoals have more than 90% of the breeding pairs at 551,940. Bonin Island has 23 pairs and offshore Mexico has about 400 pairs, with 337 pairs on Isla Guadalupe. The northwestern Hawaiian Islands have suffered a 32% reduction in breeders from 1992 to 2002. However, the last three years have had a rebound that stabilized the period between 1992 and 2005. This species was extirpated from Wake Atoll, Johnston Atoll, and Minami Torishima. The Mexican population has been increasing since its inception.

In the past, harvesting for feathers was a major threat, along with high-seas drift net, but both of these have ceased, barring some small-scale illegal drift net operations. Current threats today are the longline fisheries.

=== Midway Atoll ===
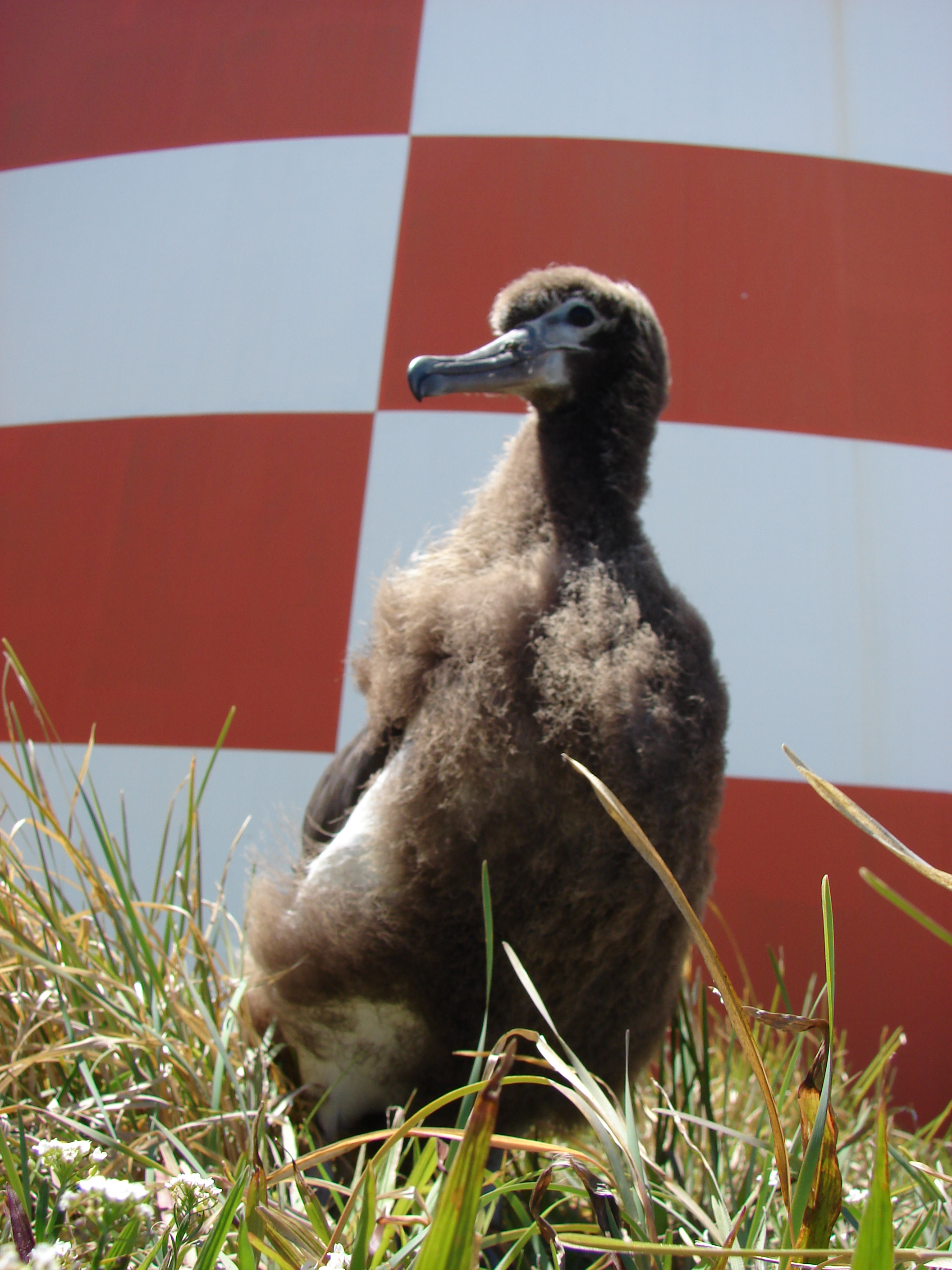
Chick, Midway Atoll

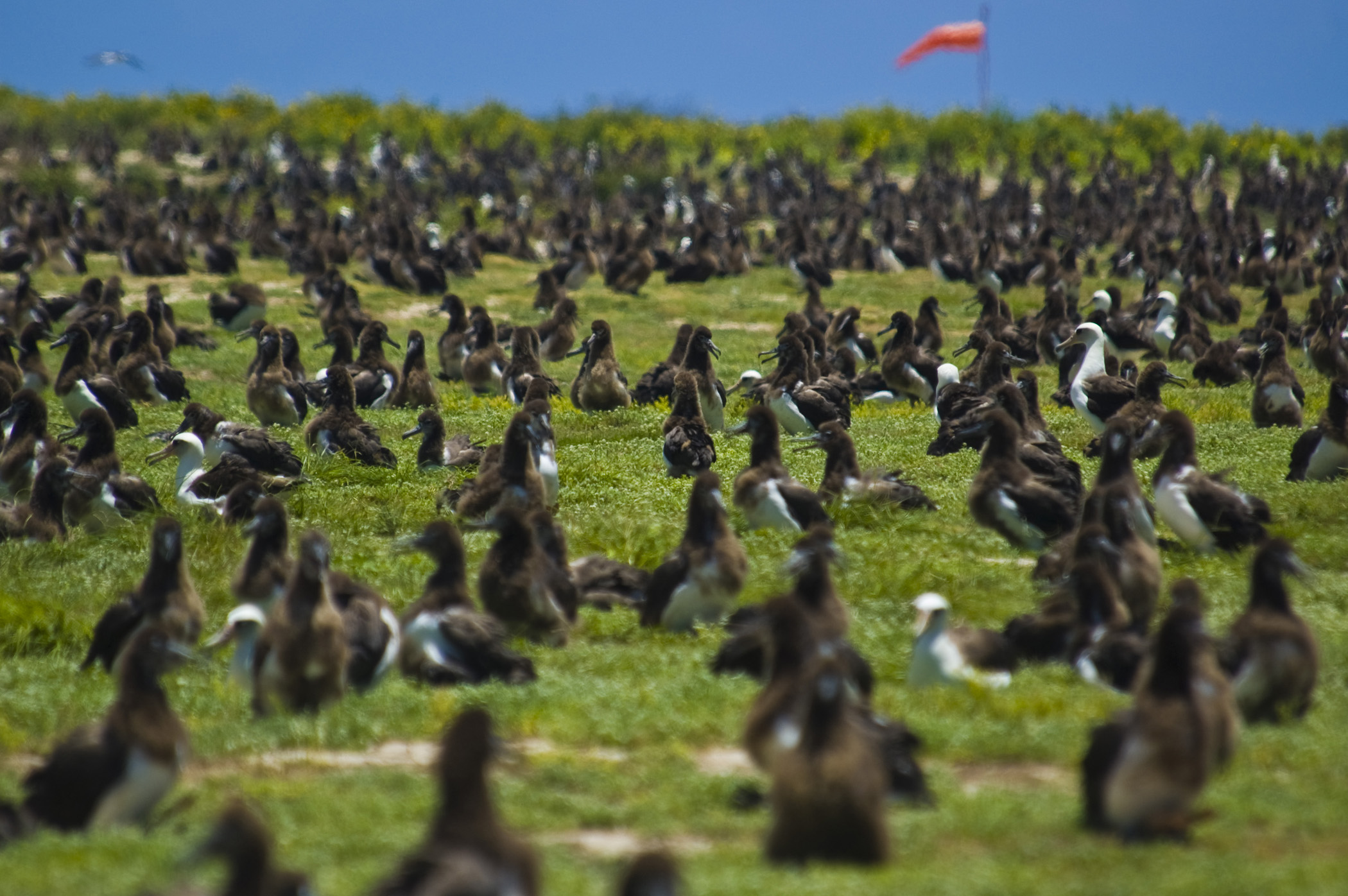
Laysan albatross rookery on Midway Atoll

A wide view of the Laysan albatross colony on Midway Atoll National Wildlife Refuge, at the northwestern edge of the Hawaiian archipelago, April 2, 2026

70% of the global population of Laysan albatrosses nest on Midway Atoll annually.

In October 2009, an estimated 10,000 Laysan albatrosses nesting on Midway Atoll, part of the Papahānaumokuākea Marine National Monument, were killed each year from lead poisoning. The Laysan albatross has been globally listed as vulnerable to extinction by the World Conservation Union and is a special trust species on the Midway Atoll National Wildlife Refuge in the recently established national monument.

"Laysan chicks raised in nests close to 90 buildings left behind by the Navy are ingesting lead-based paint chips. This is causing shockingly high lead concentrations in their blood, leading to severe neurological disorders, and eventual death," said George Fenwick, president of American Bird Conservancy. "Federal funds are urgently needed to clean up this toxic mess to protect the Laysan albatross, as well as future visitors to the new Marine National Monument." As many as 10,000 chicks, or 5% of hatched chicks, may be killed annually by exposure to lead-based paint. Many Laysan chicks that nest within 5 m of building structures exhibit a condition referred to as "droop wing", which commonly manifests itself in the chicks' inability to raise their wings, which then drag on the ground, resulting in broken bones, infestations of maggots, and open sores. Chicks with droop wing will never be able to fly and will die of starvation or dehydration. Other chicks in close proximity to buildings also suffer detrimental effects from lead exposure. These chicks have blood lead concentrations that cause immunological, neurological, and renal impairments, significantly decreasing their chances of survival.

The Department of the Interior (DOI) estimated that $22.9 million was needed to clean up the toxic lead paint on Midway Atoll. The 95 federally-owned government buildings would need to be stripped of all lead-based paint and sand areas surrounding these old buildings thoroughly sifted to remove lead paint chips. When American Bird Conservancy staff presented the severity of this growing threat to an already imperiled bird species to DOI officials, they were told that the new Northwestern Hawaiian Islands Marine National Monument did not have any federal funds dedicated to its operation. Moreover, the DOI officials stated that the current federal budget for the nation's wildlife refuge system would be insufficient to prevent the continued ingestion of lead paint by Laysan chicks.

In February 2010, the Center for Biological Diversity (CBD) announced an impending lawsuit against the United States Fish and Wildlife Service for violations of the Migratory Bird Treaty Act, the Endangered Species Act, and the Resource Conservation and Recovery Act. By September of that year, the Fish and Wildlife Service made plans to spend $1.4 million on cleaning the lead paint at the Midway Atoll military buildings, with plans to spend more than $21 million overall to removed paint chips from the soil and clean 71 buildings in total; the American Bird Conservancy reported that the clean-up would begin by July 2011. In 2011, the Fish and Wildlife Service announced its plans to begin the clean up of lead-based paint at federal facilities. By 2016, more than 20,000 cubic yards of lead-contaminated soil had been treated. In August 2018, Midway Atoll was declared lead-free after a long campaign of remediating the buildings and soils.

== Gallery ==
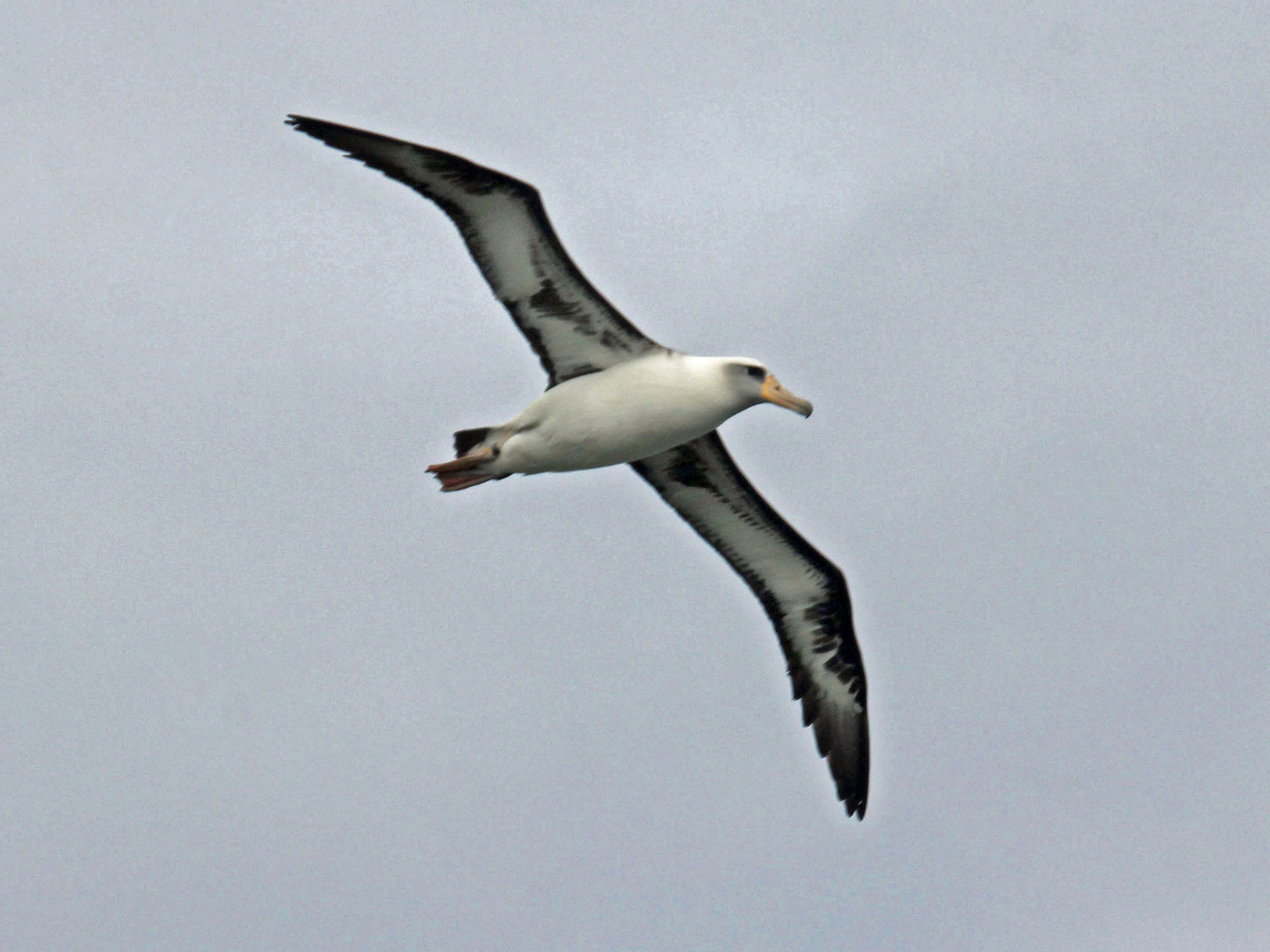
At Kilauea Point on Kauai, Hawaii

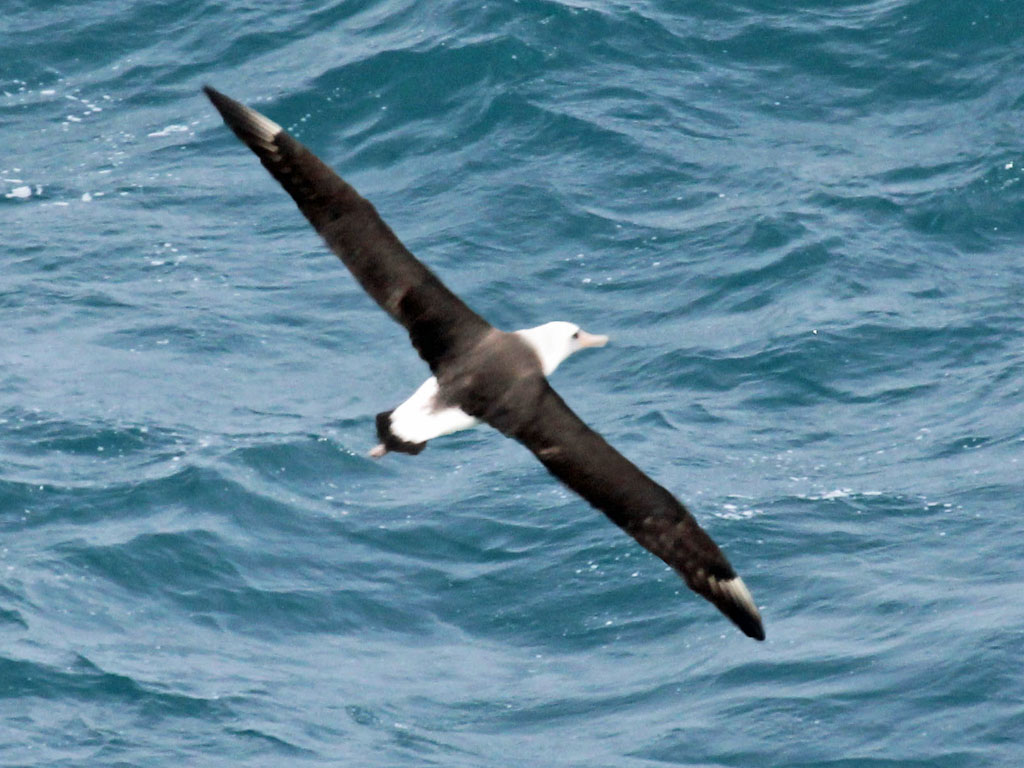
At Kilauea Point on Kauai, Hawaii

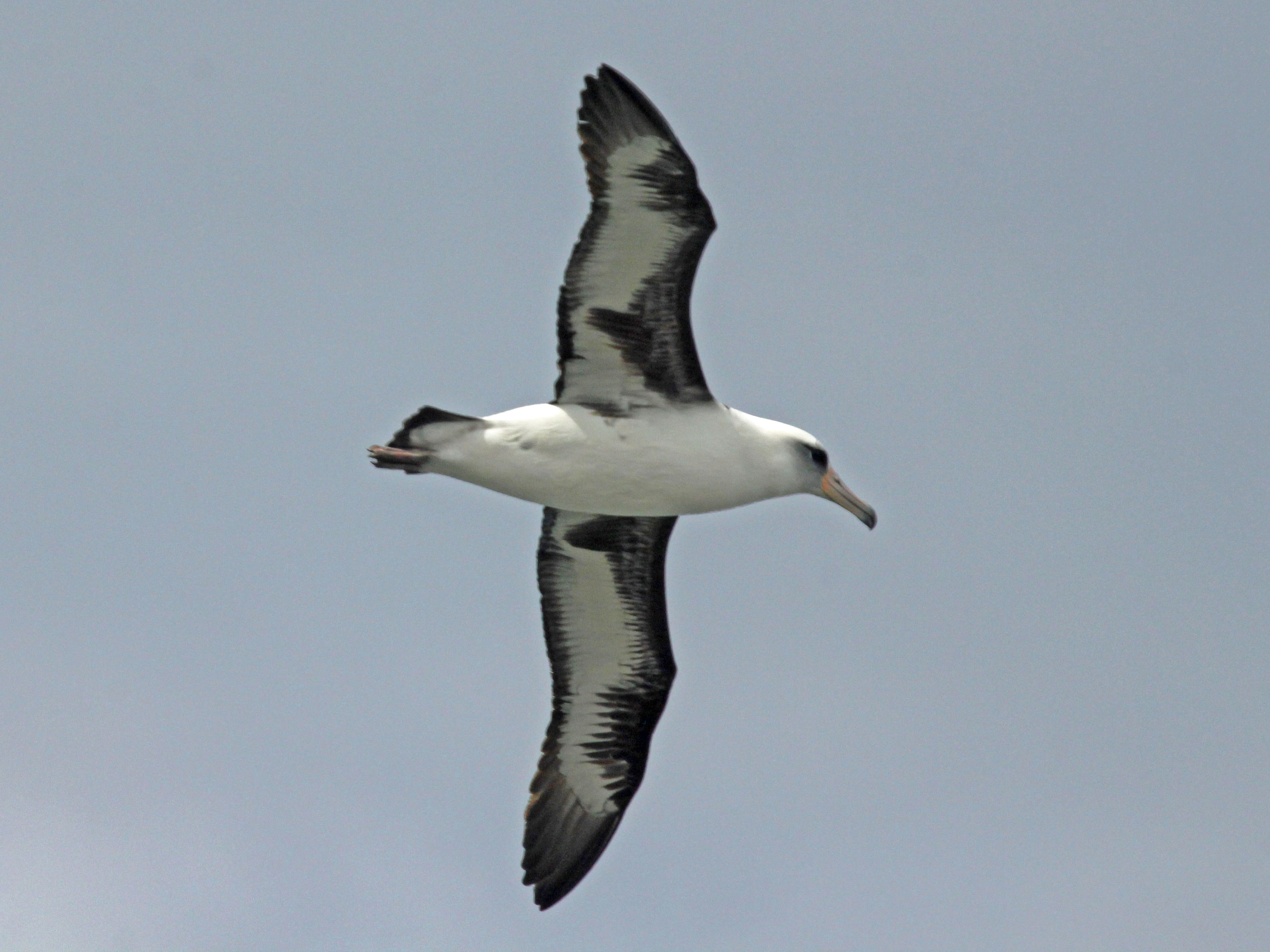
At Kilauea Point on Kauai, Hawaii

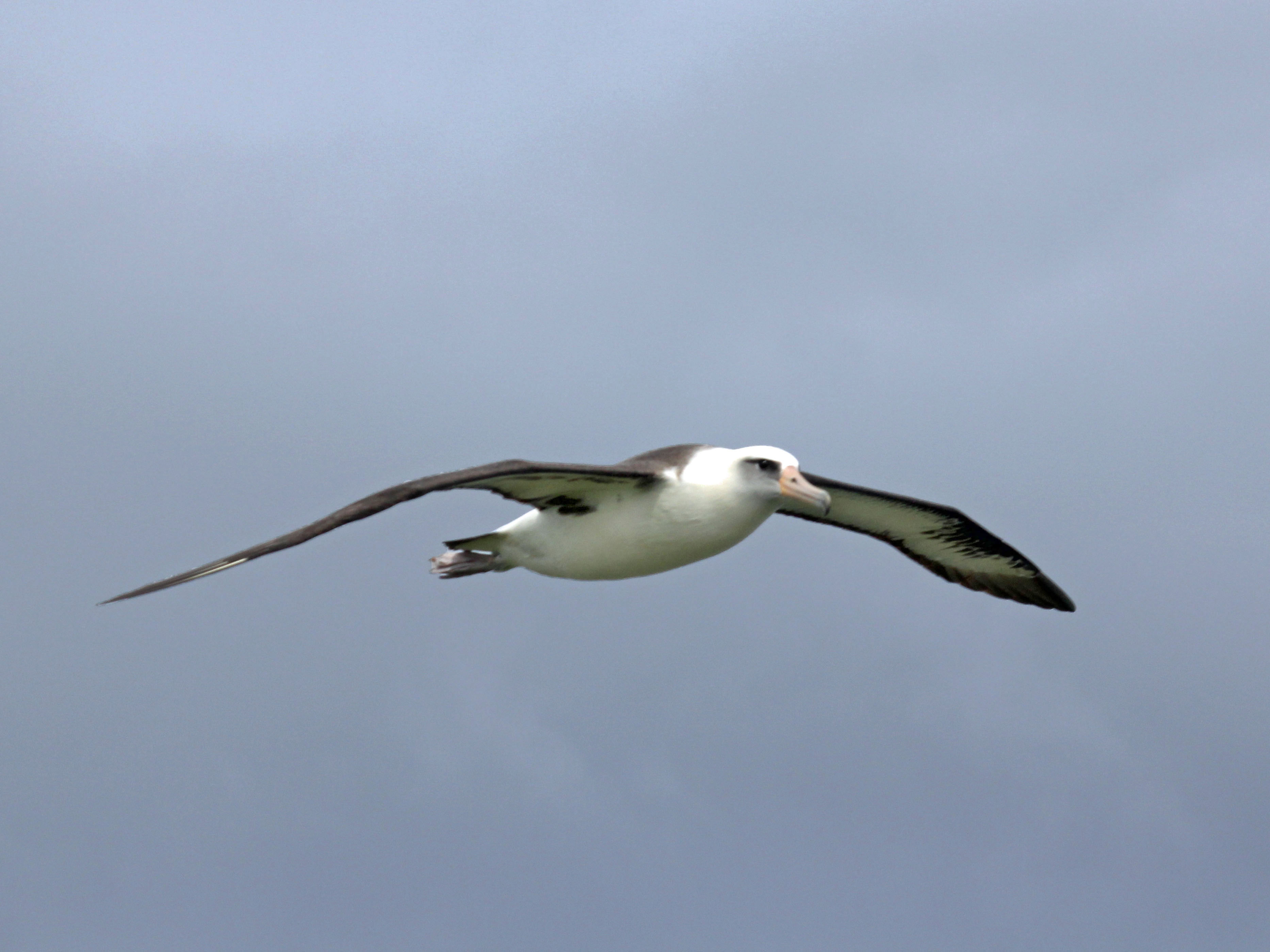
At Kilauea Point on Kauai, Hawaii

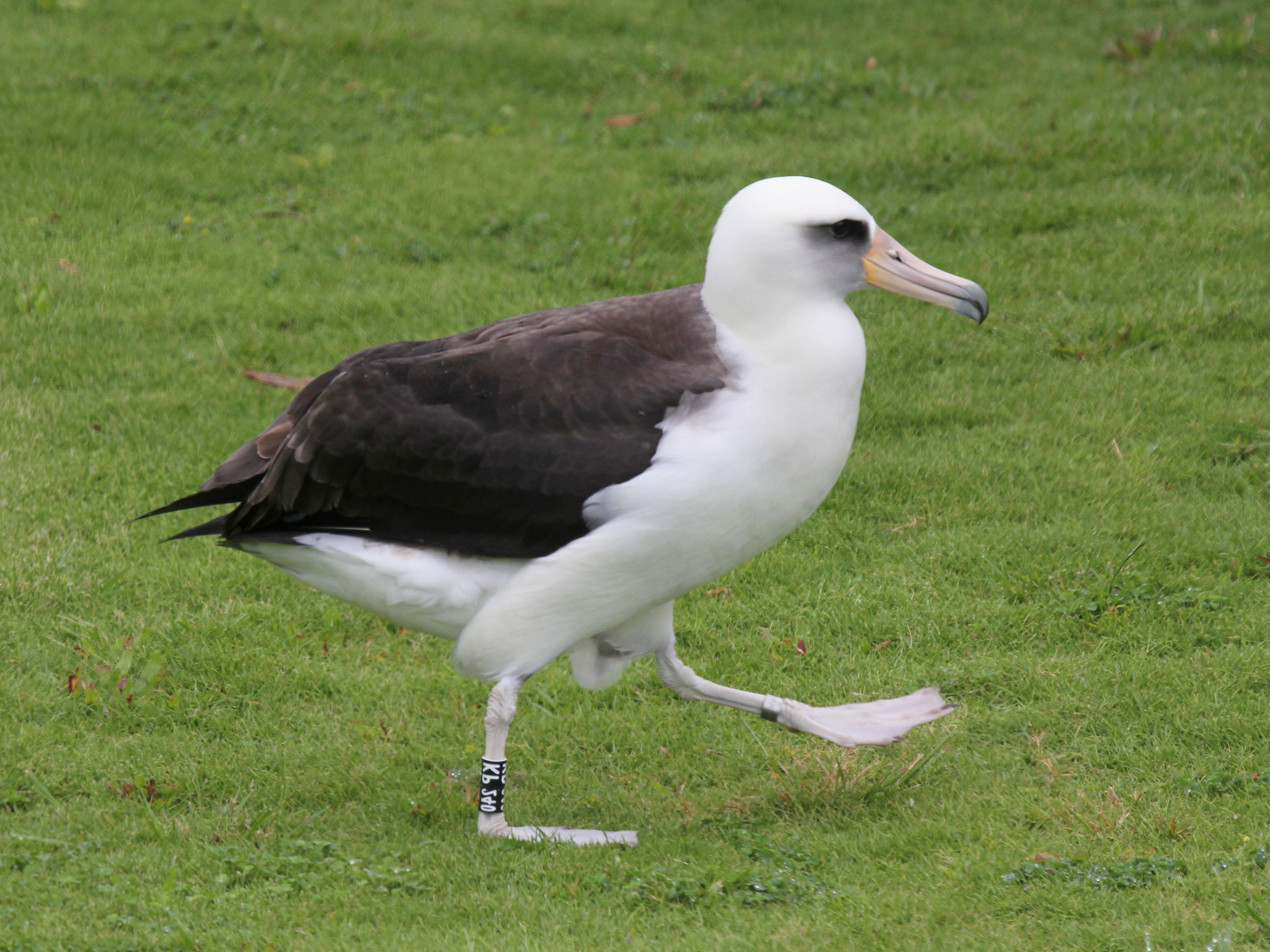
At Princeville, Hawaii

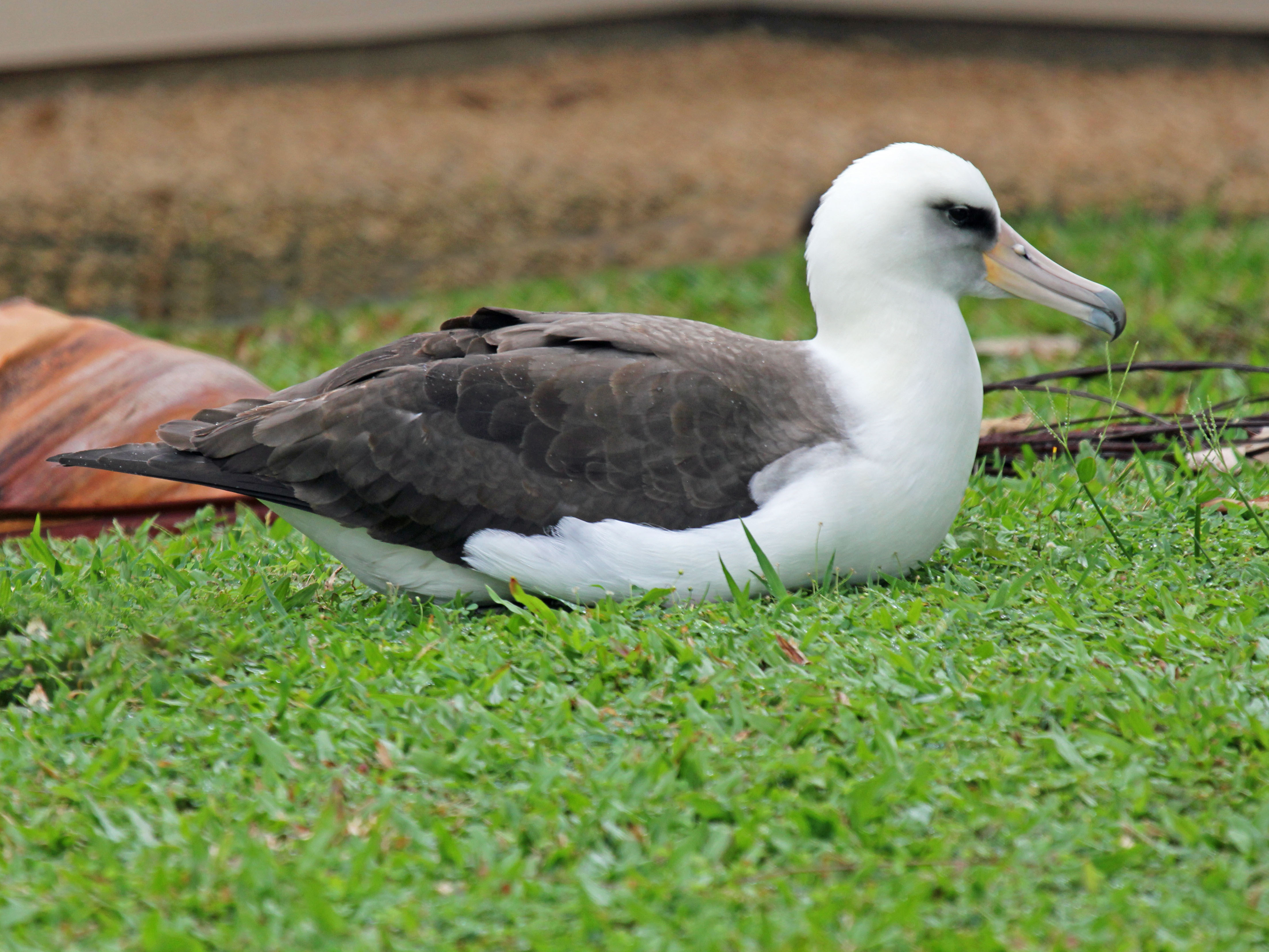
At Princeville, Hawaii

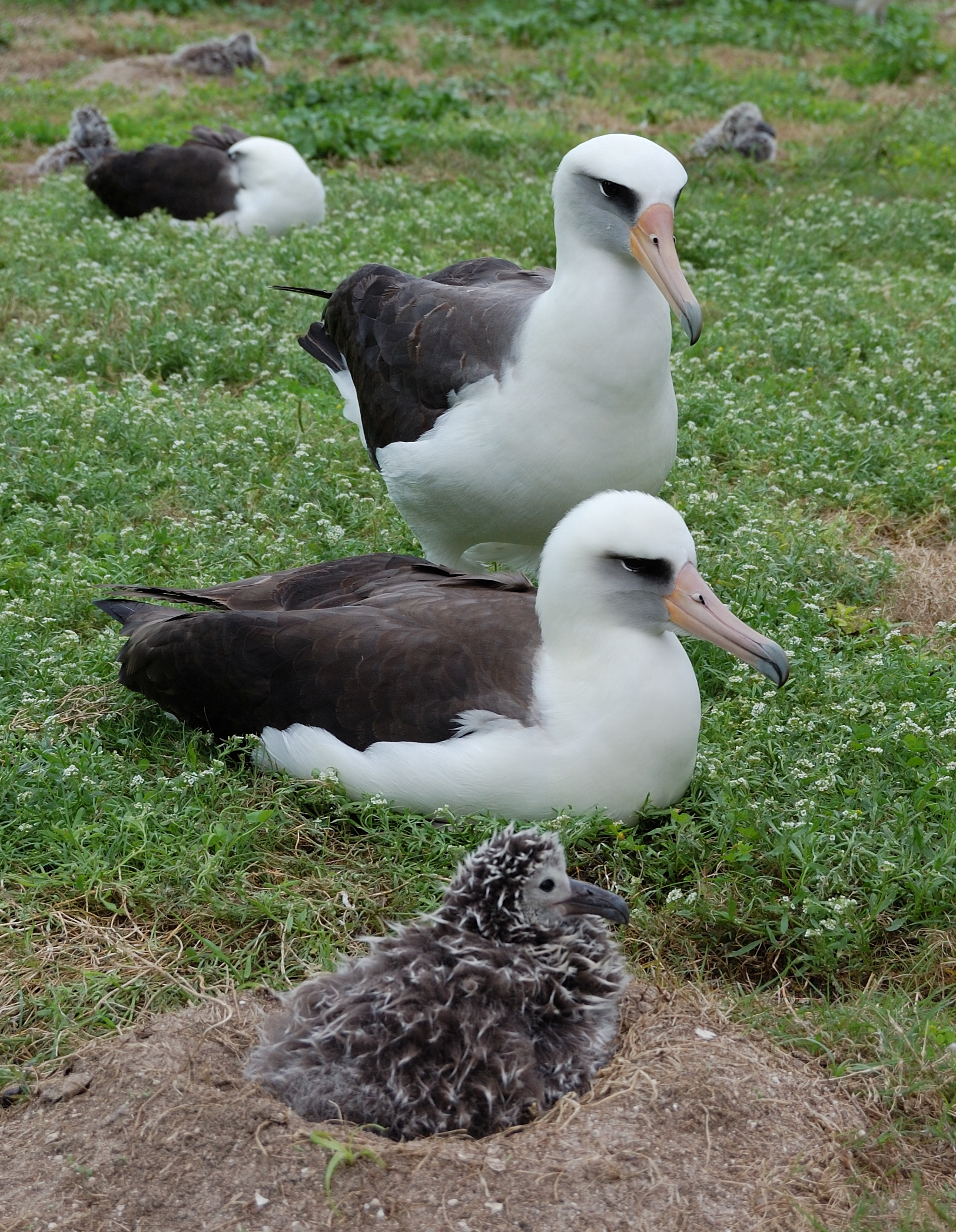

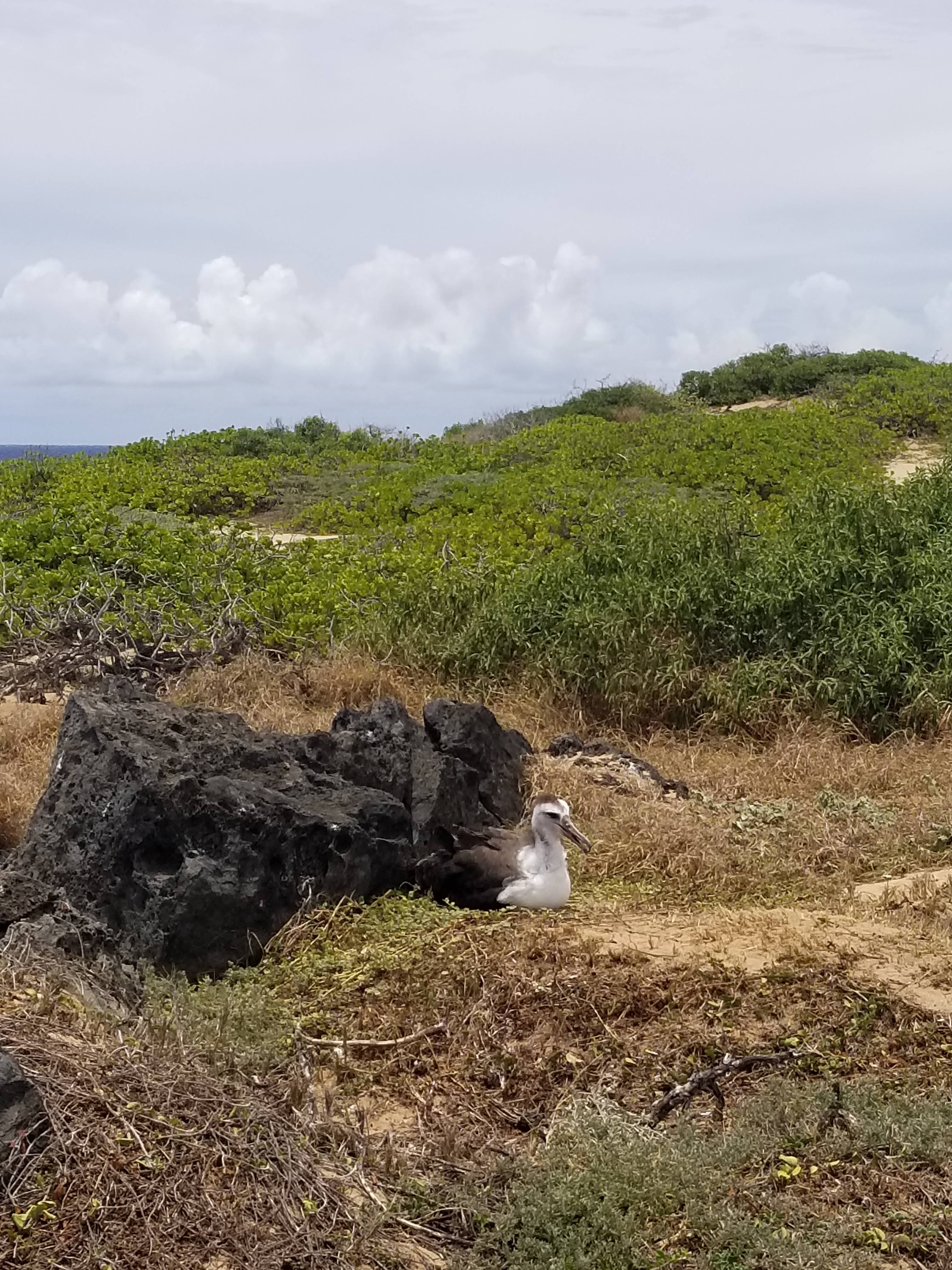
At Kaʻena Point State Park, Hawaii
