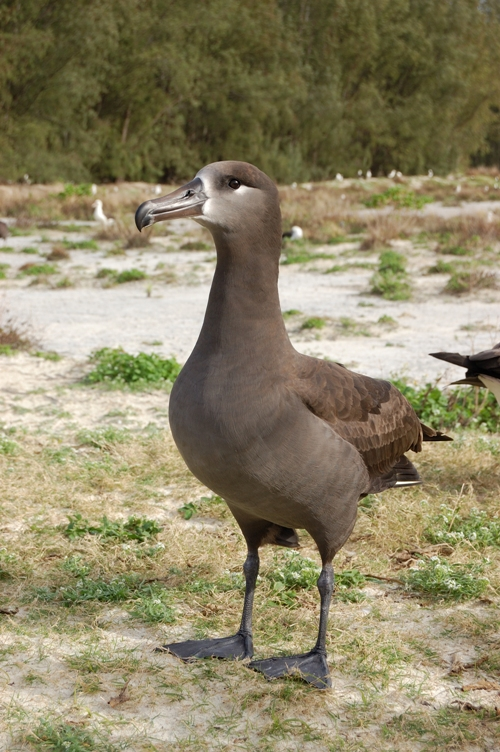

Conservation status
- Near Threatened (IUCN 3.1)

Scientific classification
- Kingdom: Animalia
- Phylum: Chordata
- Class: Aves
- Order: Procellariiformes
- Family: Diomedeidae
- Genus: Phoebastria
- Species: P. nigripes

Binomial name
- Phoebastria nigripes (Audubon, 1839)

Synonyms
- Diomedea nigripes

= Black-footed albatross =

Species of marine bird

The black-footed albatross (Phoebastria nigripes) is a large seabird of the albatross family Diomedeidae from the North Pacific. All but 2.5% of the population is found among the Northwestern Hawaiian Islands. It is one of three species of albatross that range in the Northern Hemisphere, nesting on isolated tropical islands. Unlike many albatrosses, it is dark plumaged.

== Taxonomy ==
Black-footed albatrosses are a type of albatross that belong to family Diomedeidae of the order Procellariiformes, along with shearwaters, fulmars, storm petrels, and diving petrels. They share certain identifying features. First, they have nasal passages that attach to the upper bill called naricorns. Although the nostrils on the albatross are on the sides of the bill. The bills of Procellariiformes are also unique in that they are split into between seven and nine horny plates. Finally, they produce a stomach oil made up of wax esters and triglycerides that is stored in the proventriculus. This is used both against predators and as an energy rich food source for chicks and for the adults during their long flights. They also have a salt gland that is situated above the nasal passage that helps desalinate their bodies, to compensate for the high amount of ocean water that they imbibe. It excretes a high saline solution from their nose.

The specific epithet of nigripes is derived from two Latin words, niger meaning "black", and pes meaning "foot".

== Description ==
The black-footed albatross is a small member of the albatross family (while still large compared to most other seabirds) that has almost all black plumage. Some adults show white undertail coverts, and all adults have white markings around the base of the beak and below the eye. As the birds age they acquire more white at the base of the beak. Its beak and feet are also all dark. They have only the one plumage. They measure 68 to 74 cm (27–29 in), have a wingspan of 190 to 220 cm (6.2–7.2 ft), and weigh 2.6–4.3 kg (5.7–9.5 lb). Males, at an average weight of 3.4 kg (7.5 lb) are larger than females, at an average of 3 kg (6.6 lb).

== Distribution and habitat ==
The black-footed albatross, along with the Laysan albatross and the rare short-tailed albatross, are the three species of albatross that range in the Northern Hemisphere, as opposed to the rest of the family which range from the Equator south. There are at least 12 known breeding locations, but 97.5% of the total population is found colonially on the isolated Northwestern Hawaiian Islands, from Kure Atoll to Kaʻula Island, (such as Laysan, Midway, and the French Frigate Shoals). Small populations can be found on the Japanese islands of Tori Shima, Bonin, and Senkaku, and off the Mexican coast, primarily on Isla Guadalupe. They are extirpated from the Iwo Jima, Agrihan, Taongi Atoll, Marcus Island, Wake Island, and Johnston Island. Their range at sea varies during the seasons (straying farther from the breeding islands when the chicks are older or they do not have chicks) but they make use of great areas of the North Pacific, feeding from Alaska to California and Japan; however, they do prefer the northeastern Pacific Ocean. They overlap greatly in breeding and feeding range with the other two species of northern albatross, although the other two will range further north into the Bering Sea than the Black-footed will. They have, on occasion, been sighted in the Southern Hemisphere.

== Behavior ==
Their vocalizations range from shrieks and squeals while fighting over food to bill-clapping, whistles, groans, and quacks while courting.

=== Breeding ===
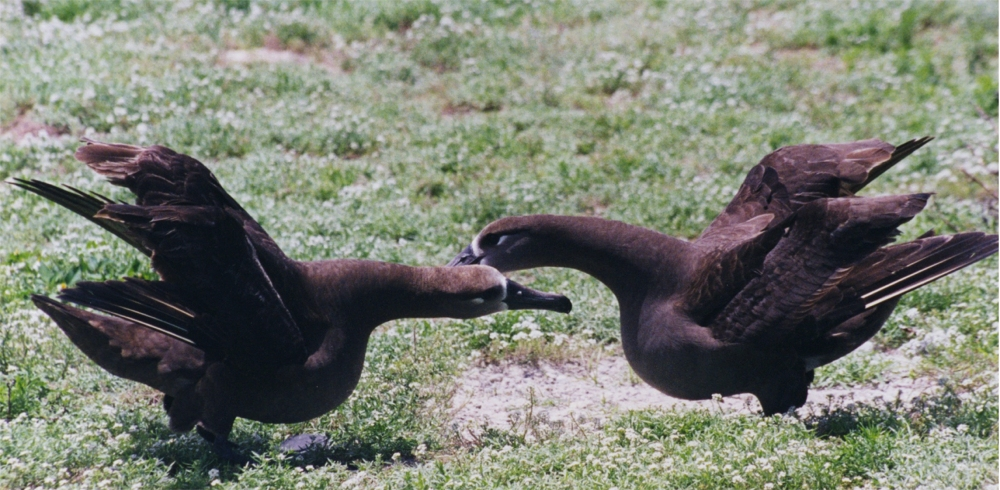
Black-footed albatross dancing

The black-footed albatross, like the rest of its family, forms long term pair-bonds that last for life. After fledging the birds return to the colony after three years, and spend two years building nests, dancing and being with prospective mates, a behaviour that probably evolved to ensure maximum trust between the birds (raising an albatross chick is a massive energetic investment, and a long courting period establishes for both birds that the other is committed). They will start reproducing after about seven years, mating every two years.

Nests are simple depressions scraped in the sand, into which one dull white with reddish brown spots egg is laid. Eggs of this species measure 10.8 cm (4.3 in) in length and 7 cm (2.8 in) in width, with a mass of 304 g (10.7 oz). The egg is incubated for just over two months (65 days). Both birds incubate the egg, the male incubating more as the female leaves soon after hatching to recoup reserves used for egg-laying. The average time spent on incubating shifts is 18 days. However, mates can wait up to 38 days to be relieved, and if something happens to the mate the other has been recorded incubating for 49 days without food or water.

The chick is brooded for 20 days by its parents, after which both parents leave the nest and return to feed the chick. The chick is fed regurgitated food by sticking its bill inside that of its parent. Fledging occurs after 140 days.

=== Feeding ===
The black-footed albatross feeds in pelagic waters, taking the eggs of flying fish, live fish, fish offal, squid and to a lesser extent crustaceans. It will also consume floating debris, including plastics.

== Conservation ==
Breeding population and trends
Breeding location	Breeding pairs	Trend
Midway Atoll	24,000	-9.6% from 1992 to 2001
Laysan Island	21,000	-9.6% from 1992 to 2001
French Frigate Shoals	17,895	-9.6% from 1992 to 2001
Torishima	1,218	Unknown
Bonin Islands	23	Unknown
Islas Guadalupe	337	Unknown
Other offshore Mexican islands	63	unknown
Total	64,500	-60% over 56 years

The black-footed albatross is considered near threatened by the IUCN, because it is taken incidentally by longline fishing. An estimated 4,000 are taken every year (based on the number that were taken in 1990); other estimates put the number at 8,000, although more recent estimates are at around 6,150 per year, with the majority of deaths caused by Taiwanese and Japanese fishing fleets. It is also vulnerable to oil pollution in the water, and to the ingestion of floating plastics, which reduces the space in the stomach available for food to be brought to its chicks. Volcanic eruptions on Torishima also continue to pose a threat.

The black-footed albatross has an occurrence range of 37,600,000 km^{2} (14,500,000 sq mi) and a breeding range of 28 km^{2} (11 sq mi), with a population of 129,000 adult birds. Of these birds, 24,000 pairs breed on Midway Atoll and 21,000 pairs breed on Laysan Island. Torishima has 1,218 pairs, the Bonin Islands have 23 pairs and there are about 400 pairs on offshore Mexican islands (337 of those are on Guadalupe Island). (All these numbers are based on estimates made from 2005 to 2007).

All of its nesting sites in the U.S. are protected, along with a 50 nmi (93 km) buffer zone around these islands. Within this buffer zone, longline fishing is outlawed. Almost 80% of the breeding population is counted or sampled each year, and most fisheries take measures to prevent seabird bycatch.
