= Phoebastria rexsularum =

Phoebastria rexsularum Temporal range: Early Pliocene

Scientific classification
- Kingdom: Animalia
- Phylum: Chordata
- Class: Aves
- Order: Procellariiformes
- Family: Diomedeidae
- Genus: Phoebastria
- Species: P. rexsularum

Binomial name
- Phoebastria rexsularum Olson & Rasmussen, 2001

Extinct species of bird

Phoebastria rexsularum is an extinct species of Phoebastria that lived during the Zanclean stage of the Pliocene epoch.

== Distribution ==
Phoebastria rexsularum is known from the Yorktown Formation of North Carolina.
