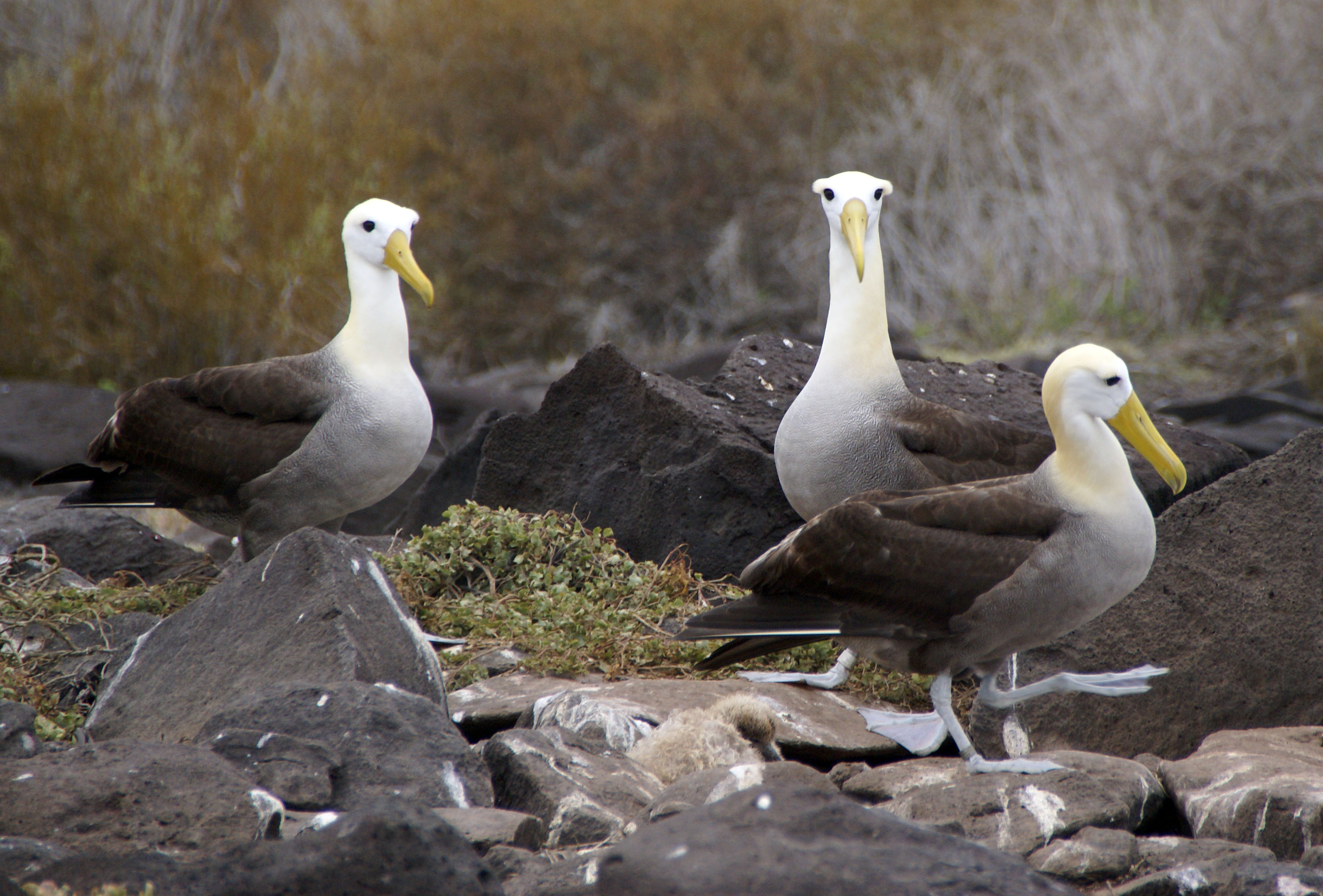
- Waved albatrosses on Española Island, Galapagos

Scientific classification
- Kingdom: Animalia
- Phylum: Chordata
- Class: Aves
- Order: Procellariiformes
- Family: Diomedeidae
- Genus: Phoebastria; Reichenbach, 1853

Type species
- Diomedea brachyura Temminck, 1829

Species
- Phoebastria immutabilis Phoebastria nigripes Phoebastria irrorata Phoebastria albatrus †Phoebastria californica †Phoebastria anglica †Phoebastria rexsularum †Phoebastria cf. albatrus †Phoebastria cf. immutabilis †Phoebastria cf. nigripes

Synonyms
- Diomedea (sensu Coues, 1866); Julietata Mathews & Hallstrom, 1943

= North Pacific albatross =

Genus of birds

The North Pacific albatrosses are large seabirds from the genus Phoebastria in the albatross family. They are the most tropical of the albatrosses, with two species (the Laysan and black-footed albatrosses) nesting in the Northwestern Hawaiian Islands, one on sub-tropical islands south of Japan (the short-tailed albatross), and one nesting on the equator (the waved albatross).

== Taxonomy ==
Their taxonomy is very confusing, as with all albatrosses. It is widely accepted now, based on molecular evidence and the fossil record, that they are a distinct genus from Diomedea in which formerly most "white" albatrosses were placed but which is now restricted to the "great" albatrosses. They share certain identifying features. First, they have nasal passages that attach to the upper bill called naricorns. Although the nostrils on the albatross are on the sides of the bill. The bills of Procellariiformes are also unique in that they are split into between seven and nine horny plates. Finally, they produce a stomach oil made up of wax esters and triglycerides that is stored in the proventriculus. This is used against predators as well as an energy rich food source for chicks and for the adults during their long flights. They also have a salt gland that is situated above the nasal passage and that helps desalinate their bodies, to compensate for the high amount of ocean water that they imbibe. It excretes a high saline solution from their nose.

=== Species ===
Genus Phoebastria – North Pacific albatrosses

Genus Phoebastria – Reichenbach, 1853 – four species
| Common name | Scientific name and subspecies | Range | Size and ecology | IUCN status and estimated population |
|---|---|---|---|---|
| Laysan albatross | Phoebastria immutabilis (Rothschild, 1893) | Northwestern Hawaiian Islands, particularly the islands of Midway and Laysan | Size: Habitat: Diet: | NT |
| Black-footed albatross | Phoebastria nigripes (Audubon, 1839) | Northwestern Hawaiian Islands, from Kure Atoll to Kaula Island | Size: Habitat: Diet: | NT |
| Waved albatross | Phoebastria irrorata (Salvin, 1883) | Ecuador and Peru | Size: Habitat: Diet: | CR |
| Short-tailed albatross | Phoebastria albatrus (Pallas, 1769) | North Pacific | Size: Habitat: Diet: | VU |

This genus and Diomedea had already diverged in the Middle Miocene (12–15 mya). Several fossil forms are known, which incidentally prove that Phoebastria was formerly distributed in the North Atlantic also. The current distribution is thus a relict. The oldest known species, P. californica, was at least the size of the short-tailed albatross and may have been an ancestor of that bird.

Fossil species

- Phoebastria californica (Temblor Middle Miocene of Sharktooth Hill, US)
- Phoebastria anglica (Middle Pliocene – Early Pleistocene of NC Atlantic coasts)
- Phoebastria cf. albatrus (Late Pliocene of San Diego County, US) – formerly Diomedea howardae
- Phoebastria rexsularum (Early Pliocene of North Carolina, US)
- Phoebastria cf. immutabilis (Pleistocene of San Pedro, US)
- Phoebastria cf. nigripes (Pleistocene of San Pedro, US)

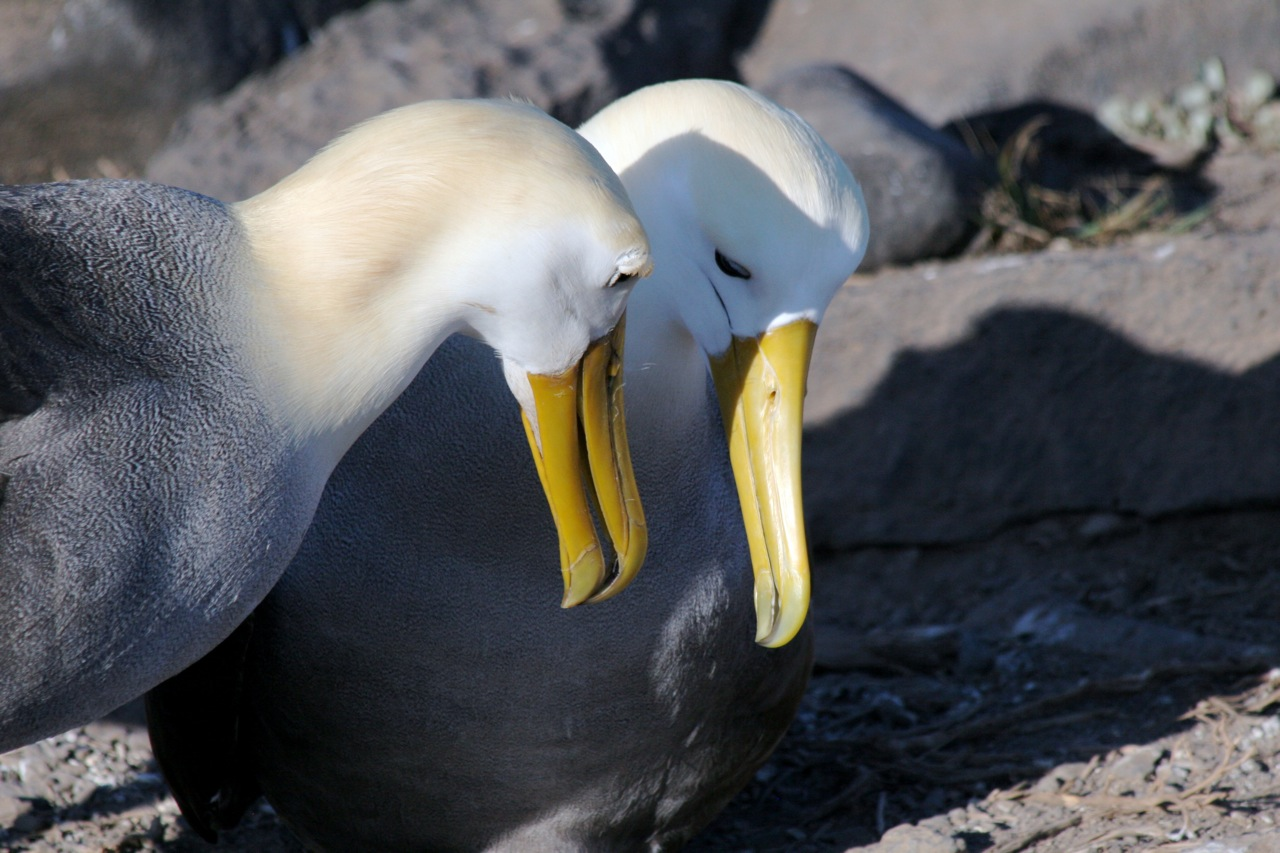
Waved albatross pair

== Description ==
The North Pacific albatross ranges in wingspan from 190 to 240 cm (75–94 in) and they all have short black tails.

== Behavior ==
The feeding habits of these albatrosses are similar to other albatrosses in that they eat fish, squid, crustaceans, and carrion.

Observations made during June 2010 from the Hokkaido University research vessel the Oshoro Maru in the western North Pacific showed an apparent symbiotic relationship between a school of 57 ocean sunfish (Mola mola) and Laysan and black-footed albatrosses. The sunfish were infected with the mesoparasitic copepods from the genus Pennella and the albatrosses were seen to remove these parasites from the sunfish which appeared to be actively attempting to attract the albatrosses.

When roosting, they choose isolated sites and lay one egg, with both parents incubating and raising the chick. They are monogamous species, and they do not start breeding until they are 5–15 years old.

== See also ==
- List of albatross breeding locations
