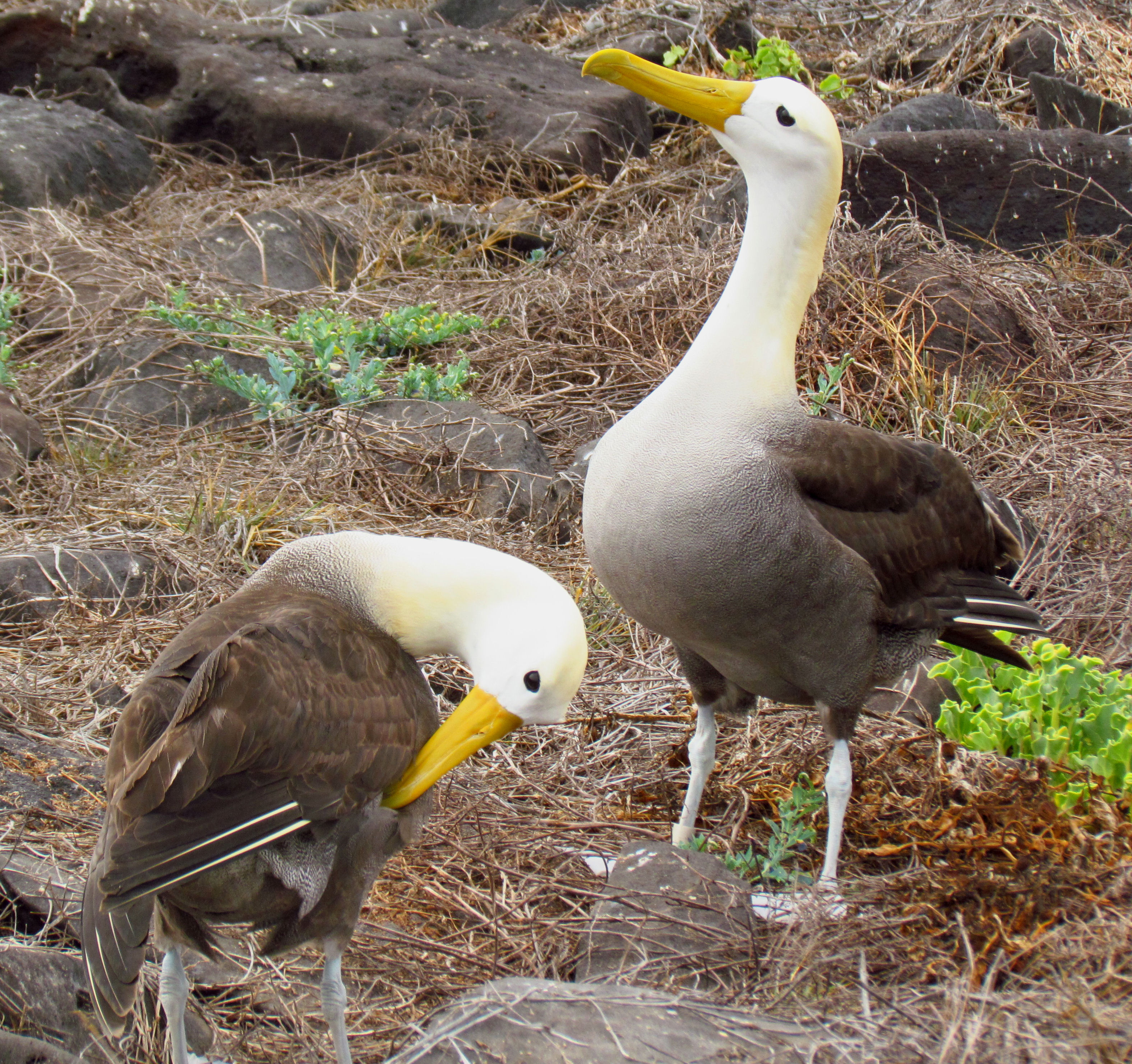
- Mated pair on Española Island, Ecuador

Conservation status
- Critically Endangered (IUCN 3.1)

Scientific classification
- Kingdom: Animalia
- Phylum: Chordata
- Class: Aves
- Order: Procellariiformes
- Family: Diomedeidae
- Genus: Phoebastria
- Species: P. irrorata

Binomial name
- Phoebastria irrorata (Salvin, 1883)

Synonyms
- Diomedea irrorata

= Waved albatross =

Species of marine bird

The waved albatross (Phoebastria irrorata), also known as Galapagos albatross, is one of three species of the family Diomedeidae that occur in the tropics. When they forage, they follow a straight path to a single site off the coast of Peru, about 1,000 km (620 mi) to the east. During the non-breeding season, these birds reside primarily on the Ecuadorian and Peruvian coasts.

== Taxonomy ==
Waved albatrosses are a species of albatross belonging to family Diomedeidae of the order Procellariiformes, along with shearwaters, fulmars, storm petrels, and diving petrels. They share certain identifying features. First, they have nasal passages that attach to the upper bill called naricorns, although the nostrils of the albatross are on the sides of the bill. The bills of Procellariiformes are also unique in that they are split into between seven and nine horny plates.

They produce a stomach oil made up of wax esters and triglycerides that is stored in the proventriculus. This is used against predators and as an energy rich food source for chicks and for the adults during their long flights. They also have a salt gland that is situated above the nasal passage and helps desalinate their bodies, due to the high amount of ocean water that they imbibe. It excretes a high saline solution from their nose.

== Etymology ==
The waved albatross derives its name from the wave-like pattern of the feathers on adult birds.

== Description ==
These are medium-sized albatrosses, measuring 80 to 90 cm (31 to 35 in) in length with a wingspan of 220–250 cm (7.2–8.2 ft). They range between 2.7 and 4.0 kg (6.0 and 8.8 lb) in mass, with males averaging significantly heavier than females. They are distinctive for their yellowish-cream neck and head, which contrasts with their mostly brownish bodies. Even more distinctive is the very long, bright yellow bill, which looks disproportionately large in comparison to the relatively small head and long, slender neck. They also have chestnut brown upper parts and underparts, except for the breast, with fine barring, a little coarser on the rump. They have brown upper-wings, back, and tail, along with a whitish breast and underwings. Their axillaries are brown. Finally they have bluish feet. Juveniles are similar to adults except for more white on their head. Chicks have brown fluffy feathers. The lifespan of this species may reach 40 to 45 years.

== Range ==
The waved albatross breeds primarily on Española Island in the Galápagos archipelago; however, there have been sightings of non-breeders and therefore possible small numbers, around 10 to 20, of breeders on Genovesa Island and Isla de la Plata. During non-breeding season they will shift to the east and southeast to the continental shelf region off the coast of Peru and Ecuador. Sometimes they are seen in Colombia.

In January 2026, a waved albatross was spotted off the coast of California near Piedras Blancas Light Station, approximately 3,300 miles (5,300 km) from its normal range. There was also a suspected sighting in October 2025 in Northern California. It is unknown why the bird had traveled so far north.

== Behavior ==
=== Feeding ===
The primary food sources of the waved albatross are fish, squid, and crustaceans, as well as smaller birds. But they have also been observed to scavenge for other food sources, including the regurgitated food of other birds. When foraging, the waved albatross finds places in the ocean where prey will be near this surface; this is the most effective way for the albatross to get its food. The waved albatrosses will forage 10 to 100 km (6.2–62.1 mi) away from the place where the chicks are nesting to get food for them.

=== Breeding ===
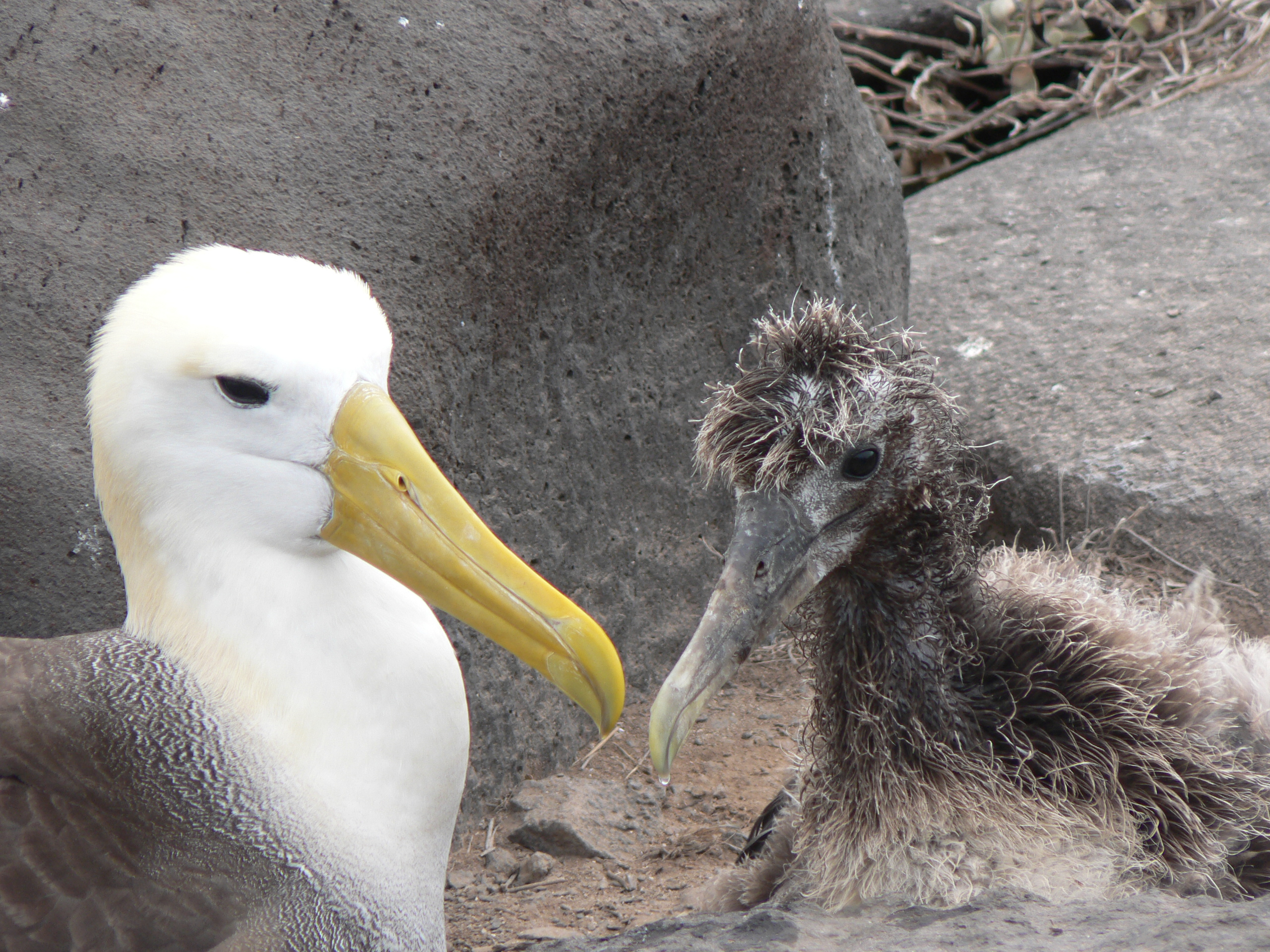
Adult and chick

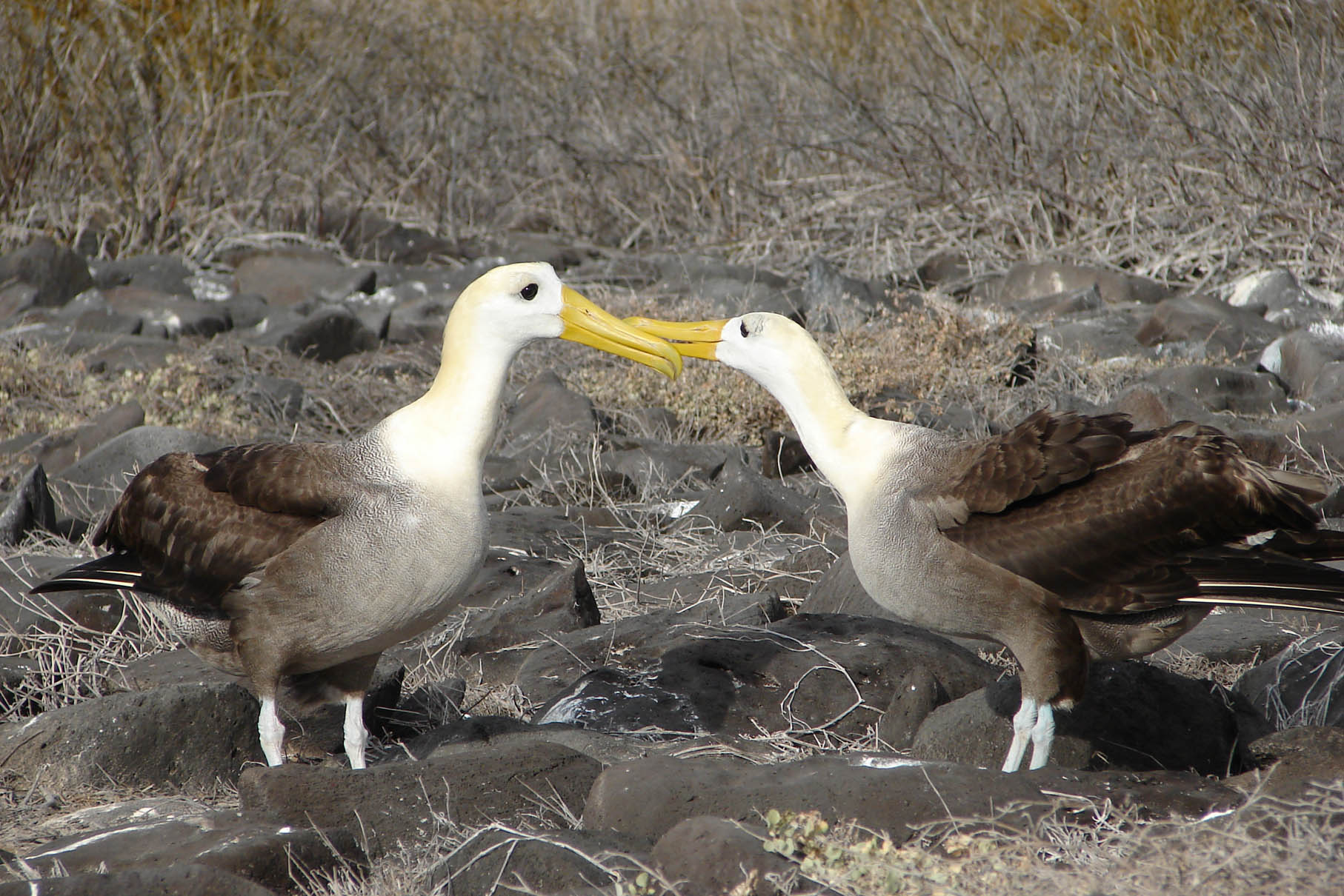
Courtship ritual

Nesting takes place on areas with lava encircled by boulders and sparse vegetation, or thick brush. There is no "nest" created, however, eggs are simply laid in a depression on bare ground. The courtship of the waved albatross is a very elusive and spectacular sight. It includes: rapid bill circling and bowing, beak clacking, and an upraised bill to make a whoo hoo sound. The eggs are laid between April and June and incubated for two months. The clutch is one white egg, measuring 10.6 cm × 6.9 cm (4.2 in × 2.7 in) in length and width, along with a mass of 284 g (10.0 oz). When the eggs hatch, the chicks stay together in small nurseries while the parents go out to the sea for hunting. When the parents return, they may feed the chicks up to 2 kg (4.4 lb) of oil. The young reach adult size by December and leave the colony by January. The partners remain mates until one of the partners dies.

=== Flight ===
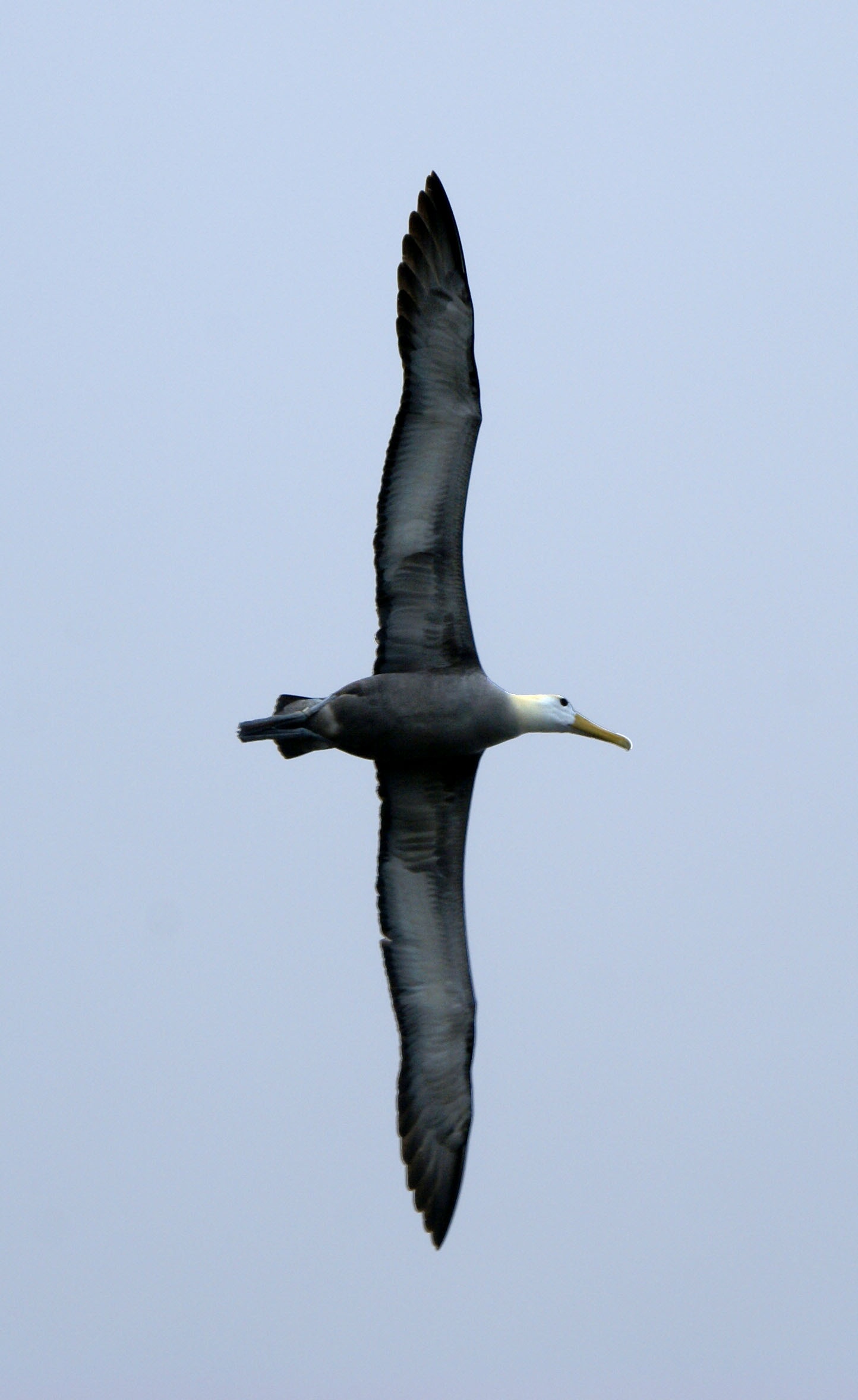
Flying

Waved albatross are spectacular flyers, perhaps even the most famous. They can fly for hours without stalling and they do this by dynamic soaring. The wind speed near the surface of the sea is much lower than about 50 ft (15 m) in the air. The waved albatross uses this to its advantage by gliding at speed into the wind. As the waved albatross glides higher it loses most of its ground speed because it is gliding into a wind of a higher speed. However, its air speed does not fall, enabling it to glide continuously. Waved albatrosses do have difficulty in landing because of their high stalling speed, and in taking off because of their weight and wing span. To make it easier they sometimes take off from cliffs that are somewhat inland rather than beside the coast.

== Conservation ==
Breeding Population and Trends
Breeding Location	Breeding Pair	Trend
Isla de la Plata	20 to 40	unknown
Galapagos Islands	34,660	1–19% decline over 84 years
Total	34,700	1–19% decline over 84 years

The population of waved albatrosses on the Galápagos is protected by national park personnel, and the island is also categorized as a World Heritage Site. But limited range, bycatch by longline fishing, disturbance via tourism, disease, and the effects of illegal fishing in the nearby waters place them in considerable jeopardy. Longline fishing in particular seems to be having a severe impact on the species, the conservation status of which was upgraded from near threatened to vulnerable by the IUCN in 2000.

Despite there still being some 34,700 adult birds in 2001, their numbers have apparently started to decrease at an unknown rate more recently, probably due to longline fishing which also upsets the sex ratio (males being killed more frequently). As the current situation makes the population highly vulnerable to a catastrophic collapse to extinction, it was uplisted to critically endangered status in the 2007 IUCN Red List.

The population of 34,700 adult birds was based on a 2001 estimate; however in 1970 and 1971 there were an estimated 24,000, and 1994 saw between 31,200 and 36,400. This species has an occurrence range of 1,750,000 km^{2} (680,000 sq mi), and a breeding range of 9 km^{2} (3.5 sq mi).

== Gallery ==
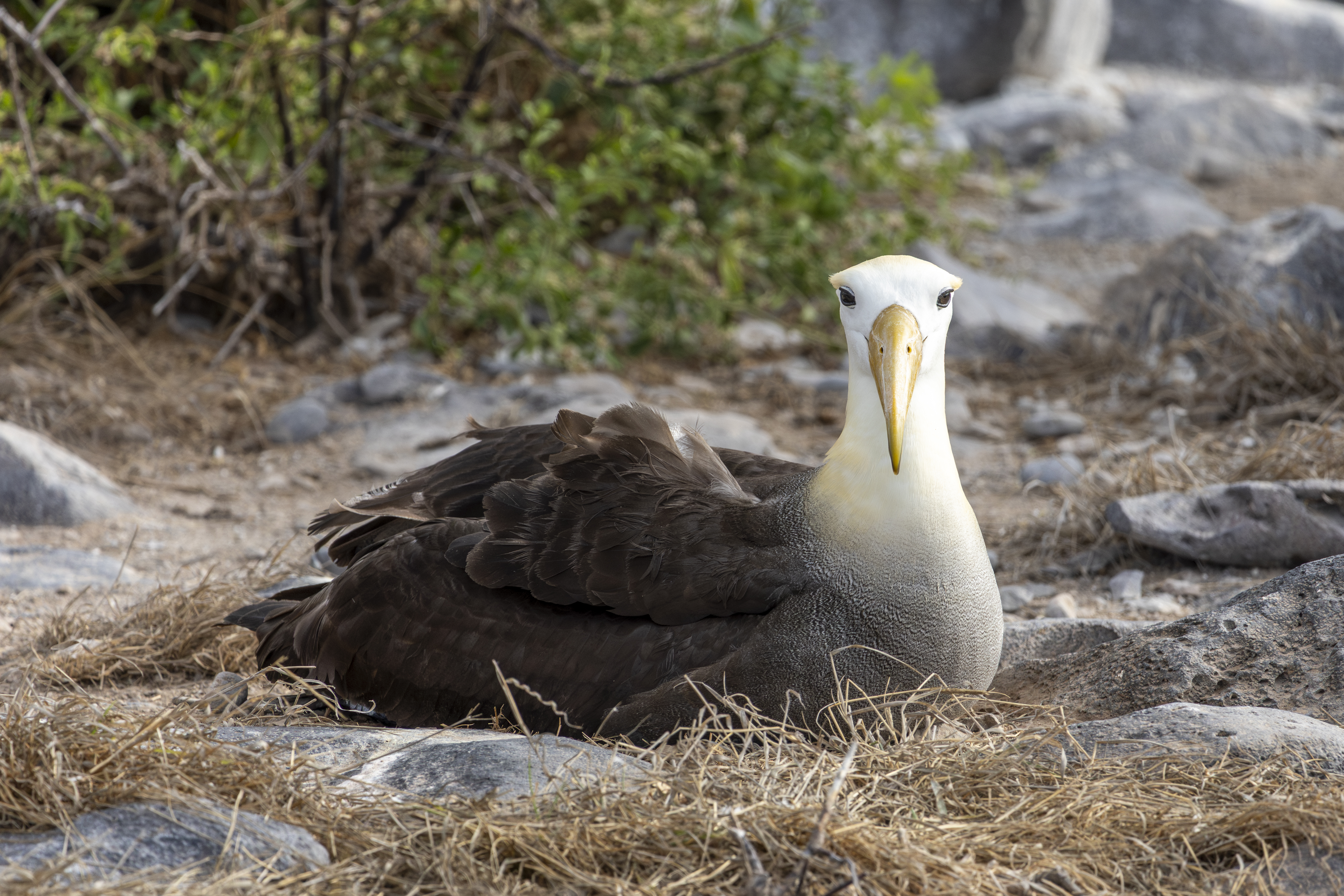
Nesting

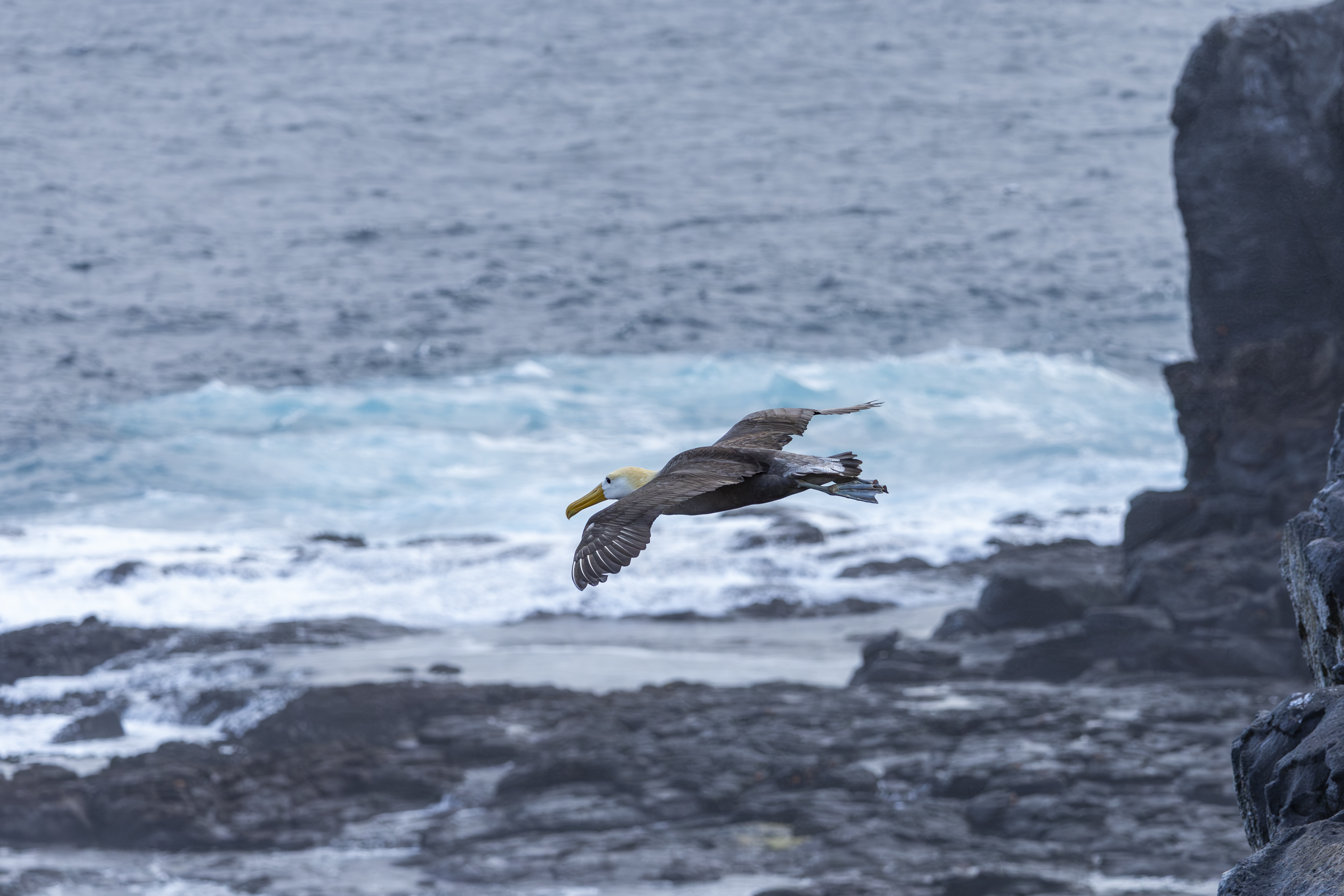
In flight at Española island

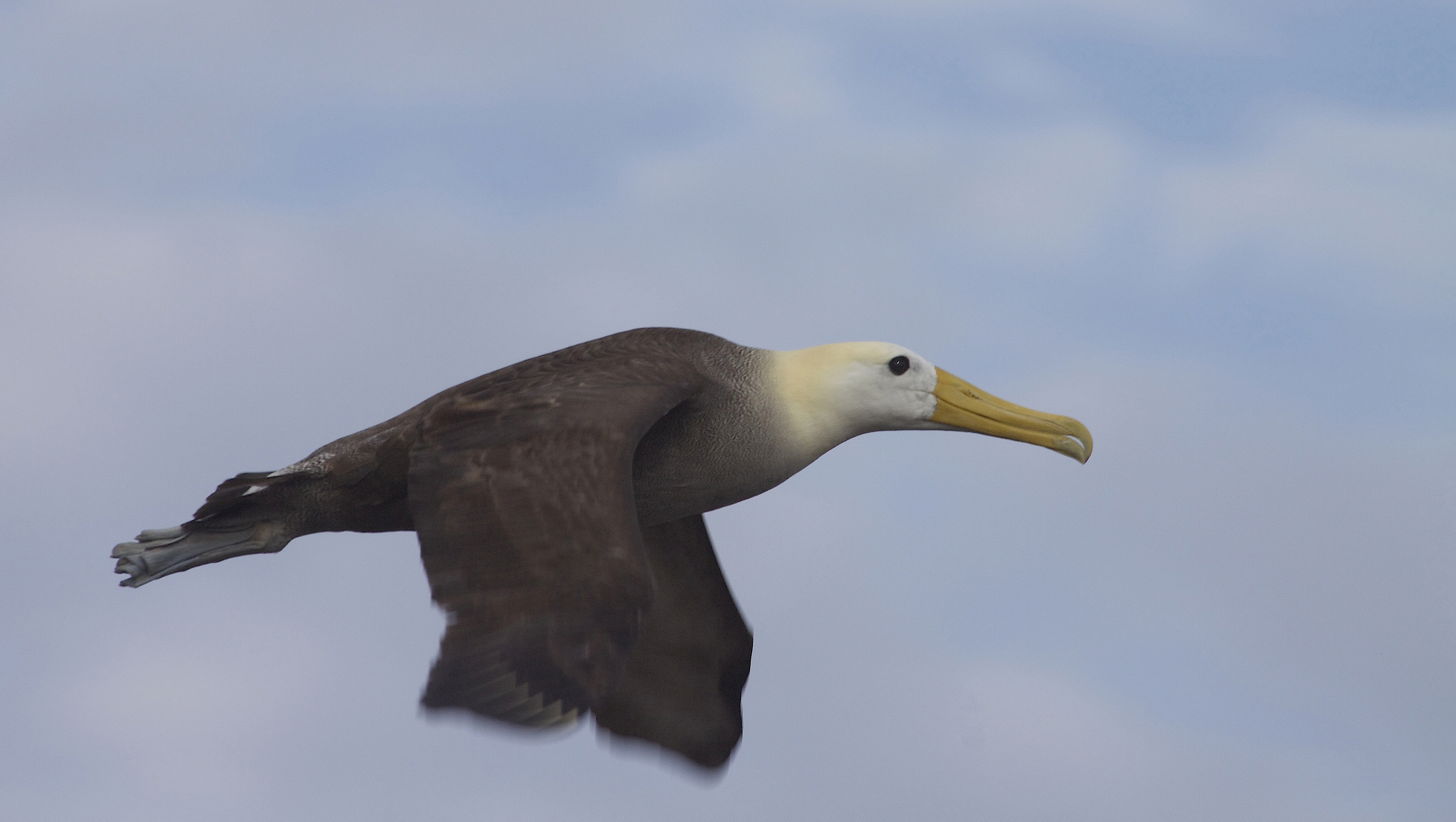
In flight

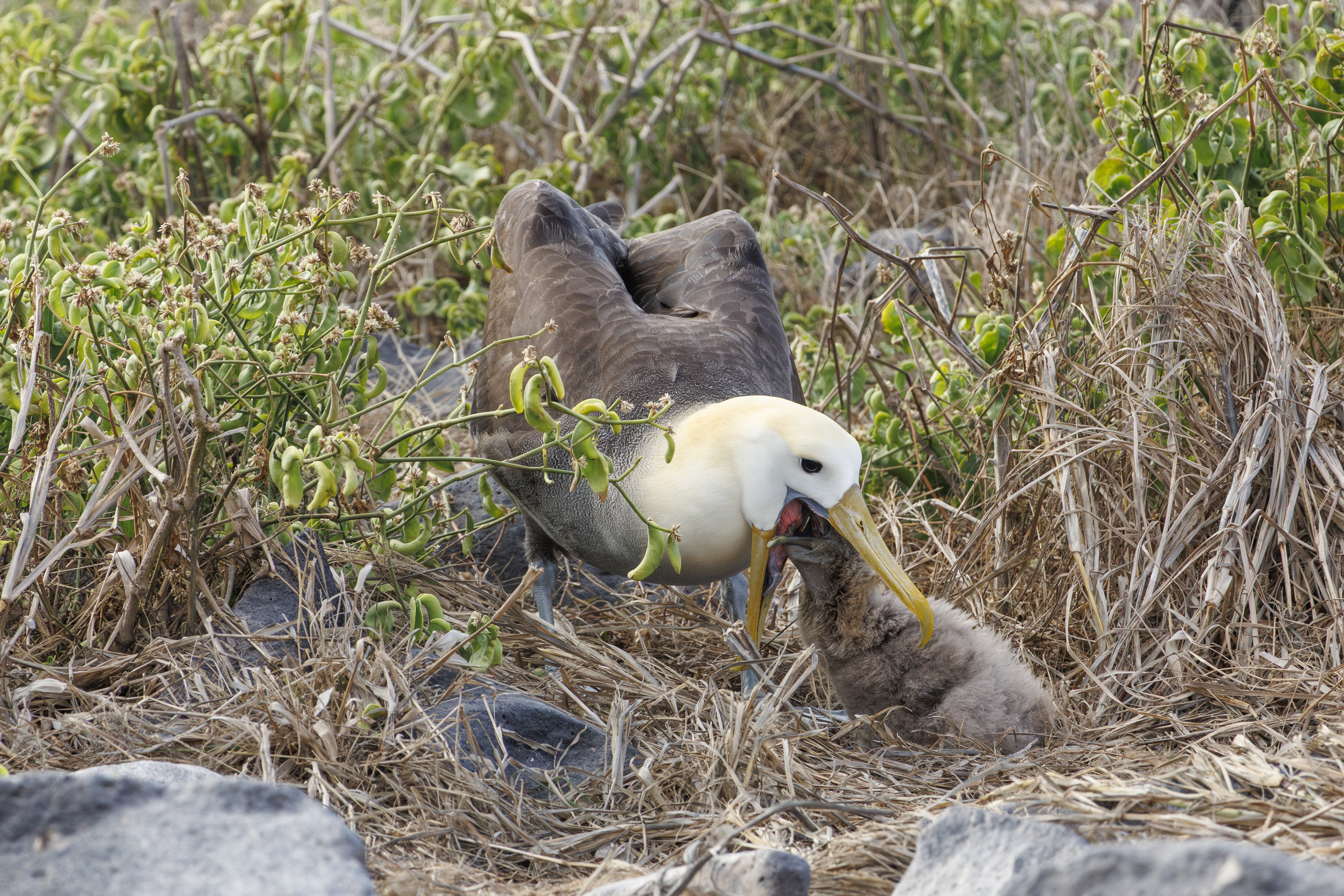
Regurgitating food for a chick

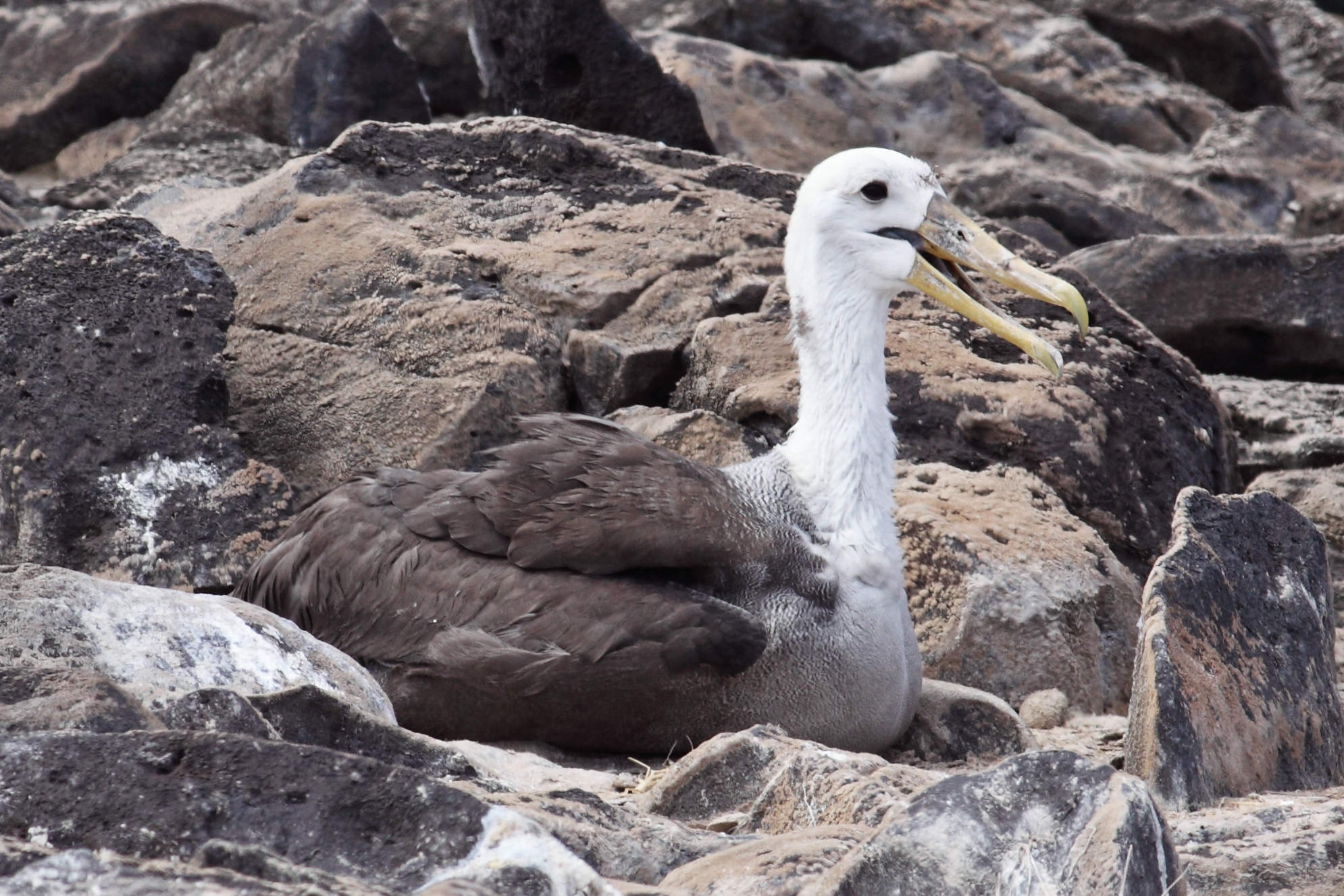
Unfledged chick in January

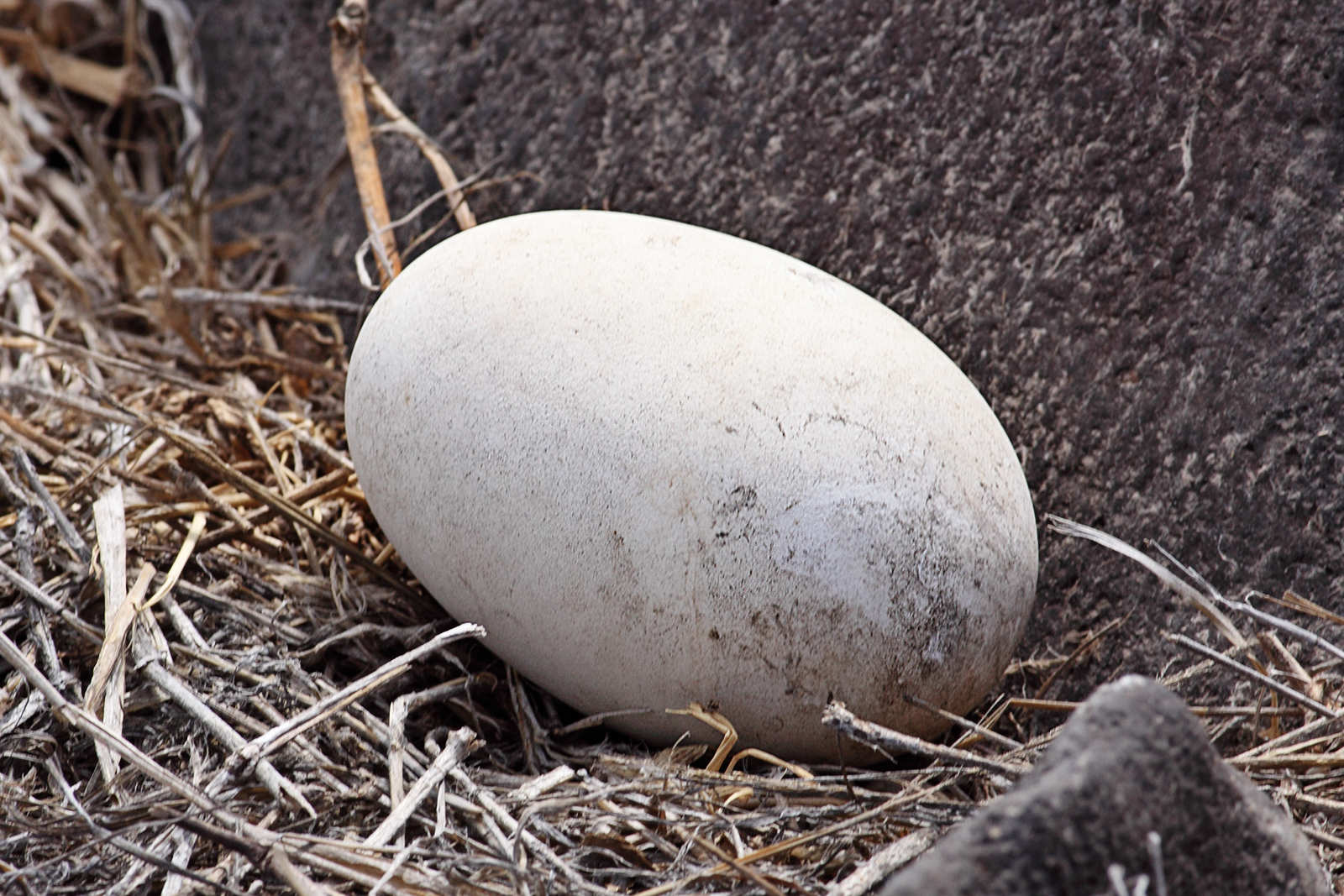
Abandoned egg

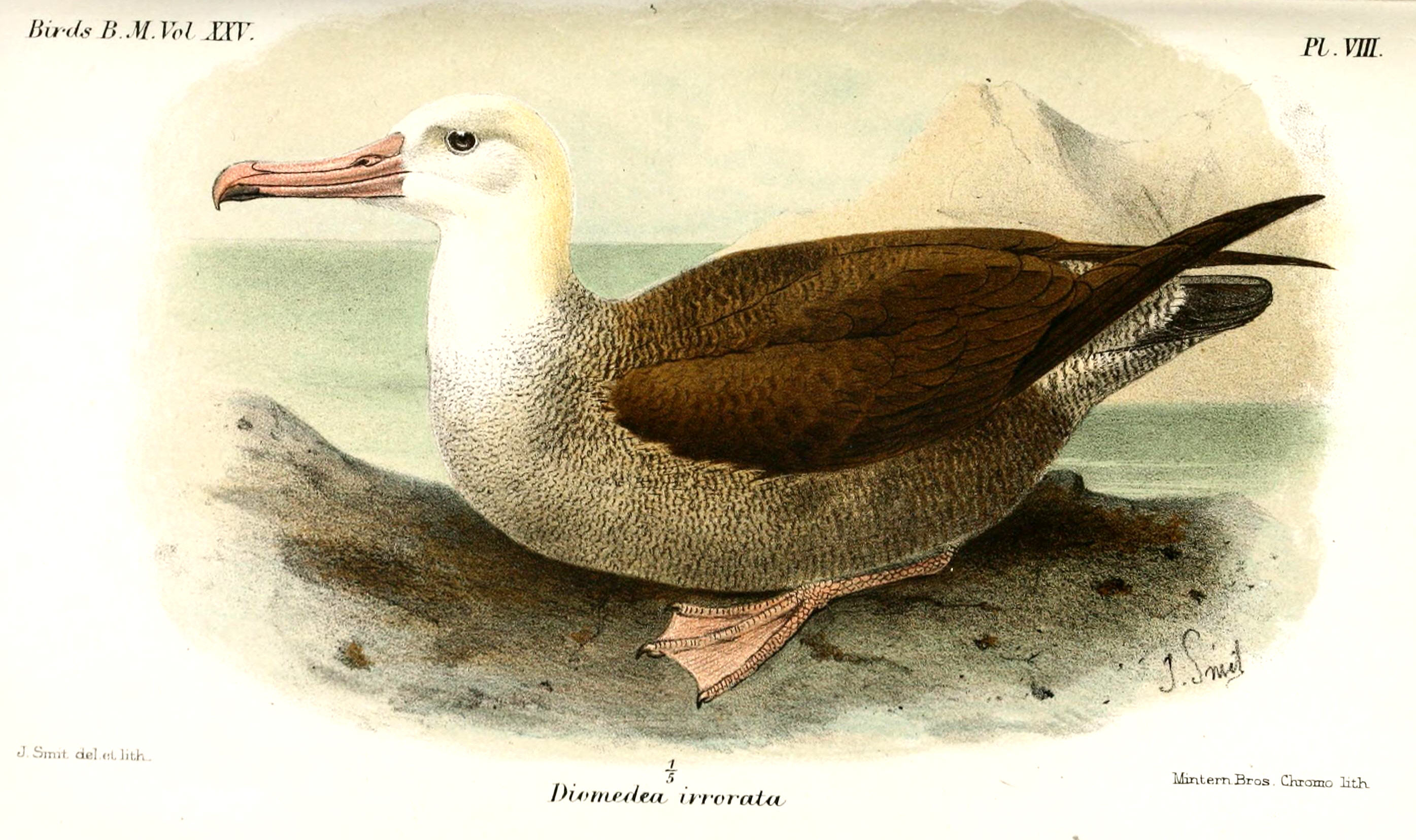
Illustration by Joseph Smit, 1896
