= List of islands of Hawaii =

Islands of the state of Hawaii
Native name: Mokupuni o Hawaiʻi
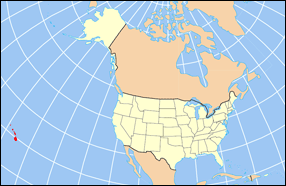
- Location of Hawaii within the United States

Geography
- Location: North Pacific
- Archipelago: Hawaiian Islands
- Total islands: Approximately 132 islands (including 4 of the Midway Atoll)
- Major islands: Hawaiʻi, Maui, Kahoʻolawe. Lānaʻi, Molokaʻi, Oʻahu, Kauaʻi, Niʻihau
- Area: 6,422.6 sq mi (16,634 km^{2})
- Length: 1,500 mi (2400 km)
- Width: 4.306 mi (6.93 km)
- Coastline: 750 mi (1210 km)
- Highest point: 13,803 ft (4,207 m) (Mauna Kea)

Administration
- United States
- State: Hawaii (excluding the federally governed Midway Atoll)

Demographics
- Population: 1,455,271 (2020)

The state of Hawaii, comprising all of the Hawaiian Islands apart from Midway Atoll, has the fourth-longest ocean coastline of the 50 states (after Alaska, Florida, and California) at 750 miles (1,210 km). It is the only state that consists entirely of islands, with 6,422.6 mi^{2} (16,634 km^{2}) of land. The Hawaiian Island archipelago extends some 1,500 miles (2,400 km) from the southernmost island of Hawaiʻi to the northernmost Kure Atoll. Despite being within the boundaries of Hawaii, Midway Atoll, comprising several smaller islands, is not included as an island of Hawaii, because it is classified as a United States Minor Outlying Islands and is therefore administered by the federal government and not the state. The Palmyra Atoll, historically claimed by both Hawaii and the United States is not included because it was separated from Hawaii when it became a state in 1959 and is part of the United States Minor Outlying Islands. The Johnston Atoll which is not included in this list was claimed by both the United States and the Hawaiian Kingdom in 1858 but the Hawaiian Claim was revoked by King Kamehameha the IV later that year upon his learning of the US claim to the island and is now part of the United States Minor Outlying Islands.

Hawaii is divided into five counties: Hawaiʻi, Honolulu, Kalawao, Kauaʻi, and Maui. Each island is included in the boundaries and under the administration of one of these counties. Honolulu County, despite being centralized, administers the outlying Northwestern Hawaiian Islands. Kalawao (the smallest county in the United States in terms of land area) and Maui, both occupying the island of Molokaʻi, are the only counties that share an island. Hawaii is typically recognized by its eight main islands of which seven are inhabited. The main eight islands of Hawaii are:

Main islands
Island	Area (km²)	Area (mi²)	Population
Hawaiʻi	10,430	4,028	201,513
Kahoʻolawe	116.47	45	0
Kauaʻi	1,456.4	562.3	58,303
Lānaʻi	364	140.5	3,193
Maui	1,883	727.2	117,644
Molokaʻi	673.4	260	7,404
Niʻihau	180	69.5	160
Oʻahu	1,545	596.7	876,156

The state of Hawaii officially recognizes only 137 islands in the state which includes four islands of the Midway Atoll. An island in this sense may also include much smaller and typically uninhabited islets, rocks, coral reefs, and atolls. For that reason, this article lists 152 separate islands (but also names smaller island chains such as the French Frigate Shoals, which includes 13 islands of its own). Some of these are too small to appear on maps, and others, such as Maro Reef, only appear above the water's surface during times of low tide. Others, such as the islands Shark and Skate, have completely eroded away.

The majority of the Hawaiian Islands are uninhabited, with Niʻihau being the westernmost island with a population of around 130 natives, no one else is allowed on the island. All the islands west of Niʻihau—those categorized as the Northwestern Hawaiian Islands—are unpopulated and recently incorporated into the Papahānaumokuākea Marine National Monument. The island of Oʻahu has just over one million residents (about 70% of the state's population), and the island of Hawaiʻi is by far the largest island with an area of 10,430 km^{2} (4,030 mi^{2})—62.7% of the state's land area. The islands were first settled as early as AD 300 by Polynesian long-distance navigators. British captain James Cook was the first European to land on the islands in January 1778. The islands, which were governed independently up until 1898 were then annexed by the United States as a territory from 1898 to 1959. On August 21, 1959, they were collectively admitted as the 50th state.

The islands are the exposed peaks of a great undersea mountain range known as the Hawaiian–Emperor seamount chain, formed by volcanic activity over a hotspot in the Earth's mantle. The archipelago formed as the Pacific plate moved slowly northwestward over a hotspot in the mantle at about 51 kilometres (32 mi) per million years. The islands in the northwest of the archipelago are older and typically smaller, due to longer exposure to erosion. The age of the archipelago has been estimated using potassium-argon dating methods. It is estimated that the northwesternmost Kure Atoll is the oldest at approximately 28 million years, while the southeasternmost Hawaiʻi Island is approximately 400,000 years old and still subjected to ongoing volcanism—one of the most active hotspots on Earth.

Note that there are typos in the sources for the smaller islands, such as 'Mokuʻlai', which is not a possible Hawaiian name. The ʻokina and macrons for long vowels are mostly missing from the lists below.

== Hawaiʻi County ==
Hawaiʻi County

Hawaiʻi County centers on Hawaiʻi Island. With an area of 4,028 mi^{2} (10,430 km^{2}), it is larger than all of the other islands of Hawaii combined, encompassing approximately 62.7% of the entire state's land area. It is also the largest island in the United States. In modern times, Hawaiʻi is known commonly as the "Big Island" to reduce confusion between the island and the state itself. The island also contains the state's highest peak: Mauna Kea at 13,803 feet (4,207 m). Hawaiʻi County as a whole has 27 islands and a total population of 185,079.

Island	Coordinates
Arched Rock	19.23444°N 155.90090°W
Coconut Island (Moku Ola)	19.73250°N 155.07139°W
Hawaiʻi	19.50056°N 155.50056°W
Kalaemamo	19.48005°N 155.93738°W
Kaluahee Rock	19.29222°N 155.89130°W
Kaopapa	19.46833°N 155.92500°W
Kauhuula	19.18083°N 155.42417°W
Kaulaʻināiwi Island	19.73500°N 155.07250°W
Kawelohea	19.08583°N 155.55361°W
Keaoi Island	19.27083°N 155.25667°W
Kipu Rock	19.44667°N 155.92333°W
Kuhulu Rock	19.29000°N 155.89250°W
Laahana	19.19333°N 155.39944°W
Lepeamoa Rock	19.33944°N 155.88806°W
Mahikea Island	19.73778°N 155.03167°W
Mokuhonu	18.94694°N 155.69778°W
Mokuokahaʻilani Rock	19.18250°N 155.43667°W
Mokupuku	20.19528°N 155.70250°W
ʻOpihi Rock	19.58250°N 154.91472°W
Paʻakea	18.96944°N 155.61444°W
Paokalani Island	20.19500°N 155.70528°W
Pōhakulua	19.91667°N 155.89750°W
Pulehua Island	18.96667°N 155.62306°W
Reeds Island	19.72722°N 155.09806°W
Wahinemakanui	19.66528°N 154.97917°W

== Honolulu County ==
Honolulu County

Known officially as the City and County of Honolulu, the county includes both the urban district of Honolulu (the state's largest city and capital) and the rest of the island of Oʻahu, as well as several minor surrounding islands. The county also administers the Northwestern Hawaiian Islands with the exception of the federally governed Midway Atoll. The county's population in 2010 was 953,207, making it the 43rd most populated county in the United States. At 596.7 mi^{2} (1,545 km^{2}), the island of Oʻahu is the third largest island and also the most populated, accounting for approximately 70% of the entire state's population. The county as a whole has 63 islands, and 32 of those belong to the Northwestern Hawaiian Islands.

Island	Coordinates
Coconut Island (Moku o Loʻe)	21.43361°N 157.78833°W
Ford Island	21.36667°N 157.96472°W
Kāohikaipu Island	21.32361°N 157.65917°W
Kīhewamoku [sic]	21.67556°N 157.92667°W
Kūkaimanini Island	21.69639°N 158.02389°W
Kahakaʻaulana Island	21.31306°N 157.89806°W
Kapapa Island	21.48000°N 157.80139°W
Kekepa Island	21.46500°N 157.77806°W
Kukuihoʻolua	21.65333°N 157.91611°W
Laulaunui Island	21.36694°N 158.01583°W
Mānana Island	21.33167°N 157.65972°W
Mokauea Island	21.31139°N 157.89500°W
Mōkōlea Rock	21.43500°N 157.72222°W
Mokoliʻi (Chinaman's Hat)	21.51278°N 157.83250°W
Mokuālai [sic]	21.65194°N 157.91194°W
Mokuʻauia (Goat Island)	21.66583°N 157.92556°W
Moku Moʻo	21.39250°N 157.80750°W
Moku Iki (Mokulua Islands)	21.37111°N 157.95028°W
Mokulua Islands	21.39500°N 157.70111°W
Moku Manu	21.47306°N 157.72306°W
Mokumanu Islands	21.46667°N 157.71667°W
Moku Nui (Mokulua Islands)	21.37111°N 157.95222°W
Mokuʻōeo Island	21.31222°N 157.90528°W
Oʻahu	21.43333°N 157.96667°W
Papaʻamoi Island	21.70528°N 158.01250°W
Pōhaku Kulaʻilaʻi	21.53000°N 158.23278°W
Popoiʻa Island	21.40306°N 157.72333°W
Pulemoku	21.66278°N 157.91806°W
Sand Island	21.30833°N 157.88333°W
Wānanapaoa Islands	21.64194°N 158.07250°W

=== Northwestern Hawaii Islands ===
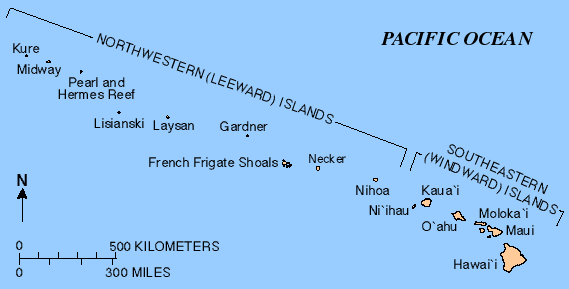
Northwestern Hawaiian Islands

The Northwestern Hawaiian Islands (also known as the Leeward Islands) are the small islands and atolls in the Hawaiian island chain located northwest of the larger islands of Kauaʻi and Niʻihau. For administrative purposes, all of these islands are controlled by Honolulu County. The Northwestern Hawaiian Islands consist of nine main islands and innumerable islets, coral reefs, atolls, sandbar, and intermittent islands—some of which are officially named. All of these islands account for only 3.1075 mi^{2} (8.048 km^{2}) and have no permanent residents.

Midway Atoll, sometimes referred to as Midway Island, is a 2.4 mi^{2} (6.2 km^{2}) archipelago. For quite some time, it had a permanent population of naval personnel. It is one of the northwesternmost islands, located 161 miles (259 km) east of the International Date Line. Kure Atoll is the only island west at 55 miles (89 km) beyond Midway Atoll. It also observes a different time zone (Samoa Time Zone) than the rest of the Hawaiian Islands. Because of its strong military history, Midway Atoll is classified as a Minor Outlying Island, an unorganized territory of the United States and is therefore not under the jurisdiction of Hawaii. Midway Atoll consists of four individual islands.

Indicates an island that is part of the Midway Atoll

Island	Coordinates
Bare Island	23.74809°N 166.14808°W
Bird Island	27.78444°N 175.83611°W
Disappearing Island	23.71601°N 166.13602°W
Eastern Island	28.20985°N 177.32933°W
East Island	23.74675°N 166.14954°W
French Frigate Shoals	23.74889°N 166.14611°W
Gardner Pinnacles	25.00028°N 167.91667°W
Gin Island	23.73693°N 166.13967°W
Grass Island	27.76528°N 175.90056°W
Green Island	28.39444°N 178.29750°W
Hermes Atoll	27.83333°N 175.83333°W
Kittery Island	27.75778°N 175.94028°W
Kure Atoll	28.41667°N 178.33333°W
Laysan Island	25.77083°N 171.73750°W
La Perouse Pinnacle	23.74714°N 166.15881°W
Lisianski Island	26.03333°N 174.00028°W
Little Gin Island	23.73489°N 166.13821°W
Little North Island	27.90278°N 175.73778°W
Maro Reef	25.41500°N 170.59000°W
Midway Atoll	28.23660°N 177.37092°W
Mullet Island	23.75987°N 166.15563°W
Necker Island	23.58333°N 164.70000°W
Nīhoa	23.10000°N 161.96667°W
North Island	27.91667°N 175.73333°W
Pearl Atoll	27.83333°N 175.83333°W
Round Island	23.75953°N 166.15714°W
Sand Island^{1}	28.20955°N 177.37851°W
Sand Island^{2}	27.78583°N 175.86111°W
Seal Island	27.75250°N 175.93472°W
Shark Island	23.76042°N 166.16679°W
Skate Island	23.76535°N 166.15765°W
Spit Island	28.20637°N 177.34967°W
Southeast Island	27.78083°N 175.81167°W
Tern Island	23.76238°N 166.16516°W
Trig Island	23.76456°N 166.16126°W
Whale Island	23.76589°N 166.15773°W
Shallow Island	n/a
Near Island	n/a
Ocean Island	n/a

== Kalawao County ==
Kalawao County

Kalawao County contains no individual islands of its own. With a census population of 90, the county is the country's smallest county in terms of population with 44 fewer residents than Loving County, Texas. At 13.21 mi^{2} (34.2 km^{2}), it is the smallest county by land area in the United States and is often omitted from maps. Kalawao County shares the island of Molokaʻi with Maui County and occupies only 5% of the island's 260 mi^{2} (670 km^{2}) and 1.2% of the island's 7,404 residents.

Island	Coordinates
Molokaʻi	21.19694°N 156.96722°W
Mōkapu	21.18667°N 156.92694°W
Huelo	21.17417°N 156.91917°W
ʻOkala Island	21.17778°N 156.93194°W

== Kauaʻi County ==
Kauaʻi County

Kauaʻi County is the northwesternmost county (excluding the Northwestern Hawaiian Islands) in the state. It occupies the two main islands of Kauaʻi and Niʻihau. Kauai is fourth largest island in the Hawaiian archipelago at 562.3 mi^{2} (1,456 km^{2}). With a population of 58,303 (2000), it holds 99.7% of the county's population of 58,463. The remaining 160 residents reside on Niʻihau. Lehua and Kaʻula are the third and fourth largest islands, although they are very small and uninhabited. Kaʻula is the westernmost of the Hawaiian Islands not included in the Northwestern Hawaiian Island chain. The county as a whole has eight islands.

Island	Coordinates
Kaʻula	21.66111°N 160.54167°W
Kalanipuao Rock	21.88194°N 159.52583°W
Kauaʻi	21.94361°N 159.49389°W
Kuakamoku Rock	21.89333°N 160.21972°W
Lehua	22.01944°N 160.10056°W
Mokuʻaeʻae	22.23778°N 159.40556°W
Niʻihau	21.90667°N 160.14917°W
Puʻukole	22.00750°N 160.09694°W

== Maui County ==
Maui County

Maui County consists of four of the state's main islands: Maui, Kahoʻolawe, Lānaʻi, and Molokaʻi. With a land area of 1,159.20 mi^{2} (3,002.3 km^{2}), it had a population of 154,834 in 2000. The island of Maui has the most residents at 117,644 (76% of the county's population). It is also the largest of the county's islands with 727.2 mi^{2} (1,883 km^{2}) of land—the state's second largest island and the 17th largest in the country. At 44.6 mi^{2} (116 km^{2}), Kahoʻolawe is the state's largest island with no permanent inhabitants. Lānaʻi has a population of 3,193; Molokaʻi has a population of 7,404. Molokaʻi is the only island in Hawaii that is divided between two counties. With a population of 90, Kalawao County occupies a tiny 13.21 mi^{2} (34.2 km^{2}) portion on the northern shore of the island. Maui County contains 59 named islands.

Island	Coordinates
Āhole Rock	20.64972°N 156.0575°W
ʻĀlau Island	20.73139°N 155.98028°W
ʻAʻawaiki	20.96611°N 156.52389°W
ʻAʻawanui	20.96389°N 156.52194°W
Aluea Rocks	20.84944°N 156.12556°W
Haukoʻi	21.16806°N 156.89833°W
Hulu Island	20.96111°N 156.51944°W
Kaelua	20.83083°N 156.09861°W
Kahālau [sic]	20.89861°N 156.19694°W
Kahoʻolawe	20.55000°N 156.60000°W
Kalaepōhaku	20.78222°N 156.46389°W
Kanahā Rock	21.13389°N 156.70778°W
Kāneʻāpua	20.73722°N 156.96889°W
Moku o Kau	20.90778°N 156.21056°W
Kauwalu	20.85917°N 156.13222°W
Keōpuka Rock [sic]	20.87889°N 156.17528°W
Kukuipalaoa	21.17194°N 156.83083°W
Lānaʻi	20.84167°N 156.91778°W
Laupapa Rock	20.69194°N 156.00833°W
Mahinanui	20.99861°N 156.54389°W
Makoloaka Island	20.84139°N 156.12389°W
Maui	20.58194°N 156.37500°W
Mōkeʻehia Island	20.98636°N 156.52586°W
Mōkohalā Island	21.17472°N 156.87944°W
Mōkōlea Rock	21.17861°N 156.88889°W
Mokuʻula	20.87167°N 156.67778°W
Mokuhala	20.86194°N 156.13667°W
Mokuhoʻoniki	21.13583°N 156.70583°W
Mokuhōlua	20.86667°N 156.15389°W
Mokuhuki	20.83083°N 156.11833°W
Mokulau	20.64000°N 156.11333°W
Mokumana	20.86278°N 156.13361°W
Mokumanu	21.17250°N 156.89111°W
Mokupala	20.70750°N 155.99639°W
Mokupapa^{1}	20.65083°N 156.06083°W
Mokupapa^{2}	20.82806°N 156.08278°W
Mokupapapa	21.16250°N 156.73278°W
Mokupipi	20.82778°N 156.08250°W
Molokaʻi	20.73139°N 155.98028°W
Molokini	20.63361°N 156.49722°W
Mokunaio	20.74111°N 156.96944°W
Nāmoku	21.20861°N 156.98806°W
Nānāhoa	20.82861°N 156.99528°W
Pāʻūonuʻakea	21.16667°N 156.90028°W
Pai Island	20.82056°N 156.06917°W
Papaloa	20.75889°N 155.98139°W
Papanuiokāne	20.94861°N 156.28056°W
Pohaku Manamana	20.58333°N 156.34361°W
Pōhakupaea	20.59806°N 156.43583°W
Poʻopoʻo	20.73861°N 156.92361°W
Puʻukiʻi Island	20.76028°N 155.98250°W
Puʻukoaʻe	20.51389°N 156.61333°W
Puʻupehe	20.73750°N 156.89306°W
Twin Rocks	20.76194°N 155.98000°W
Waiʻōpae	20.62778°N 156.21028°W
Waiakapuhi	20.58000°N 156.36694°W

== See also ==
- Lists of islands
