= List of lighthouses in Hawaii =

This is a list of lighthouses in Hawaii. Fifteen lighthouses in Hawaii are associated with the U.S. Coast Guard. Including minor lights, there are 43 lights in total.

== Lighthouses ==
Name	Image	Location	Coordinates	Year first lit	Automated	Year deactivated	Current Lens	Focal Height
Aloha Tower		Honolulu	21°18′25.7″N 157°51′57.7″W	1926	Unknown	1960s	None	184 ft (56 m)
Barbers Point Light		Kapolei	21°17′47.1″N 158°06′22.2″W	1888 (First); 1933 (Current)	1964	Active	DCB-224	85 ft (26 m)
Cape Kumukahi Light		Hilo (Kapoho)	19.516°N 154.811°W	1929 (First); 1934 (Current)	1960	Active	DCB-224	156 ft (48 m)
Diamond Head Light		Honolulu	21°15′20.7″N 157°48′34.5″W	1899 (First); 1917 (Current)	1924	Active	Unknown	147 ft (45 m)
Kauhola Point Light		Halaula (Kauhola Point)	20.2453°N 155.7716°W	1897 (First); 1933 (Last)	1951	2009 (Demolished)	None	116 ft (35 m)
Kilauea Light		Kilauea	22°13′54.1″N 159°24′07.1″W	1913	1974	Active (Inactive: 1976–2013)	Second-order Fresnel	174 ft (53 m)
Lahaina Light		Lahaina	20°52′19.9″N 156°40′43.1″W	1840 (First); 1917 (Current)	Unknown	Active	Unknown	44 ft (13 m)
Makapuu Point Light		Makapuʻu Point	21°18′35.7″N 157°38′59.1″W	1909	1974	Active	Hyperradiant Fresnel	420 ft (130 m)
Moloka'i Light		Molokai	21°12′34.5″N 156°58′10.9″W	1909	1966	Active	VRB-25	213 ft (65 m)
Nawiliwili Light		Nawiliwili Beach	21°57′18.0″N 159°20′08.8″W	1906 (First); 1932 (Current)	1953	Active	Unknown	110 ft (34 m)

== Minor Lights ==
There are over 30 "minor lights" in Hawaii, most if not all of them are on beacons or poles. The "Year built" column only represents the most recent structure, all of the lights listed below are active unless noted otherwise. Complete data for any given light may be unavailable due to poor record keeping, or lack details from reliable sources.

Name	Image	Location	Coordinates	Year built	Focal Height	USCG number	Admiralty number
Coconut Point Light		Coconut Island	19°43′36.9″N 155°05′10.2″W	1975	39 ft (12 m)	28050	G7200
Hanamanioa Point Light		Maui	20°34′59.5″N 156°24′43.3″W	1918	73 ft (22 m)	28405	G7258
Hanapepe Light		Hanapepe	N/A	Unknown	Unknown	N/A	N/A
Hawea Point Light		Kapalua	N/A	Unknown	Unknown	N/A	N/A
Hilo Range Front Light		Hilo	19°44′00.8″N 155°04′05.1″W	Unknown	71 ft (22 m)	28060	G7202
Hilo Range Rear Light		Hilo	19°43′55.2″N 155°02′57.5″W	Unknown	127 ft (39 m)	28065	G7202.1
Honolulu Entrance Channel; Range Front Light		Honolulu	21°18′19.2″N 157°51′55.8″W	Unknown	46 ft (14 m)	29185	G7342
Honolulu Entrance Channel; Range Rear Light		Honolulu	21°18′23.5″N 157°51′53.3″W	Unknown	64 ft (20 m)	29190	G7342.1
Honolulu Harbor Entrance Light		Honolulu	21°17′44.7″N 157°52′08.3″W	Unknown	95 ft (29 m)	29170	G7338
Ka Lae Light		Ka Lae	18°54′43.8″N 155°40′54.6″W	1972	60 ft (18 m)	28140	G7242
Kaena Point Light		Kaena Point	21°34′27.5″N 158°16′45.8″W	1990	71 ft (22 m)	29695	G7450.5
Kahala Point Light		Kahala	N/A	Unknown	Unknown	N/A	N/A
Kaho'olawe Southwest Point; Light		Kahoolawe	20°30′08.5″N 156°39′59.0″W	1987	120 ft (37 m)	28515	G7252
Kailua Light		Kailua	19°38′16.2″N 156°00′03.2″W	1915	32 ft (9.8 m)	28185	G7234
Kalihi Channel Range; Front Light		Kalihi	21°18′32.6″N 157°53′42.9″W	Unknown	36 ft (11 m)	29245	G7363
Kalihi Channel Range; Rear Light		Kalihi	21°18′52.6″N 157°53′40.3″W	Unknown	67 ft (20 m)	29250	G7363.1
Kauiki Head Light		Hana	20°45′25.7″N 155°58′46.4″W	1914	85 ft (26 m)	28390	G7288
Kaumalapau Light		Lanai	20°46′59.1″N 156°59′29.5″W	Unknown	68 ft (21 m)	28555	G7318
Kaunakakai Range Front Light		Kaunakakai	21°05′15.9″N 157°01′29.2″W	1912	30 ft (9.1 m)	28605	G7306
Kaunakakai Range Rear Light		Kaunakakai	21°05′20.8″N 157°01′25.7″W	1912	43 ft (13 m)	28610	G7306.1
Kawaihae Light		Kawaihae	20°02′29.3″N 155°49′58.2″W	1915	59 ft (18 m)	28270	G7228
Keahole Point Light		Keahole Point	19°43′40.4″N 156°03′40.0″W	2008	43 ft (13 m)	28215	G7231
Kokole Light		Poipu	N/A	Unknown	58 ft (18 m)	N/A	N/A
Kuki'i Point Light		Lihue	21°57′24.0″N 159°20′52.6″W	Unknown	47 ft (14 m)	29755	G7482
Kukuihaele Point Light		Kukuihaele	20°07′40.8″N 155°33′21.6″W	1937	154 ft (47 m)	28015	G7218
Lā'au Point Light		Molokai	21°05′59.1″N 157°18′18.6″W	1912	151 ft (46 m)	28670	G7296
Laupāhoehoe Point Light		Laupāhoehoe	19°59′37.4″N 155°14′26.0″W	1975	39 ft (12 m)	28020	G7214
Lehua Rock Light		Lehua	22°01′08.4″N 160°05′53.9″W	Unknown	704 ft (215 m)	29935	G7540
Mahukona Light		Mahukona	20°10′49.3″N 155°54′05.4″W	1915	64 ft (20 m)	28325	G7226
Makahu'ena Point Light		Koloa	21°52′07.9″N 159°26′39.0″W	1983	80 ft (24 m)	29850	G7520
Manele Bay Light		Lanai City	N/A	Unknown	Unknown	N/A	N/A
McGregor Point Light		Maalaea	20°46′39.0″N 156°31′22.5″W	1915	72 ft (22 m)	28415	G7260
Milolii Point Light		Milolii	19°11′13.3″N 155°54′28.8″W	1965	44 ft (13 m)	28145	G7240
Molokini Light		Molokini	20°37′50.2″N 156°29′51.0″W	1989	186 ft (57 m)	28410	G7254
Nakalele Point Light		Nakalele Point	21°01′44.8″N 156°35′25.6″W	1910	142 ft (43 m)	28330	G7270
Napoopoo Light		Captain Cook	19°28′45.1″N 155°56′11.5″W	1922	27 ft (8.2 m)	28150	G7236
Nohili Point Light		Poipu	N/A	Unknown	120 ft (37 m)	N/A	N/A
Palaoa Point Light		Lanai	20°43′56.5″N 156°57′53.6″W	1934	91 ft (28 m)	28554	G7314
Paukaa Point Light		Paukaa	19°45′44.0″N 155°05′23.1″W	1925	145 ft (44 m)	28030	G7210
Pauwela Point Light		Pauwela	20°56′44.0″N 156°19′16.8″W	1960s	161 ft (49 m)	28385	G7286
Pearl Harbor Entrance; Range Front Light		Pearl Harbor	21°19′36.4″N 157°58′15.8″W	Unknown	60 ft (18 m)	29380	G7370
Pearl Harbor Entrance; Range Rear Light		Pearl Harbor	21°19′56.0″N 157°58′26.1″W	Unknown	95 ft (29 m)	29385	G7370.1
Pepeekeo Point Light		Pepeekeo	19°50′50.1″N 155°04′57.6″W	2004	147 ft (45 m)	28025	G7212
Pohakuloa Point Light		Lanai City	N/A	1968	Unknown	N/A	N/A
Pyramid Rock Light		Kaneohe	21°27′44.2″N 157°45′48.8″W	1941	101 ft (31 m)	28675	G7324

== See also ==
- List of lighthouses in the United States
- Lists of lighthouses and lightvessels
