= Hawaiian Islands =

Archipelago in the Pacific Ocean

Native name: Nā Mokupuni Hawaiʻi
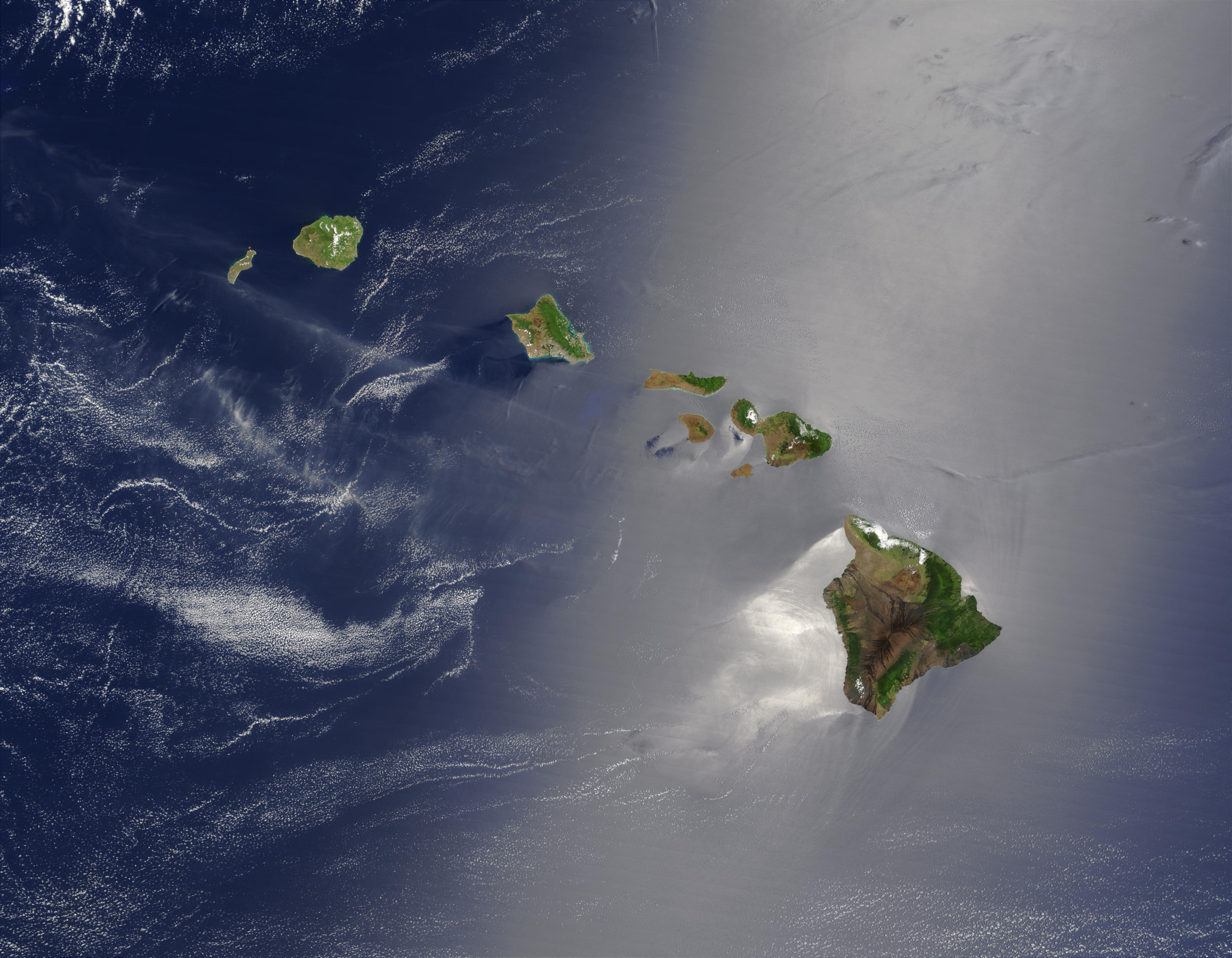
- The Windward Islands of Hawaii

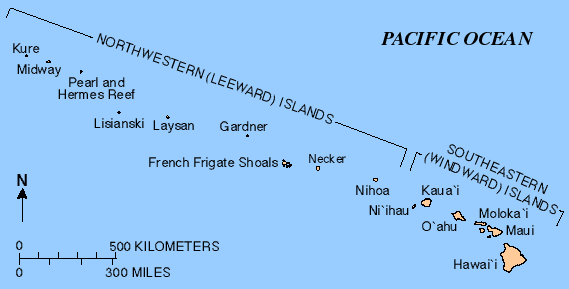

Geography
- Location: North Pacific Ocean
- Coordinates: 20°54′N 156°36′W
- Total islands: 137
- Highest point: Mauna Kea; 13,796 ft (4,205 m)

Administration
- United States
- State: Hawaii
- Unincorporated unorganized territory: Midway Atoll
- Largest settlement: Honolulu

The Hawaiian Islands (Hawaiian: Mokupuni Hawaiʻi) are an archipelago of eight major volcanic islands, several atolls, and numerous smaller islets in the North Pacific Ocean, extending some 1,500 miles (2,400 kilometers) from the island of Hawaiʻi in the south to northernmost Kure Atoll. Formerly called the Sandwich Islands, (Note: The old name came from British naval officer James Cook, who chose it in honor of his sponsor the 4th Earl of Sandwich, the then First Lord of the Admiralty.) the present name for the archipelago is derived from the name of its largest island, Hawaiʻi.

The archipelago sits on the Pacific plate. The islands are exposed peaks of a great undersea mountain range known as the Hawaiian–Emperor seamount chain, formed by volcanic activity over the Hawaiian hotspot. The islands are about 1,860 miles (3,000 km) from the nearest continent and are part of the Polynesia subregion of Oceania.

The U.S. state of Hawaii occupies the archipelago almost in its entirety (including the mostly uninhabited Northwestern Hawaiian Islands), with the sole exception of Midway Atoll (a United States Minor Outlying Island). Hawaii is the only U.S. state that is situated entirely on an archipelago, and the only state not geographically connected with North America. The Northwestern islands (sometimes called the Leeward Islands) and surrounding seas are protected as a national monument and World Heritage Site.

== Islands and reefs ==
The Hawaiian Islands have a total land area of 6,423.4 square miles (16,636.5 km^{2}). Except for Midway, which is an unincorporated unorganized territory of the United States, these islands and islets are administered as Hawaii—the 50th state of the United States.

=== Major islands ===
Island	Nickname	Area	Population (as of 2020)	Density	Highest point	Maximum elevation	Age (Ma)	Location
Hawaiʻi	The Big Island	4,028.0 sq mi (10,432.5 km^{2})	200,629	49.8/sq mi (19.2/km^{2})	Mauna Kea	13,796 ft (4,205 m)	0.4	19°34′N 155°30′W
Maui	The Valley Isle	727.2 sq mi (1,883.4 km^{2})	164,221	225.8/sq mi (87.2/km^{2})	Haleakalā	10,023 ft (3,055 m)	1.3–0.8	20°48′N 156°20′W
Oʻahu	The Gathering Place	596.7 sq mi (1,545.4 km^{2})	1,016,508	1,703.5/sq mi (657.7/km^{2})	Mount Kaʻala	4,003 ft (1,220 m)	3.7–2.6	21°28′N 157°59′W
Kauaʻi	The Garden Isle	552.3 sq mi (1,430.5 km^{2})	73,298	132.7/sq mi (51.2/km^{2})	Kawaikini	5,243 ft (1,598 m)	5.1	22°05′N 159°30′W
Molokaʻi	The Friendly Isle	260.0 sq mi (673.4 km^{2})	7,345	28.3/sq mi (10.9/km^{2})	Kamakou	4,961 ft (1,512 m)	1.9–1.8	21°08′N 157°02′W
Lānaʻi	The Pineapple Isle	140.5 sq mi (363.9 km^{2})	3,367	24.0/sq mi (9.3/km^{2})	Lānaʻihale	3,366 ft (1,026 m)	1.3	20°50′N 156°56′W
Niʻihau	The Forbidden Isle	69.5 sq mi (180.0 km^{2})	84	1.2/sq mi (0.5/km^{2})	Mount Pānīʻau	1,250 ft (381 m)	4.9	21°54′N 160°10′W
Kahoʻolawe	The Target Isle	44.6 sq mi (115.5 km^{2})	0	0/sq mi (0/km^{2})	Puʻuomoaʻula Nui	1,483 ft (452 m)	1.0	20°33′N 156°36′W

The eight major islands of Hawaii (Windward Islands) are listed above. All islands except Kaho'olawe are inhabited.

=== Minor islands, islets ===
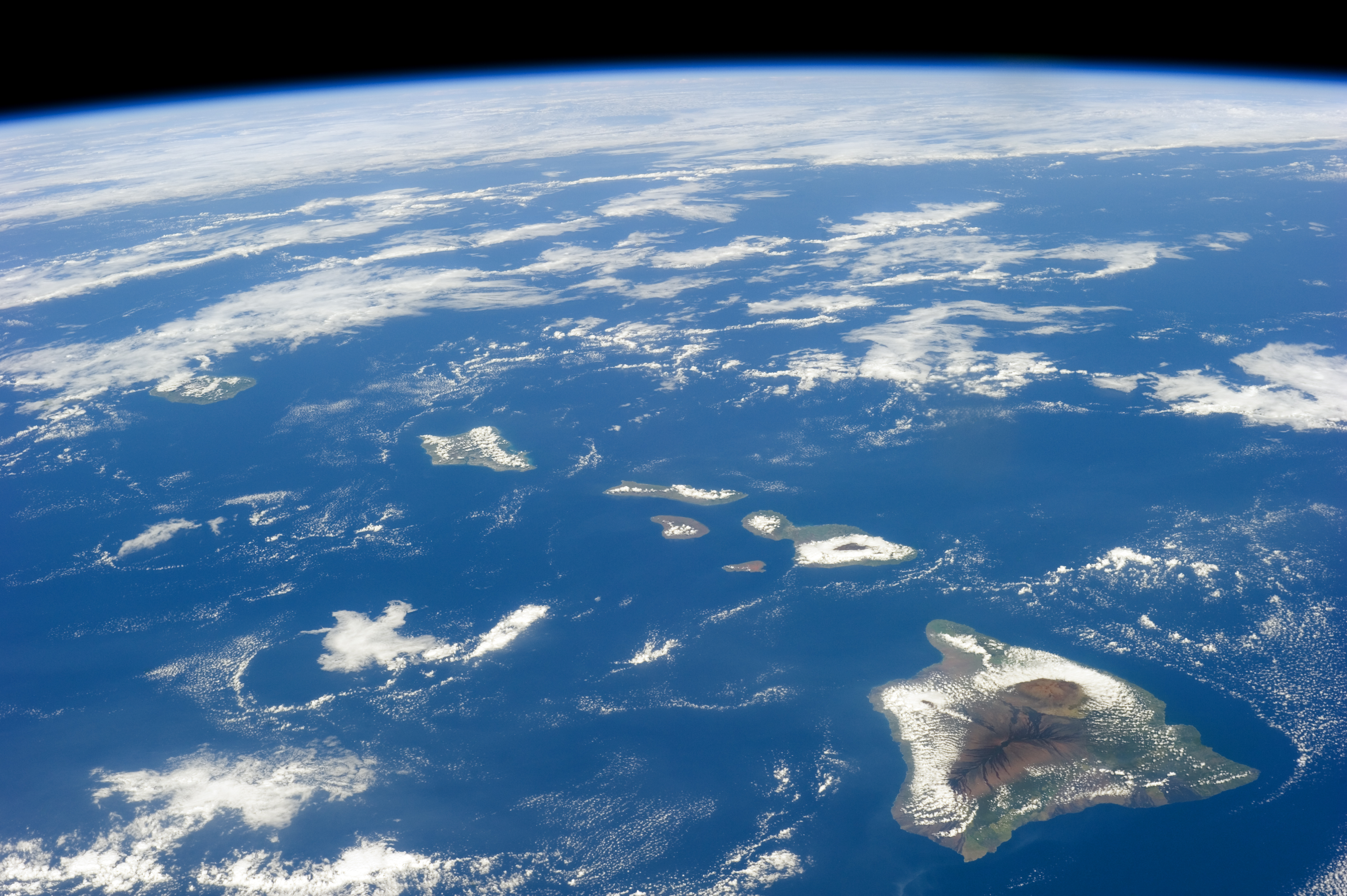
Hawaiian Islands from space.

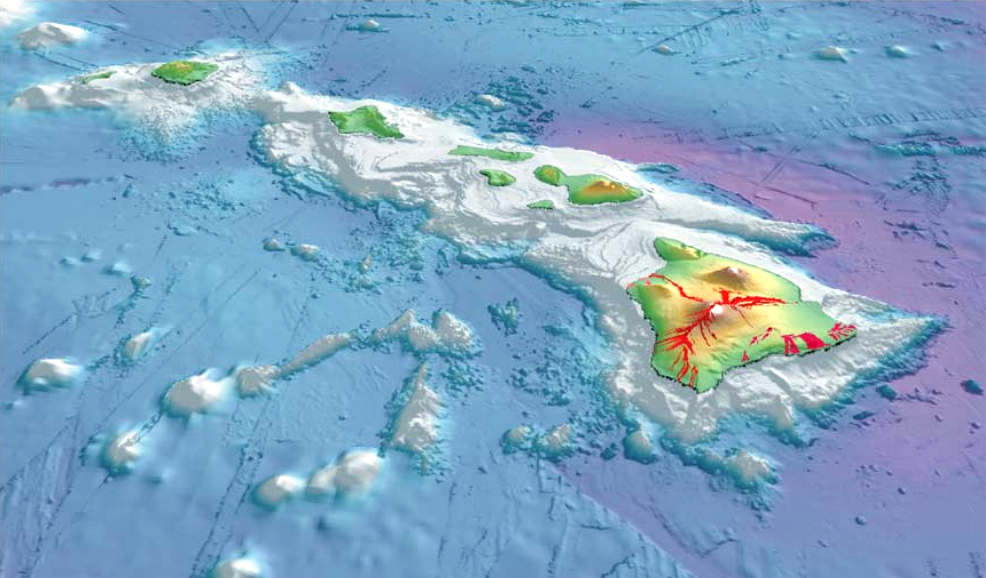
3-D perspective view of the southeastern Hawaiian Islands, with the white summits of Mauna Loa (4,170 m or 13,680 ft high) and Mauna Kea (4,207.3 m or 13,803 ft high). The islands are the tops of massive volcanoes, the bulk of which lie below the sea surface. Ocean depths are colored from violet (5,750 m or 18,860 ft deep northeast of Maui) and indigo to light gray (shallowest). Historical lava flows are shown in red, erupting from the summits and rift zones of Mauna Loa, Kilauea, and Hualalai volcanoes on Hawaiʻi.

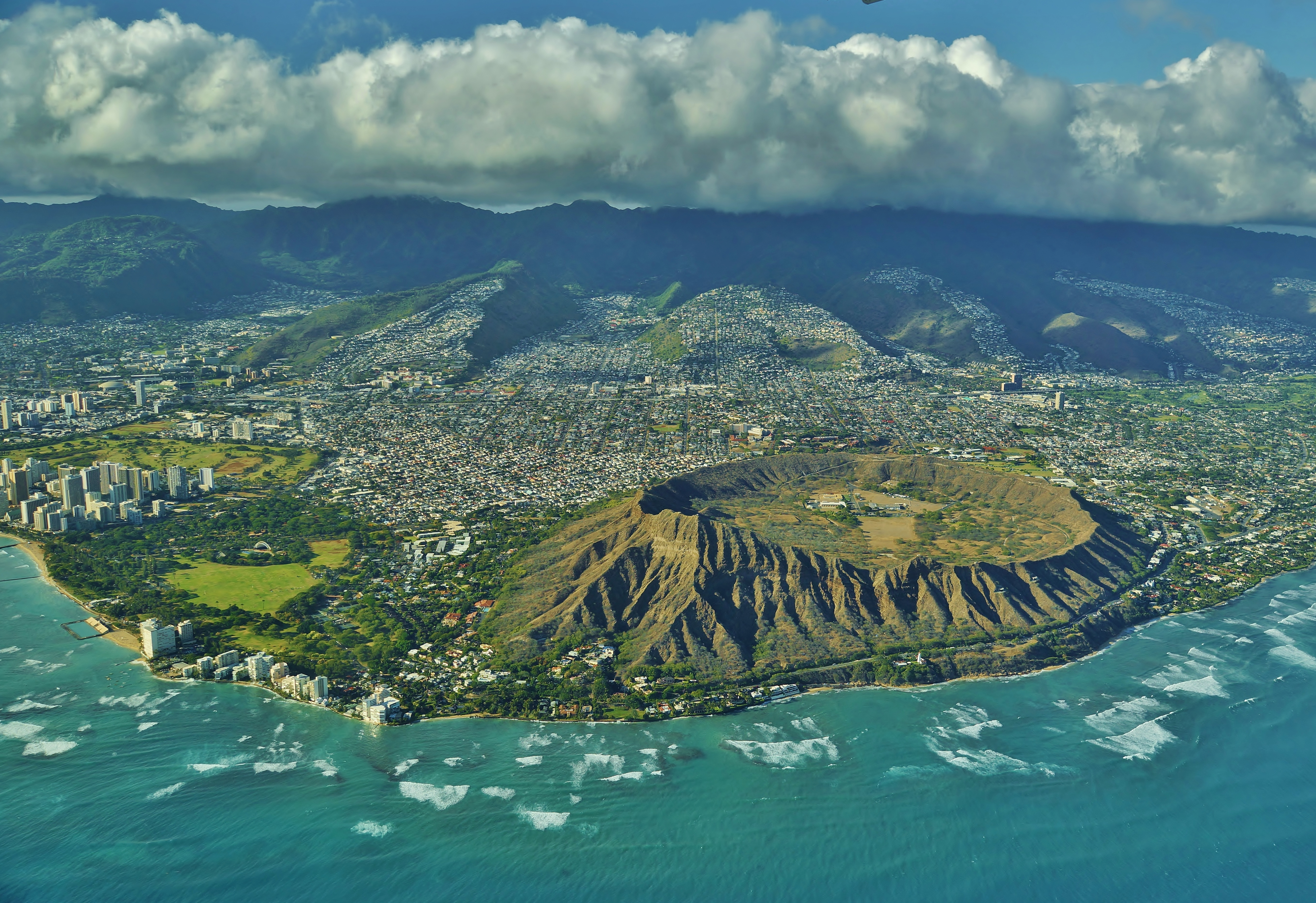
Aerial view of Lēʻahi or Diamond Head, Oʻahu

The state of Hawaii counts 137 "islands" in the Hawaiian Chain. This number includes all minor islands (small islands), islets (even smaller islands) offshore of the major islands (listed above), and individual islets in each atoll. These include:

- Kaʻula
- Kāohikaipu
- Lehua
- Mānana
- Mōkōlea Rock
- Mokoliʻi
- Moku Manu
- Mokuauia
- Moku o Loʻe
- Moku Ola
- Mokuʻumeʻume
- Molokini
- Nā Mokulua

=== Partial islands, atolls, reefs ===
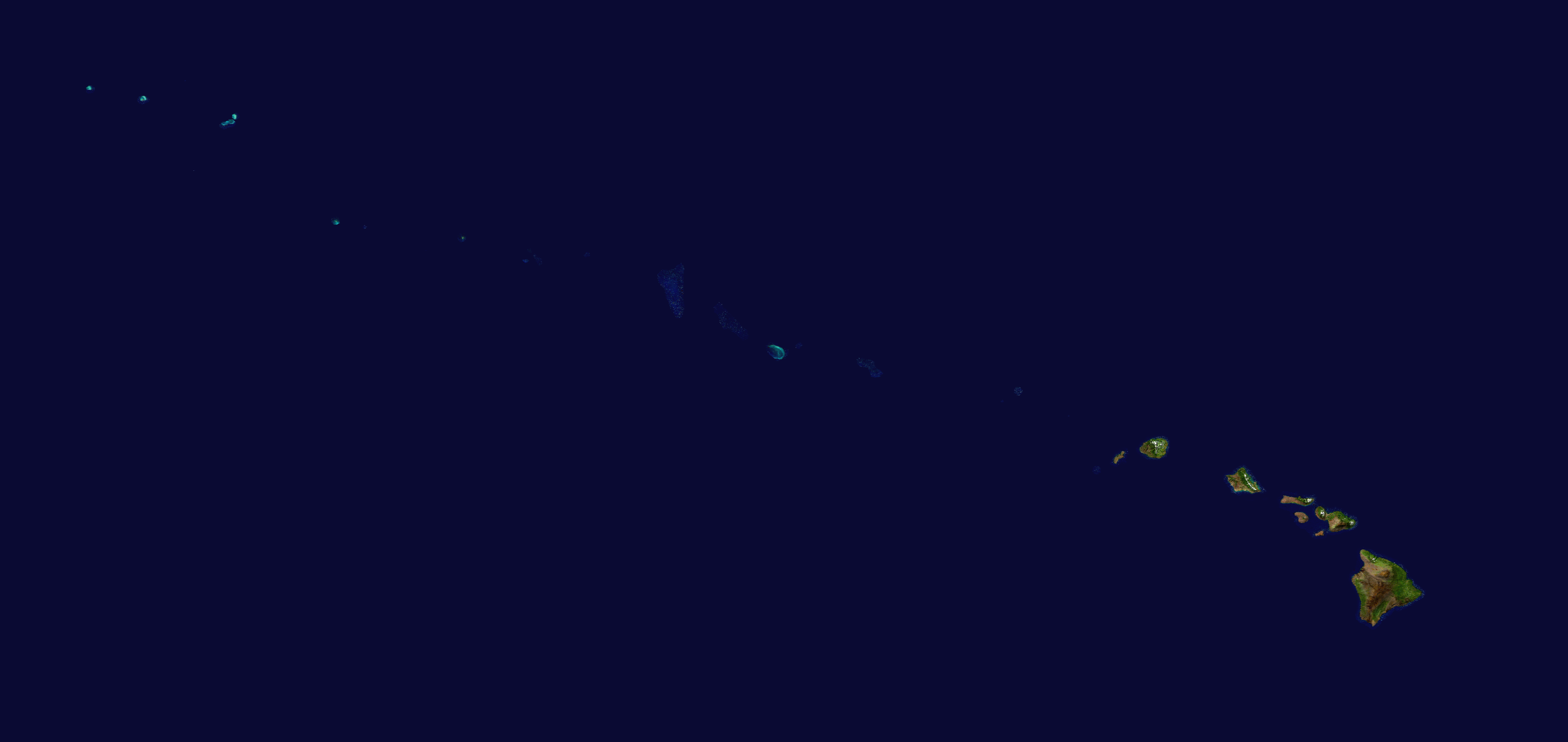
A composite satellite image from NASA of the Hawaiian Islands taken from outer space. Click on the image for a larger view that shows the main islands and the extended archipelago.

Partial islands, atolls, reefs—those west of Niʻihau are uninhabited except Midway Atoll—form the Northwestern Hawaiian Islands (Leeward Islands):

- Nīhoa (Mokumana)
- Necker (Mokumanamana)
- French Frigate Shoals (Kānemilohaʻi)
- Gardner Pinnacles (Pūhāhonu)
- Maro Reef (Nalukākala)
- Laysan (Kauō)
- Lisianski Island (Papaʻāpoho)
- Pearl and Hermes Atoll (Holoikauaua)
- Midway Atoll (Pihemanu)
- Kure Atoll (Mokupāpapa)

== Geology ==
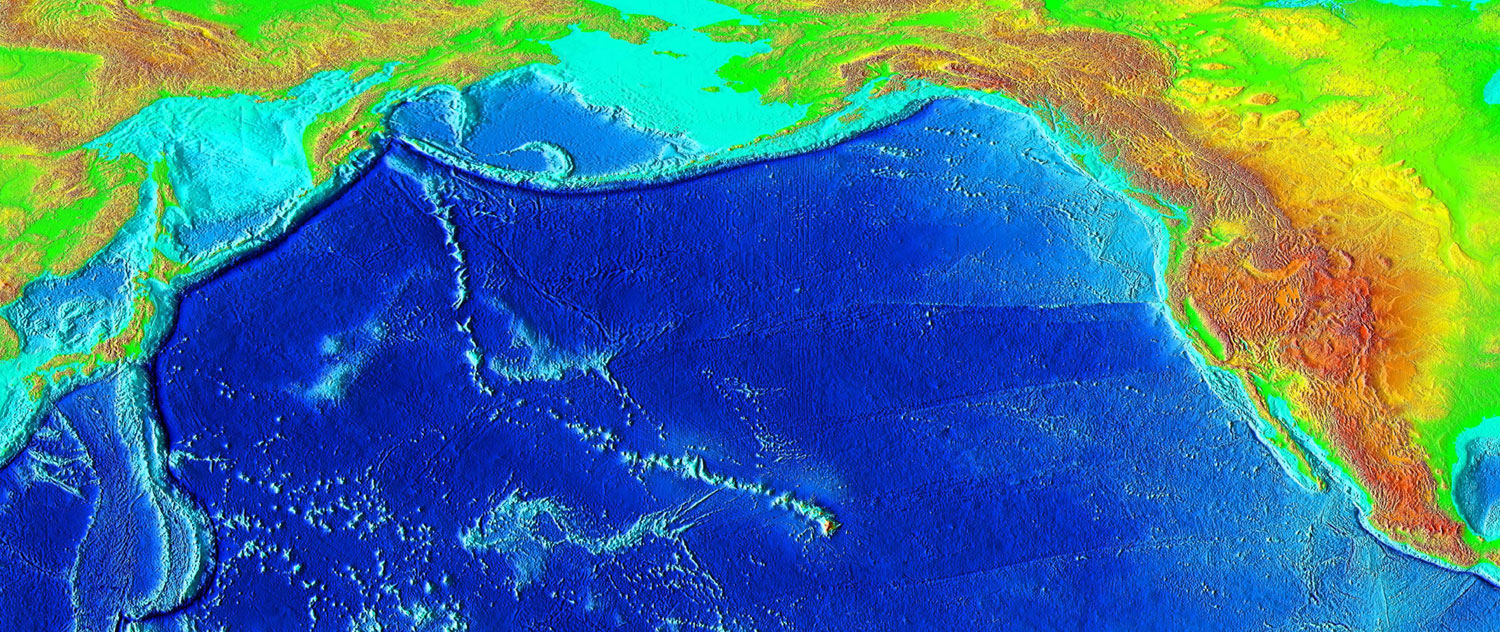
Eruptions from the Hawaii hotspot left a trail of underwater mountains across the Pacific over millions of years, called the Emperor Seamounts.

This chain of islands, or archipelago, developed as the Pacific Plate slowly moved northwestward over a hotspot in the Earth's mantle at a rate of approximately 32 miles (51 km) per million years. Thus, the southeast island is volcanically active, whereas the islands on the northwest end of the archipelago are older and typically smaller, due to longer exposure to erosion. The age of the archipelago has been estimated using potassium-argon dating methods. From this study and others, it is estimated that the northwesternmost island, Kure Atoll, is the oldest at approximately 28 million years (Ma); while the southeasternmost island, Hawaiʻi, is approximately 0.4 Ma (400,000 years). The only active volcanism in the last 200 years has been on the southeastern island, Hawaiʻi, and on the submerged but growing volcano to the extreme southeast, Kamaʻehuakanaloa (formerly Loʻihi). The Hawaiian Volcano Observatory of the USGS documents recent volcanic activity and provides images and interpretations of the volcanism. Kīlauea had been erupting nearly continuously since 1983 when it stopped August 2018.

Almost all of the magma of the hotspot has the composition of basalt, and so the Hawaiian volcanoes are composed almost entirely of this igneous rock. There is very little coarser-grained gabbro and diabase. Nephelinite is exposed on the islands but is extremely rare. The majority of eruptions in Hawaiʻi are Hawaiian-type eruptions because basaltic magma is relatively fluid compared with magmas typically involved in more explosive eruptions, such as the andesitic magmas that produce some of the spectacular and dangerous eruptions around the margins of the Pacific basin.

Hawaiʻi island (the Big Island) is the biggest and youngest island in the chain, built from five volcanoes. Mauna Loa, taking up over half of the Big Island, is the largest shield volcano on the Earth. The measurement from sea level to summit is more than 2.5 miles (4 km), from sea level to sea floor about 3.1 miles (5 km).

=== Earthquakes ===
The Hawaiian Islands have many earthquakes, generally triggered by and related to volcanic activity. Seismic activity, as a result, is currently highest in the southern part of the chain. Both historical and modern earthquake databases have correlated higher magnitude earthquakes with flanks of active volcanoes, such as Mauna Loa and Kilauea. The combination of erosional forces, which cause slumping and landslides, with the pressure exerted by rising magma put a great amount of stress on the volcanic flanks. The stress is released when the slope fails, or slips, causing an earthquake. This type of seismicity is unique because the forces driving the system are not always consistent over time, since rates of volcanic activity fluctuate. Seismic hazard near active, seaward volcanic flanks is high, partially because of the especially unpredictable nature of the forces that trigger earthquakes, and partially because these events occur at relatively shallow depths. Flank earthquakes typically occur at depths ranging from 5 to 20 km, increasing the hazard to local infrastructure and communities. Earthquakes and landslides on the island chain have also been known to cause tsunamis.

Most of the early earthquake monitoring took place in Hilo, by missionaries Titus Coan and Sarah J. Lyman and her family. Between 1833 and 1896, approximately 4 or 5 earthquakes were reported per year. Today, earthquakes are monitored by the Hawaiian Volcano Observatory run by the USGS.

Hawaii accounted for 7.3% of the United States' reported earthquakes with a magnitude 3.5 or greater from 1974 to 2003, with a total 1533 earthquakes. Hawaii ranked as the state with the third most earthquakes over this time period, after Alaska and California.

On October 15, 2006, there was an earthquake with a magnitude of 6.7 off the northwest coast of the island of Hawaii, near the Kona area. The initial earthquake was followed approximately five minutes later by a magnitude 5.7 aftershock. Minor to moderate damage was reported on most of the Big Island. Several major roadways became impassable from rock slides, and effects were felt as far away as Honolulu, Oahu, nearly 150 miles (240 km) from the epicenter. Power outages lasted for several hours to days. Several water mains ruptured. No deaths or life-threatening injuries were reported.

On May 4, 2018, there was a 6.9 earthquake in the zone of volcanic activity from Kīlauea.

Earthquakes are monitored by the Hawaiian Volcano Observatory run by the USGS.

=== Tsunamis ===
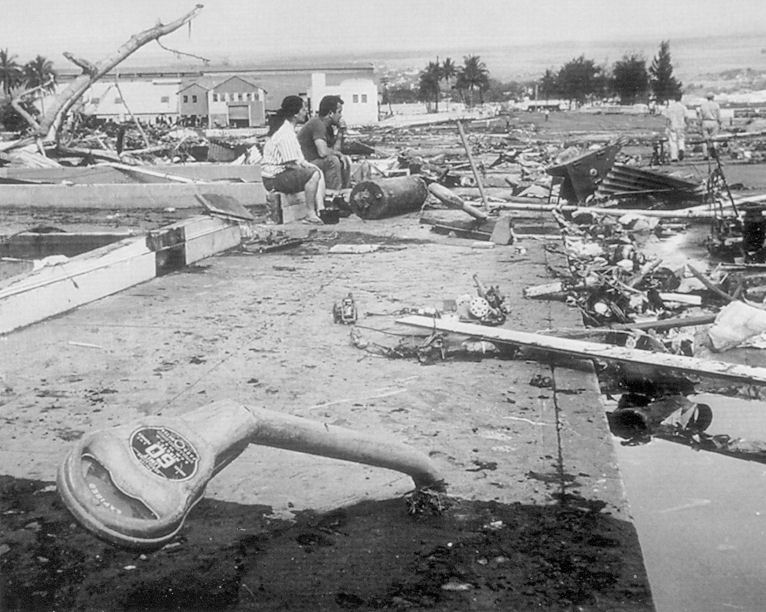
Aftermath of the 1960 Chilean tsunami in Hilo, Hawaiʻi, where the tsunami left 61 people dead and 282 seriously injured. The waves reached 35 feet (11 m) high.

The Hawaiian Islands are subject to tsunamis, great waves that strike the shore. Tsunamis are most often caused by earthquakes somewhere in the Pacific. The waves produced by the earthquakes travel at speeds of 400–500 miles per hour (600–800 km/h) and can affect coastal regions thousands of miles (kilometers) away.

Tsunamis may also originate from the Hawaiian Islands. Explosive volcanic activity can cause tsunamis. The island of Molokaʻi had a catastrophic collapse or debris avalanche over a million years ago; this underwater landslide likely caused tsunamis. The Hilina Slump on the island of Hawaiʻi is another potential place for a large landslide and resulting tsunami.

The city of Hilo on the Big Island has been most affected by tsunamis, where the in-rushing water is accentuated by the shape of Hilo Bay. Coastal cities have tsunami warning sirens.

A tsunami resulting from an earthquake in Chile hit the islands on February 27, 2010. It was relatively minor, but local emergency management officials utilized the latest technology and ordered evacuations in preparation for a possible major event. The Governor declared it a "good drill" for the next major event.

A tsunami resulting from an earthquake in Japan hit the islands on March 11, 2011. It was relatively minor, but local officials ordered evacuations in preparation for a possible major event. The tsunami caused about $30.1 million in damages.

=== Volcanoes ===
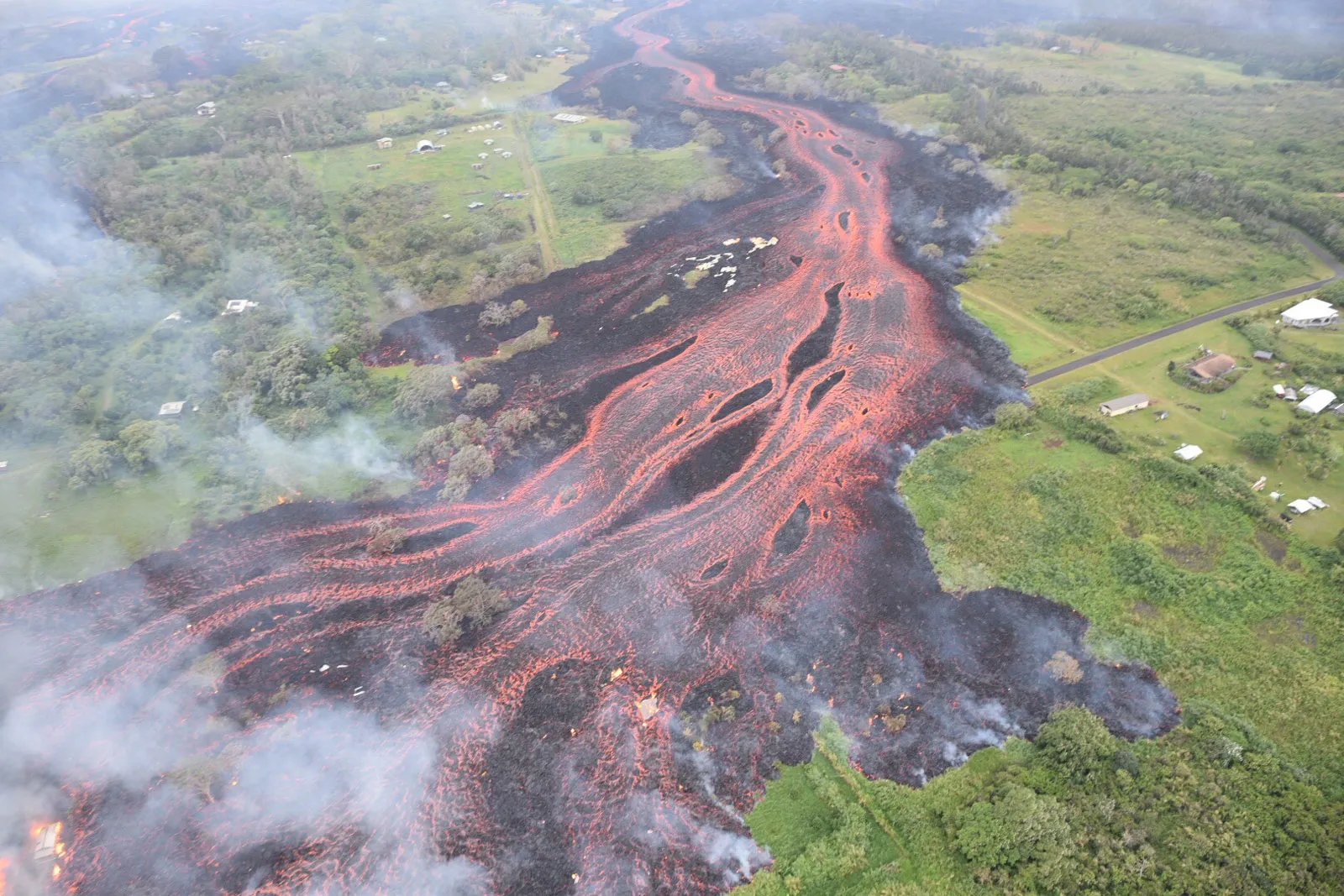
Lava erupting from Kīlauea, one of six active volcanoes in the Hawaiian islands. Kīlauea is the most active, erupting nearly continuously from 1983 to 2018.

Only the two Hawaiian islands furthest to the southeast have active volcanoes: Haleakalā on Maui, and Mauna Loa, Mauna Kea, Kilauea, and Hualalai, all on the Big Island. The volcanoes on the remaining islands are extinct as they are no longer over the Hawaii hotspot. The Kamaʻehuakanaloa Seamount is an active submarine volcano that is expected to become the newest Hawaiian island when it rises above the ocean's surface in 10,000–100,000 years. Hazards from these volcanoes include lava flows that can destroy and bury the surrounding surface, volcanic gas emissions, earthquakes and tsunamis listed above, submarine eruptions affecting the ocean, and the possibility of an explosive eruption.

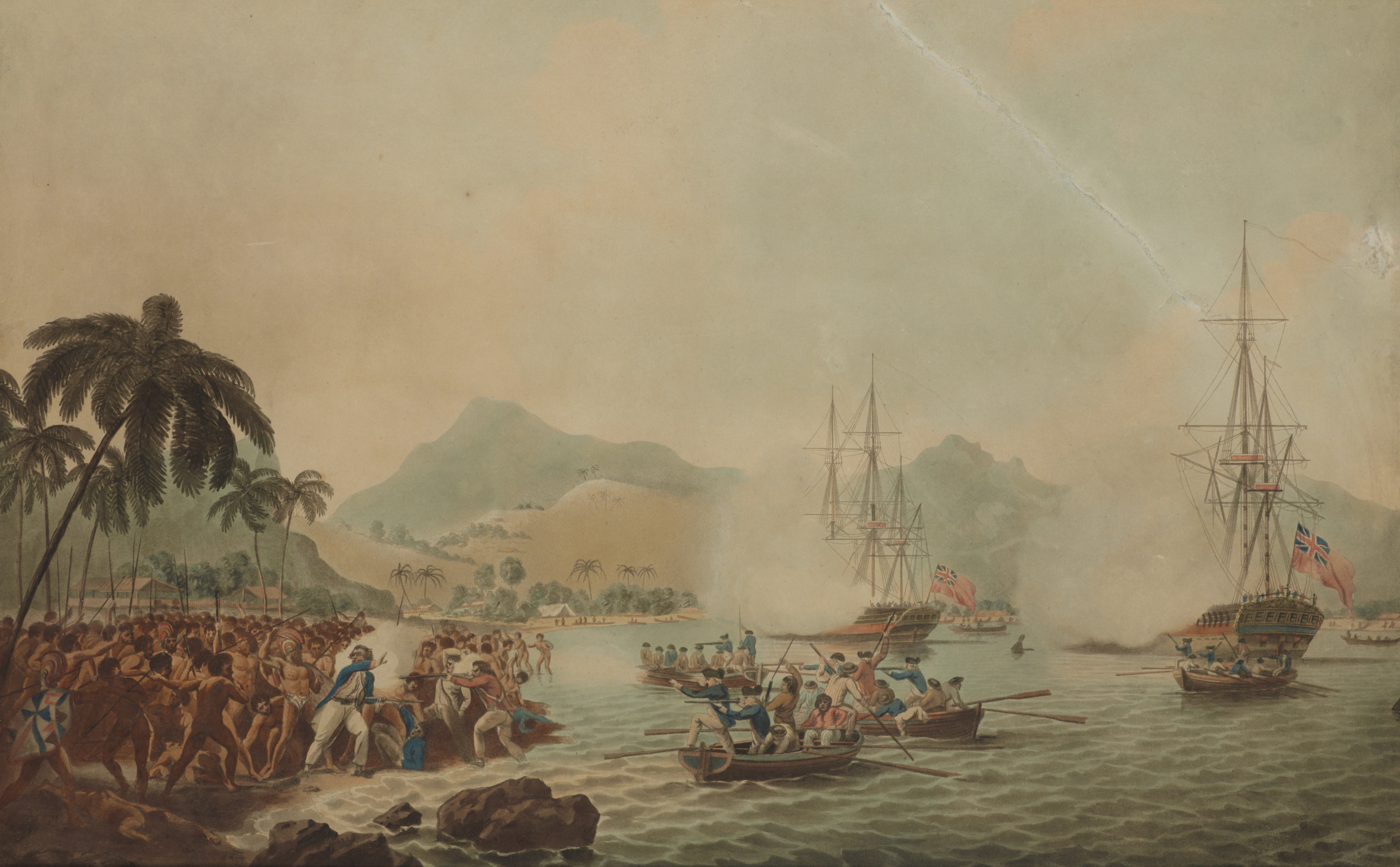
Captain James Cook's death at Kealakekua Bay on February 14, 1779 (painting by Francis Jukes, 1788)

== History ==
Hawaii was first discovered and settled by explorers from Tahiti or the Marquesas Islands. The date of the first settlements is the subject of continued debate. Kirch's textbooks on Hawaiian archeology date the first Polynesian settlements to about 300 C.E., although his more recent estimates are as late as 600. More recent surveys of carbon-dating evidence put the arrival of the first settlers at around 940–1130 C.E.

In January 1778, Great Britain and the Hawaiians came into contact when explorer James Cook and his crew sighted the islands during his third voyage of exploration. This became the first recorded and sustained contact between Europeans and Hawaiians. This had a significant impact on Hawaii, even in this initial limited interaction, introducing firearms to Hawaiian warfare. Aided by firearms and ships, Kamehameha I conquered and unified most of the islands in 1795, establishing the Kingdom of Hawaii. The unification was completed in 1810 when Kauaʻi and Niʻihau voluntarily joined the kingdom. This event marked the end of the long tradition of warfare among rival chiefs. The Kingdom was an internationally recognized sovereign state, being recognized by the United States, Japan, Great Britain, France, Spain, and other powers through treaties and diplomatic exchanges beginning in the 1820s. The United States signed its first treaty with Hawaii on December 23, 1826; France followed on July 17, 1839. The kingdom became prosperous and important for its agriculture and strategic location in the Pacific.

The group of islands did not have a single name, and each island was ruled separately. The names of the islands recorded by Captain Cook reflect this fact. Kamehameha I, as ruler of the island of Hawaii, imposed the name Hawaiʻi on the whole island group when he unified them as the Kingdom of Hawaiʻi.

American immigration, led by Protestant missionaries, and Native Hawaiian emigration, mostly on whaling ships but also in high numbers as indentured servants and as forced labor, began almost immediately after Cook's arrival. Americans established plantations to grow crops for export. Their farming methods required substantial labor. Waves of permanent immigrants came from Japan, China, and the Philippines to labor in the cane and pineapple fields. The government of Japan organized and gave special protection to its people, who comprised about 25 percent of the Hawaiian population by 1896. The Hawaiian monarchy encouraged this multi-ethnic society, initially establishing a constitutional monarchy in 1840 that promised equal voting rights regardless of race, gender, or wealth.

The population of Native Hawaiians declined precipitously from an unknown number prior to 1778 (estimated to be around 300,000). It fell to around 142,000 in the 1820s based on a census conducted by American missionaries, 82,203 in the 1850 Hawaiian Kingdom census, 40,622 in the final Hawaiian Kingdom census of 1890, 39,504 in the sole census by the Republic of Hawaii in 1896, and 37,656 in the first census conducted by the United States in 1900. Thereafter the Native Hawaiian population in Hawaii increased with every census, reaching 680,442 in 2020 (including people of mixed heritage).

== Ecology ==
The islands are home to a multitude of endemic species. Each group of settlers, beginning with Polynesians, introduced non-native trees, plants, and animals. These included species such as rats and pigs that have preyed on native species that evolved in their absence. Humans created deforestation, leading to treeless grasslands. Terrestrial and marine environmental degradation became widespread. As a result, many species that depended on forest habitats and food became extinct—with many species facing extinction. Humans cleared land for farming and imported industrialized farming practices. Monocultural crop production replaced multi-species systems.

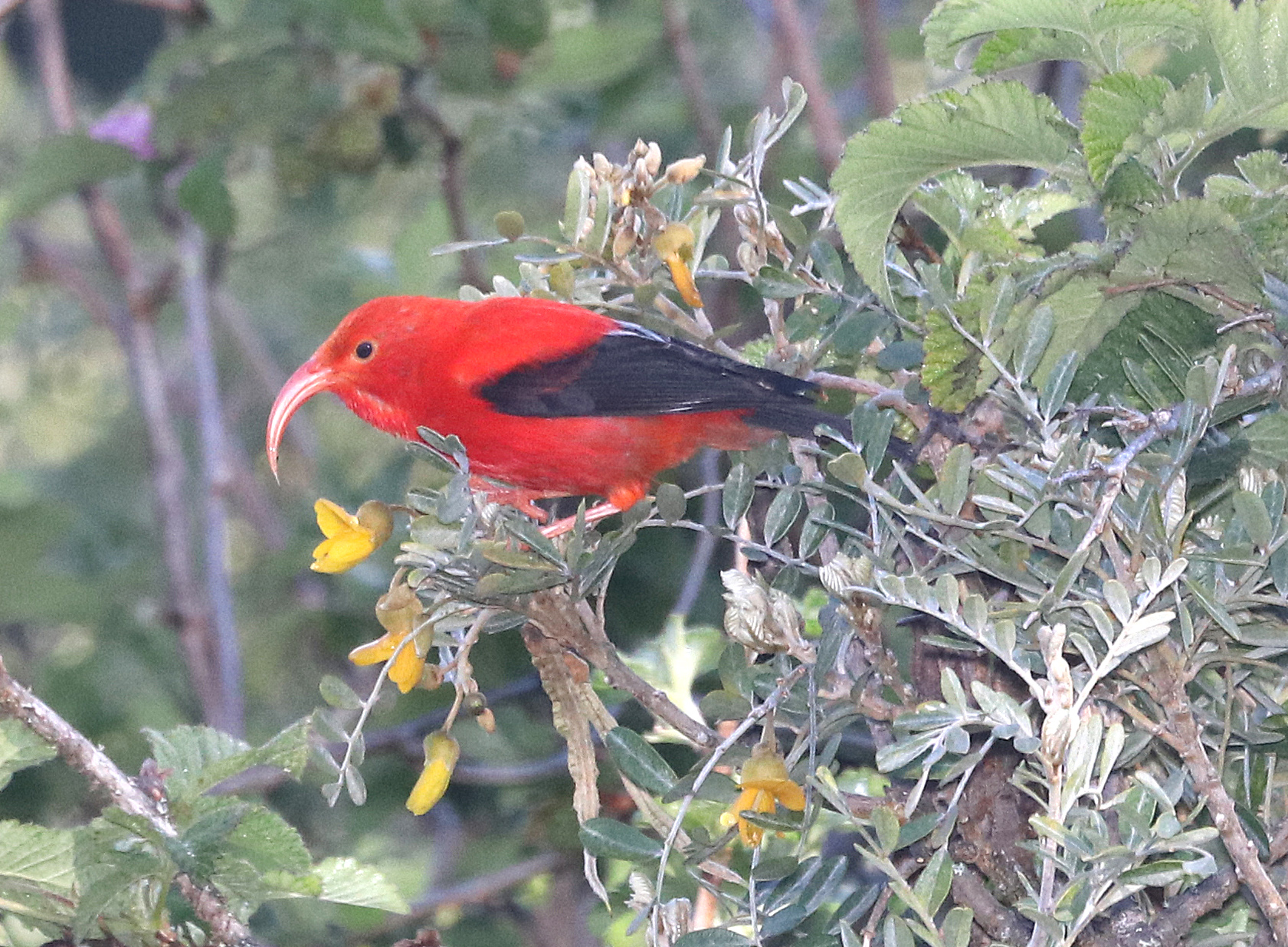
'I'iwi (Drepanis coccinea) and other endemic species have been heavily impacted by human activity, such as invasive species and habitat loss

Europeans promoted large-scale monoculture, focused on exports. This led many more species to be added to the list of extinct animals of the Hawaiian Islands. As of 2009, many of the remaining endemic species were rated endangered.

== National Monument ==
On June 15, 2006, President George W. Bush issued a public proclamation creating Papahānaumokuākea Marine National Monument under the Antiquities Act of 1906. The Monument encompasses the northwestern Hawaiian Islands and surrounding waters, forming the largest marine wildlife reserve in the world. In August 2010, UNESCO's World Heritage Committee added Papahānaumokuākea to its list of World Heritage Sites. On August 26, 2016, former President Barack Obama greatly expanded Papahānaumokuākea, quadrupling it from its original size.

== Climate ==
The Hawaiian Islands are tropical but experience many different climates, depending on altitude and surroundings. The islands receive most rainfall from the trade winds on their north and east flanks (the windward side) as a result of orographic precipitation. Coastal areas in general and especially the south and west flanks, or leeward sides, tend to be drier.

In general, the lowlands of Hawaiian Islands receive most of their precipitation during the winter months (October to April). Drier conditions generally prevail from May to September. The tropical storms, and occasional hurricanes, tend to occur from July through November.

During the summer months the average temperature is about 84 °F (29 °C), in the winter months it is approximately 79 °F (26 °C). As the temperature is relatively constant over the year the probability of dangerous thunderstorms is approximately low.

== See also ==
- Hawaii Inter-Island Cable System
- Index of Hawaii-related articles
- List of birds of Hawaii
- List of fish of Hawaii
- List of mountain peaks of Hawaii
- List of Ultras of Hawaii
- Maritime fur trade
- Outline of Hawaii
- List of islands of Hawaii
