= Lehua Rock Light =

Lighthouse located on Lehua, Hawaii

- Location: Lehua Island, Kauaʻi County, Hawaii
- Coordinates: 22°01′08.4″N 160°05′53.9″W
- Constructed: April 24, 1931
- Construction: concrete (foundation); fiberglass (pole)
- Height: 10 feet (3.0 m)
- Shape: cylindrical turret
- Operator: United States Coast Guard

Light
- Focal height: 704 feet (215 m)
- Light source: LED
- Range: 9 nautical miles (17 km; 10 mi)
- Characteristic: Fl W 4s
- no.: USCG 6-29935; Admiralty: G7540

The Lehua Rock Light is a lighthouse beacon located on Kaunuakalā, the summit of Lehua Island in Hawaii. Built in 1931 at an elevation of 704 ft above sea level, it is the highest lighted ocean navigation beacon in the world.

== History ==
On August 10, 1928, the U.S. federal government selected Lehua Island in the Territory of Hawaii as the site of a lighthouse under the control of the Department of Commerce. The islet is just north of Niʻihau, a privately owned island which does not allow navigational lights. The light was designed to serve as a navigation aid for both islands.

On April 24, 1931, the United States Lighthouse Service installed an automatic gas-powered light built on a concrete tower on Kaunuakalā, the summit of Lehua. The light became the highest beacon in the Service and was reported to be among the most challenging to construct. Materials were unloaded at a landing on the southern side of the islet and moved to the summit using a derrick and a hoist powered by a gasoline engine. An acetylene gas supply facility was built on a 60 ft bluff west of the landing and pipes were connected to the summit. The light was visible at a range of 15 miles.

The Lighthouse Service merged with the U.S. Coast Guard in 1939, and ownership of the island and its lighthouse were ceded to the military. The Coast Guard has managed the operation of the lighthouse since the merger.

In 1989, the structure was replaced with a solar powered beacon mounted to the top of a 10 ft fiberglass pole. In 2025, a Coast Guard helicopter crew based in Oʻahu used an MH-65 Dolphin to replace the Carmanah LED beacon.

At present, the lighthouse consists of a white cylindrical turret mounted on a concrete base. The beacon is fixed to a fiberglass pole and emits a white light every 4 seconds with a nominal range of 9 nautical miles.

Location of Lehua Island beside Kauaʻi (right) and Ni'ihau (below)

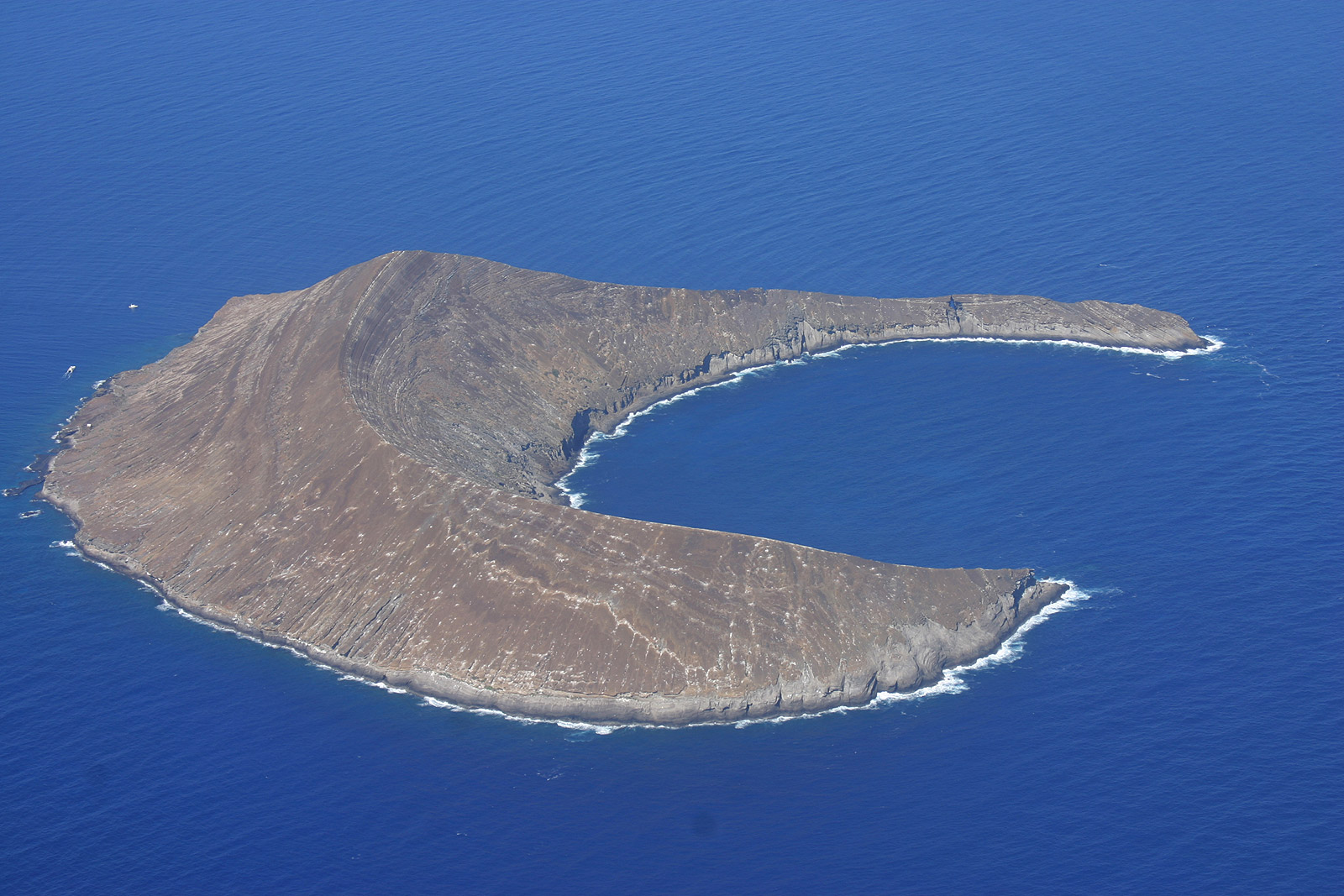
Aerial view of Lehua

== See also ==
- List of lighthouses in Hawaii
