= Kauhola Point Light =

Kauhola Point Light station
- Coordinates: 20°14′43″N 155°46′19″W
- 1987 lighthouse
- Constructed: 1897
- Markings: white (tower)
- Deactivated: 1933
- 1917 lighthouse
- Constructed: 1917
- Lens: fourth order Fresnel lens
- 1933 lighthouse
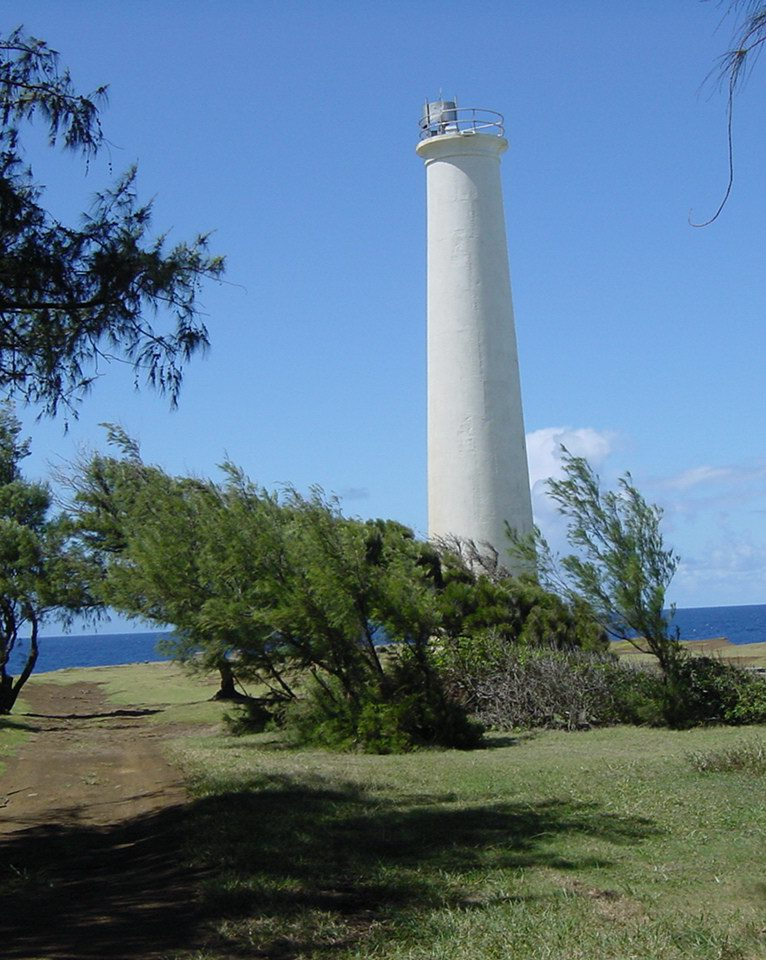
- Kauhola Point Light, demolished in December 2009
- Construction: reinforced concrete (tower)
- Height: 86 ft (26 m)
- Shape: cylinder
- First lit: 1933
- Deactivated: 2009
- 2009 lighthouse
- Construction: stainless steel pole
- Power source: solar power
- Operator: United States Coast Guard
- First lit: 2009
- Focal height: 116 m (381 ft)
- Range: 10 nmi (19 km; 12 mi)
- Characteristic: Fl W 15s

Kauhola Point Lighthouse was located near Kapa'au, on the "Big Island" of Hawaii, near the northern tip of the island.

On December 12, 2009, this structure was demolished due to erosion near its base.

== See also ==
- List of lighthouses in Hawaii
