= Barbers Point Light (Hawaii) =

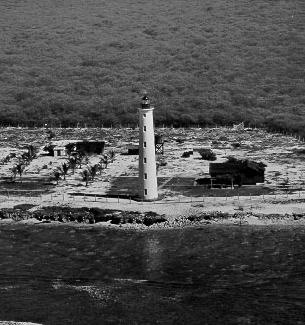
- the second tower ca. 1934 (USCG)
- Location: Barbers Point; Kapolei; Oahu
- Coordinates: 21°17′47.0″N 158°06′22.3″W

Tower
- Constructed: 1888
- Foundation: masonry
- Construction: concrete
- Automated: 1964
- Height: 42 feet (13 m) (first tower); 72 feet (22 m) (second tower)
- Shape: cylindrical tower with balcony and lantern removed in 1964
- Markings: white tower
- Operator: City of Honolulu; Department of Parks and Recreation (Barbers Point Beach Park)

Light
- First lit: 1888 (first tower); 1933 (second tower)
- Focal height: 85 feet (26 m) (second tower)
- Lens: fourth-order Fresnel lens (original), aerobeacon DCB-224 (current)
- Range: 24 nautical miles (44 km; 28 mi)
- Characteristic: Fl W 7.5s.

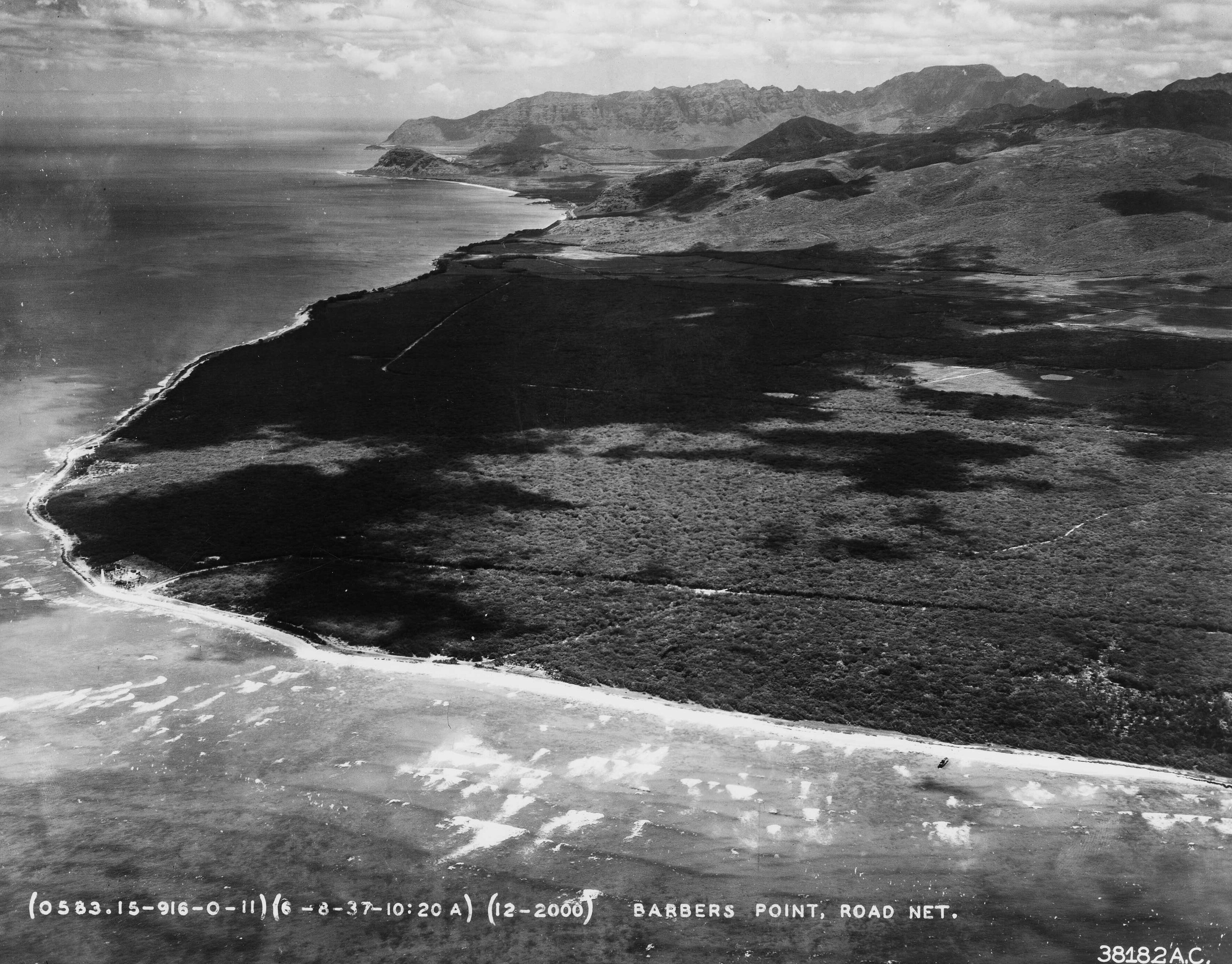
Barbers Point, 1937

Barbers Point Light is a lighthouse on the island of Oahu in Hawaii. The lighthouse stands on Barbers Point outside of Kalaeloa on the southwest tip of the island. It is named after Captain Henry Barber. The lighthouse was established in 1888. A second tower was built in 1933. The light was listed on the National Register of Historic Places in 2024.

== Keepers ==
- William Hatton Aalona 1888 – 1907
- Isaac Kalua 1907
- Harry Gregson 1907 – 1909
- William F. Williams 1909
- Samuel Apolo Amalu 1909 – 1913
- Robert I. Reid 1913 – 1916
- Manuel Ferreira 1916 – 1925
- Charles K. Akana 1925 – 1929
- Samuel Apolo Amalu 1929 – 1941
- John M. Sweeney 1941
- Manuel Ferreira 1942 – 1944
- James Conrad 1945 - 1947
- Fred E. Robins Sr. 1953 – 1964

== See also ==
- List of lighthouses in Hawaii
