= Kaʻula =

Islet in Kauai County, Hawaii

Coordinates: 21°39′17″N 160°32′29″W

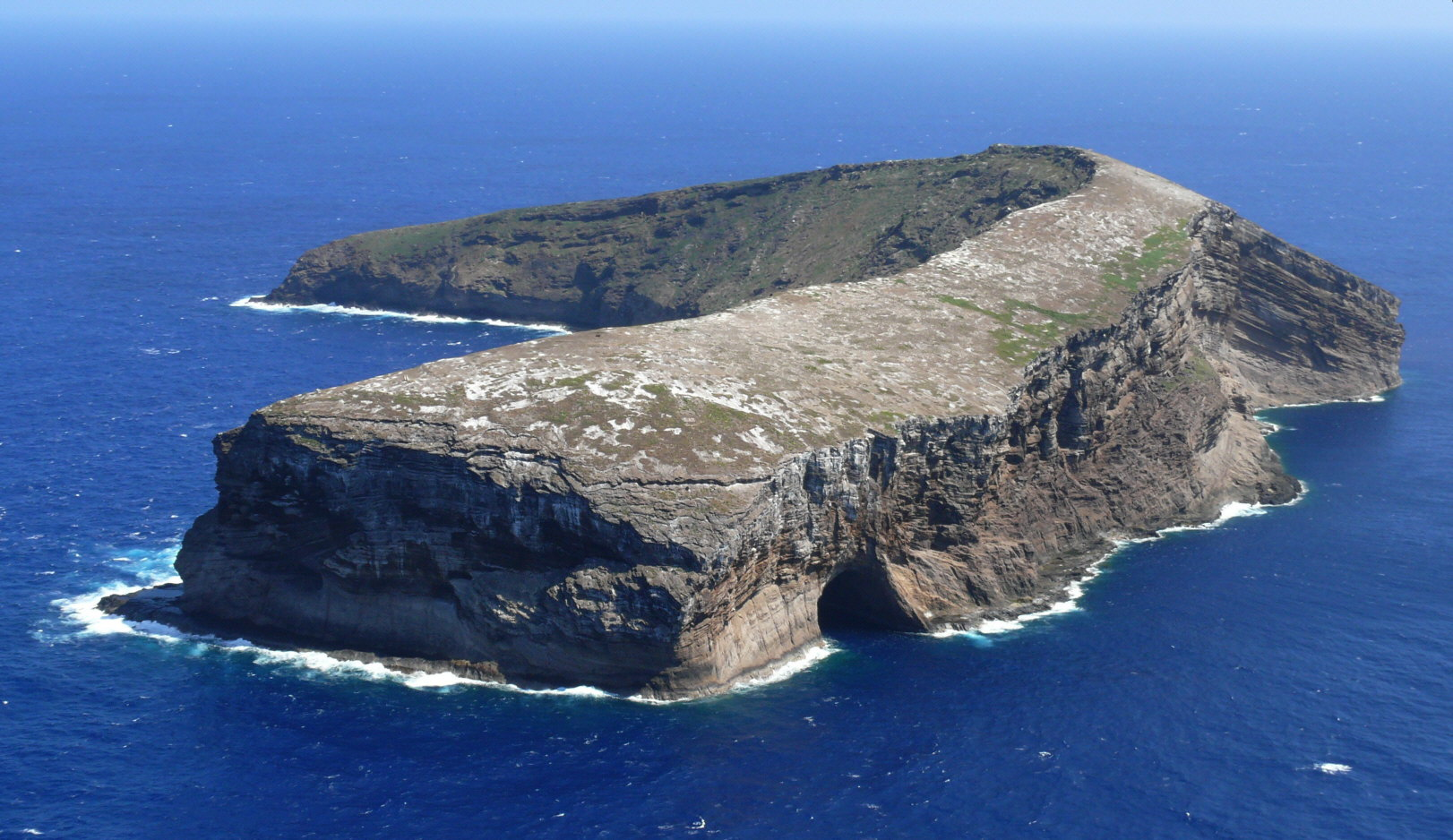
Kaʻula Island viewed from the north on May 8, 2008.

Kaʻula Island, also called Kaʻula Rock, is a small, crescent-shaped island in the Hawaiian Islands. It is located 22 miles southwest of Niʻihau.

== Mythology ==
In the legend of Papa and Wākea, Kaʻula is the seventh-born child.

== Geography ==
Kaʻula is located 23 mi (20 nmi; 37 km) west-southwest of Kawaihoa Point on Niʻihau, and about 150 nmi (173 mi; 278 km) west of Honolulu. The island is the top of a volcanic tuff cone that rests on top of a larger, submerged shield volcano. At its highest point, the island reaches a height of 548 ft (167 m). The ocean has carved large sea cliffs on the sides of the island. There is a large cave on the northwest side of the island called Kahalauaola (Shark Cave).

The United States Census Bureau defines Kaʻula as Census Tract 411 of Kauaʻi County, Hawaiʻi. The 2000 census showed that the uninhabited island had a land area of 158.2 acres (0.640 km^{2}; 0.2472 sq mi). Because of erosion, the island is slowly shrinking.

Kaʻula, which he spelled as "Tahoora", was one of the first five islands sighted by Captain James Cook in 1778.

== Lighthouse ==
A lighthouse was completed on the island in 1932 by the United States Lighthouse Service, which became part of the United States Coast Guard in 1939. The lighthouse remained in operation through 1947.

== Military use ==
The island has been used as a bombing range by the United States Navy since at least 1952. Inert ordnance is currently used, although live explosive ordnance has been used in the past. There is a risk of unexploded ordnance on the island. Permission from the U.S. Navy is required to land on the island. In 1978, over the objection of the U.S. Navy, the state of Hawaiʻi claimed ownership of Kaʻula and named the island a State Seabird Sanctuary. A final determination of ownership has not yet been made, and the Navy still uses the southeast point of the island as an aerial bombing and strafing target.

== Diving ==
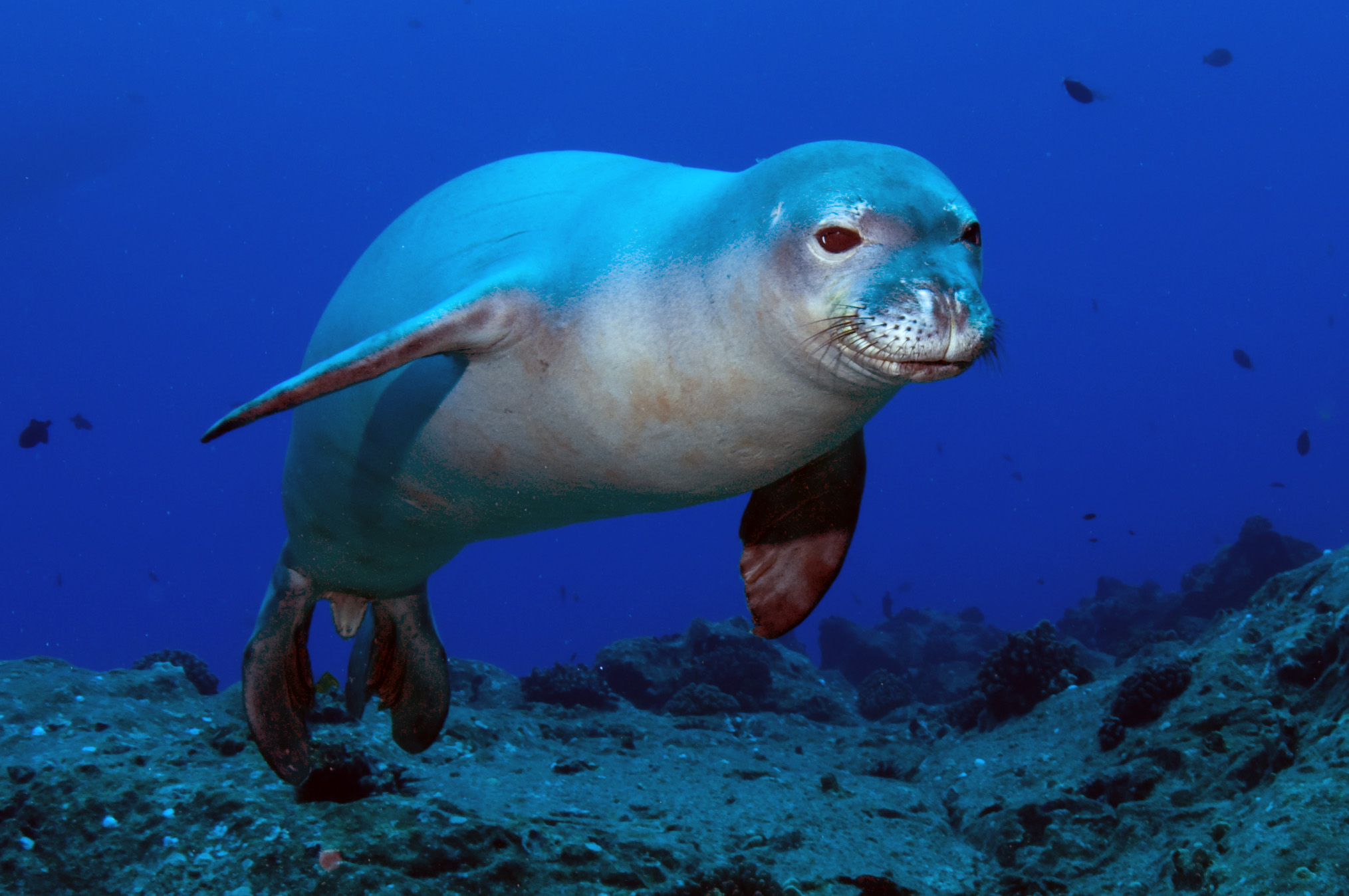
A Hawaiian monk seal at the Five Fathom Pinnacle on May 24, 2009.

Kaʻula is uninhabited, but fishermen and scuba divers frequently visit the island. Five Fathom Pinnacle, 3 mi (2.6 nmi; 4.8 km) west-northwest of Kaʻula, is also a noted dive spot.

== See also ==
- List of volcanoes in the Hawaiian–Emperor seamount chain
- List of islands
- Desert island
