= Moku Manu =

Island in Honolulu County, Hawaii, United States

Coordinates: 21°28′12″N 157°43′12″W

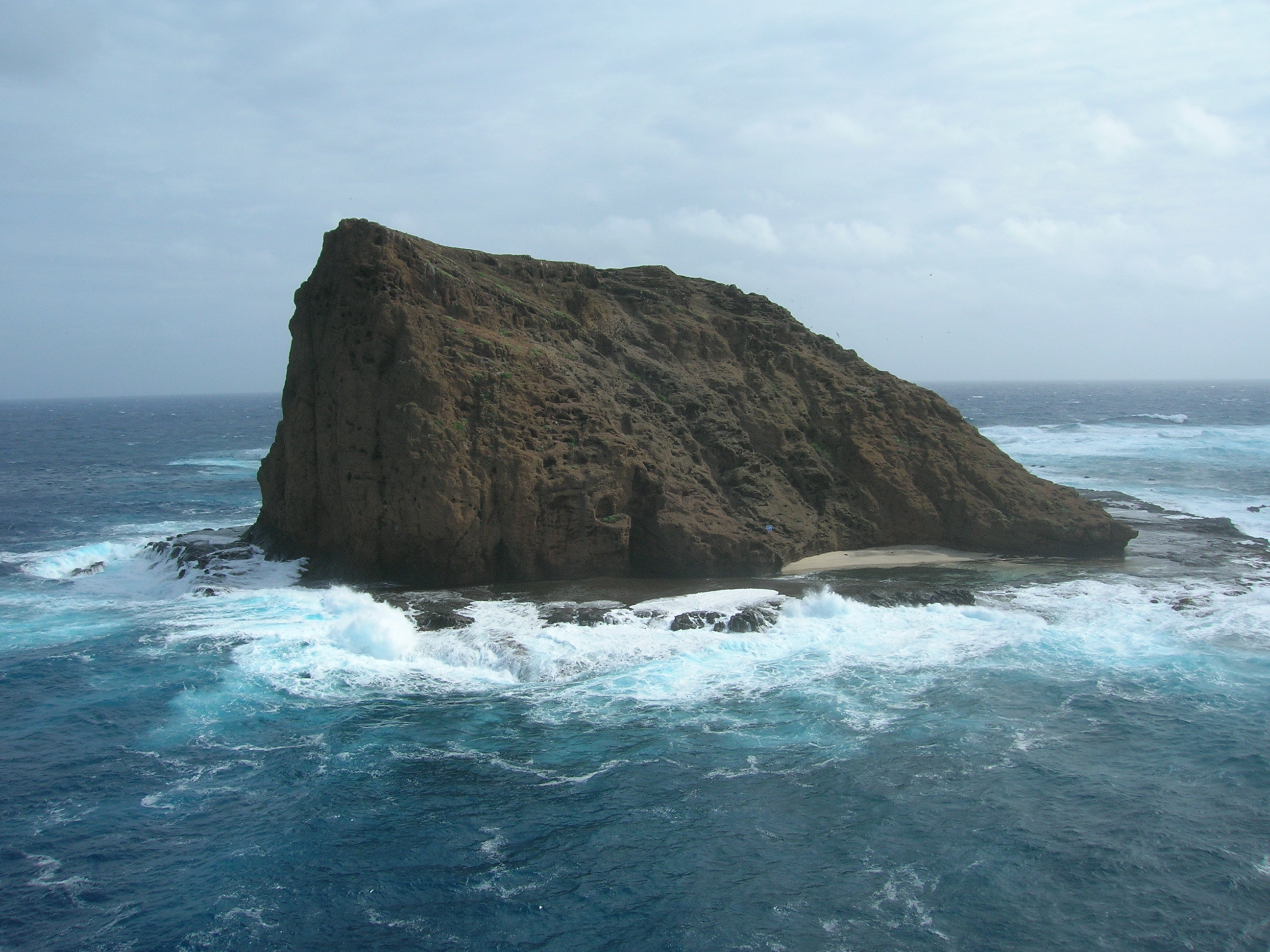
- Moku Manu from the air
- Etymology: "Bird Island" in Hawaiian

Geography
- Location: Pacific Ocean
- Highest elevation: 202 ft (61.6 m)

Administration
- United States

Demographics
- Population: 0

Moku Manu, or Bird Island in the Hawaiian language, is an offshore islet of Oahu, three-quarters of a mile off Mokapu Peninsula. Moku Manu and an adjacent small islet are connected by an underwater dike. The island was formed from debris flung from a vent of the nearby Kailua Volcano. Its highest point is 202 feet (62 m) high, bordered by near-vertical cliffs on many sides. Moku Manu is protected as a state seabird sanctuary like its neighbors to the south, Mānana, Kāohikaipu, and Mōkōlea Rock. Regardless, landing by boat is nearly impossible due to the lack of a safe beach.

Moku Manu's isolated nature makes it an excellent nesting site. Eleven species of seabird nest on Moku Manu, along with several species of migrating shorebird.

== See also ==
- Honolulu Volcanics
