= Nakalele Point =

Landmass and blowhole in Maui

Coordinates: 21°1′44″N 156°35′20″W

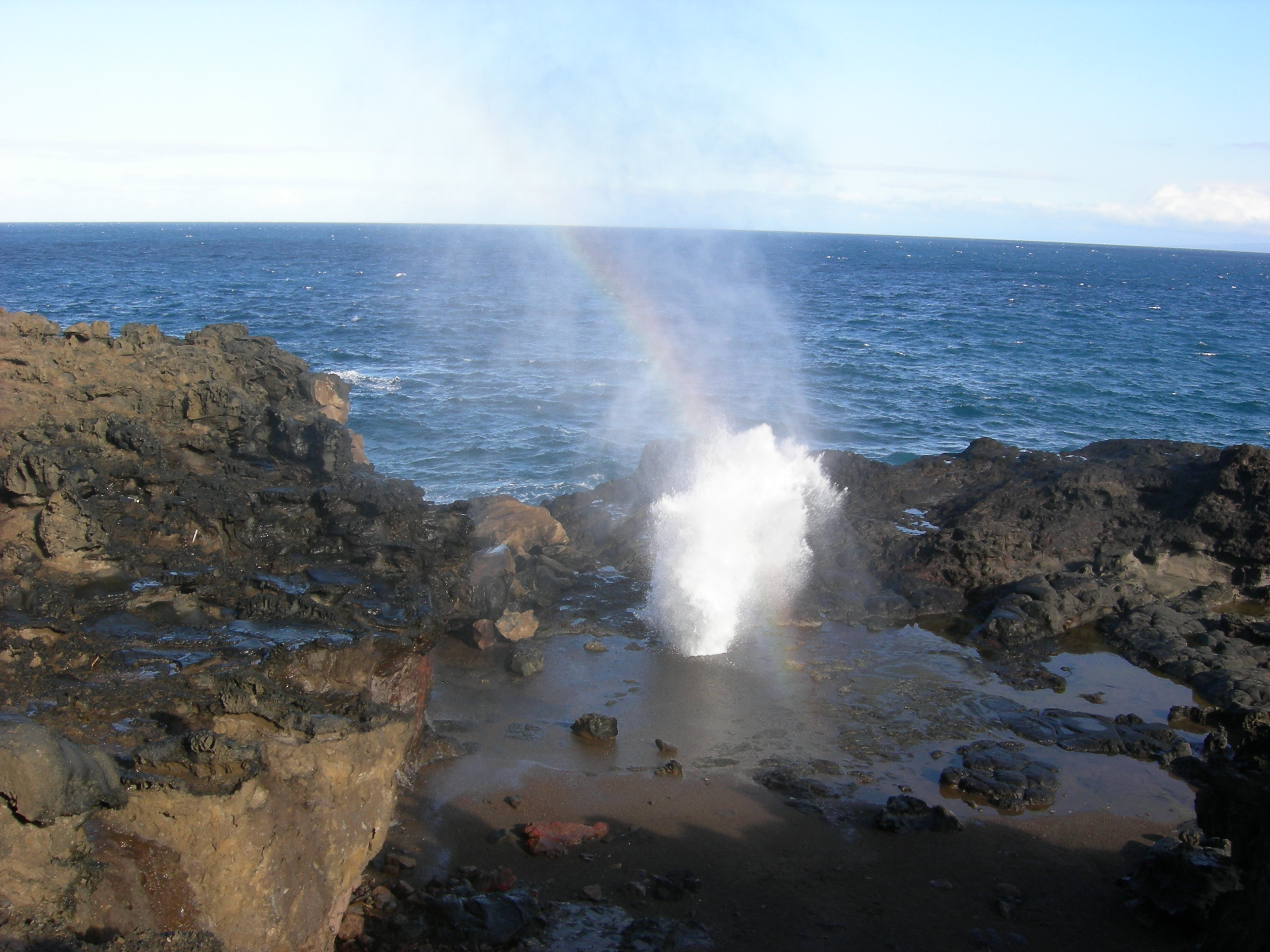
Nakalele blowhole Watch a movie of the blowhole "erupting".

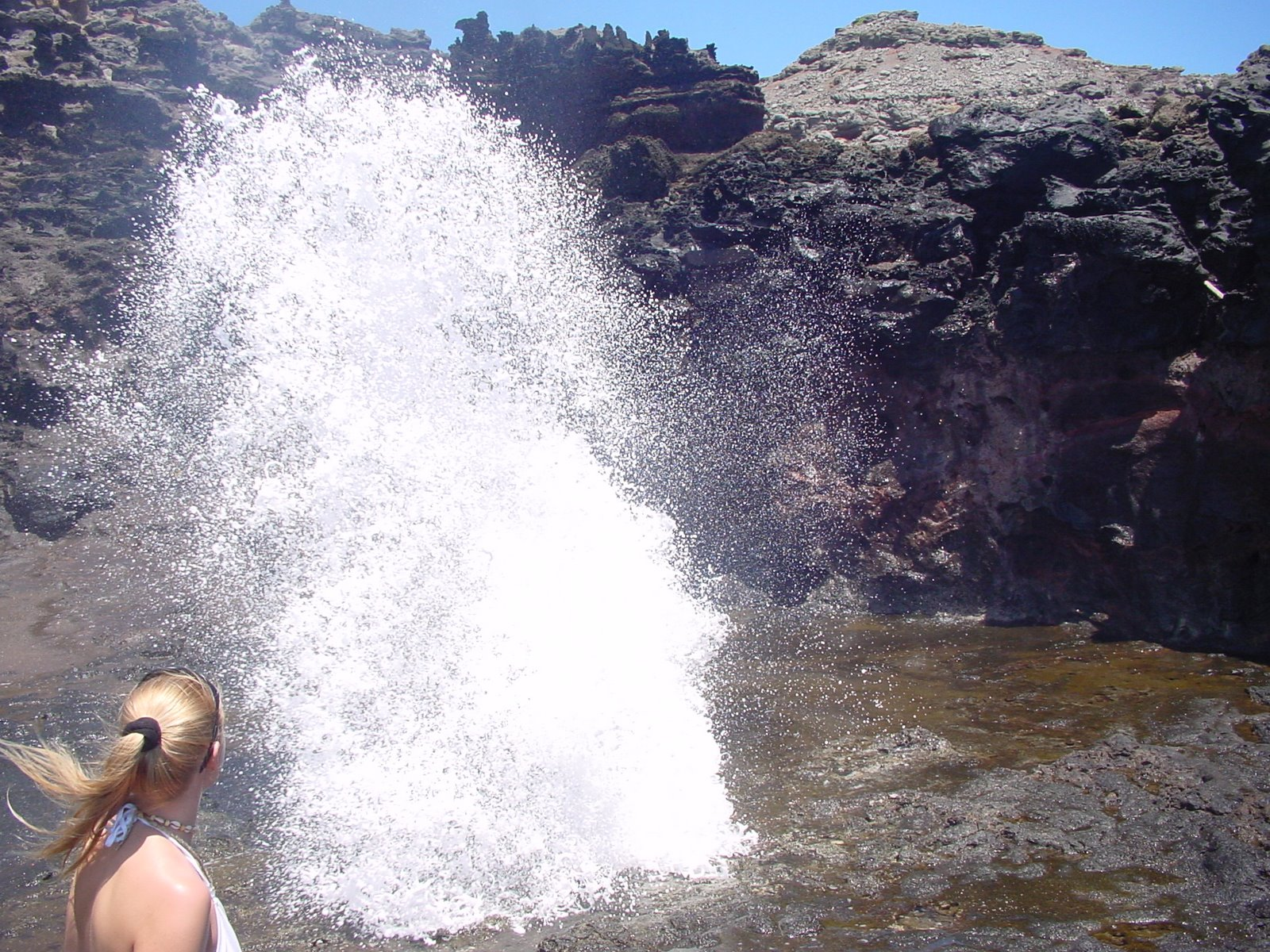
Closeup of Nakalele Blowhole

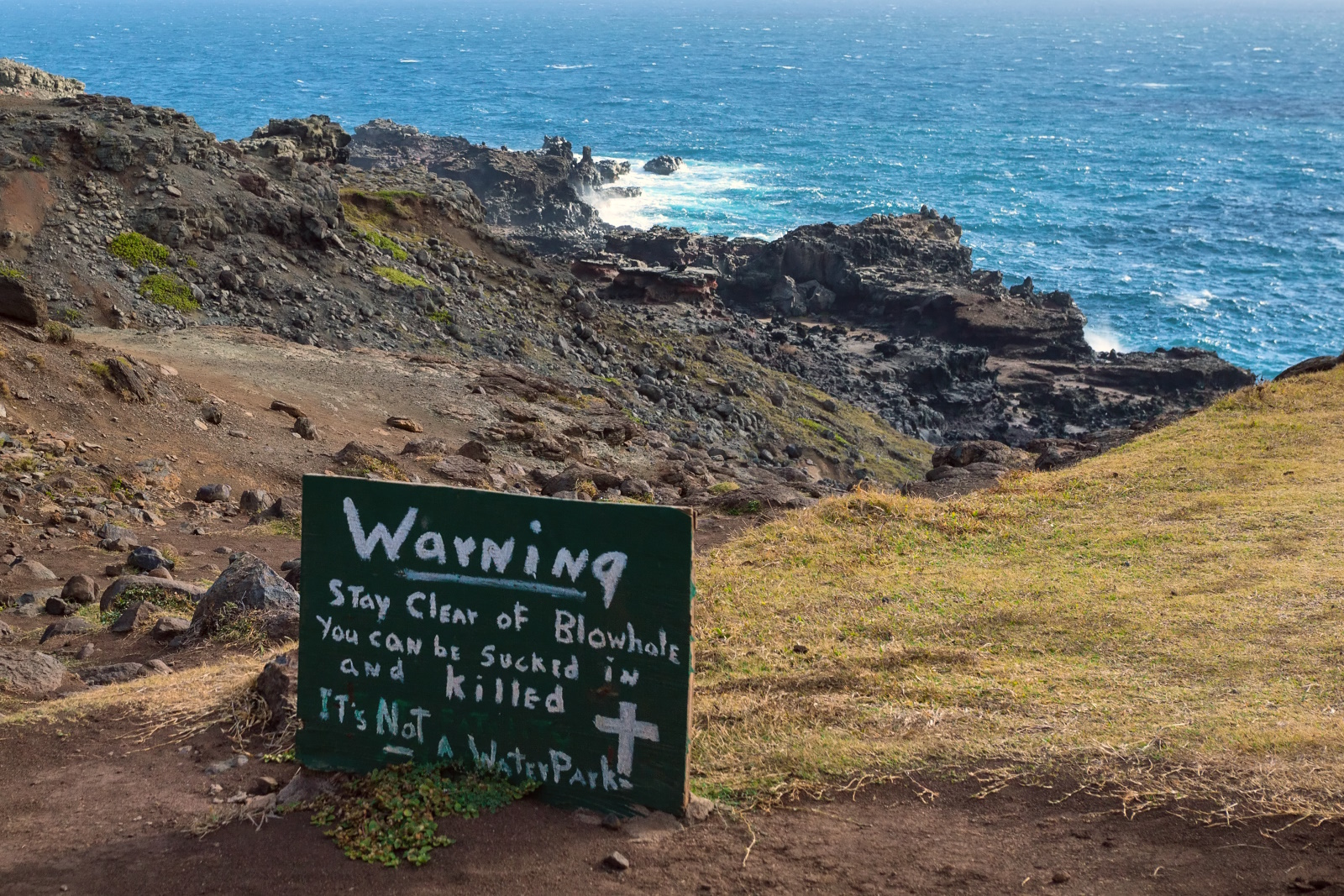
Warning sign at Nakalele Point

Nakalele Point is a land mass on the eastern edge of the northern tip of the island of Maui in the state of Hawaiʻi. In Hawaiian, Nakalele or Nā-kālele means "the leaning". The Point is known for its blowhole and has become notable for its dangerous conditions when waves crash in. The point and blowhole are located just east of Poelua Bay along Highway 30 near mile marker 39.

== Blowhole ==
Nakalele Point is famous for a blowhole which produces powerful geyser-like water spouts with the waves and tides. Water spewed from the blowhole can rise as high as 100 feet in the air. Visitors to the site should never stand between the blowhole and the ocean, and visitors should never turn their backs on the ocean as rogue waves could cause injury at any time. Only one person is confirmed to have been sucked into the blowhole and died.

Here is area video of the area showing hikers visiting the blowhole, and the size of the geyser.

== Lighthouse ==
A lighthouse was erected around 1908 at Nakalele Point. It originally consisted of a 40 feet (12 m) high wooden mast on top of which a temporary light was placed. By 1910, an actual dwelling was built with boxlike platform on its roof for a fixed white light. In 1922, the light was automated so that it would flash. The lighthouse is currently owned by the United States Coast Guard.
