= Mōkōlea Rock =

Islet in Hawaii

Coordinates: 21°25′55″N 157°43′10″W

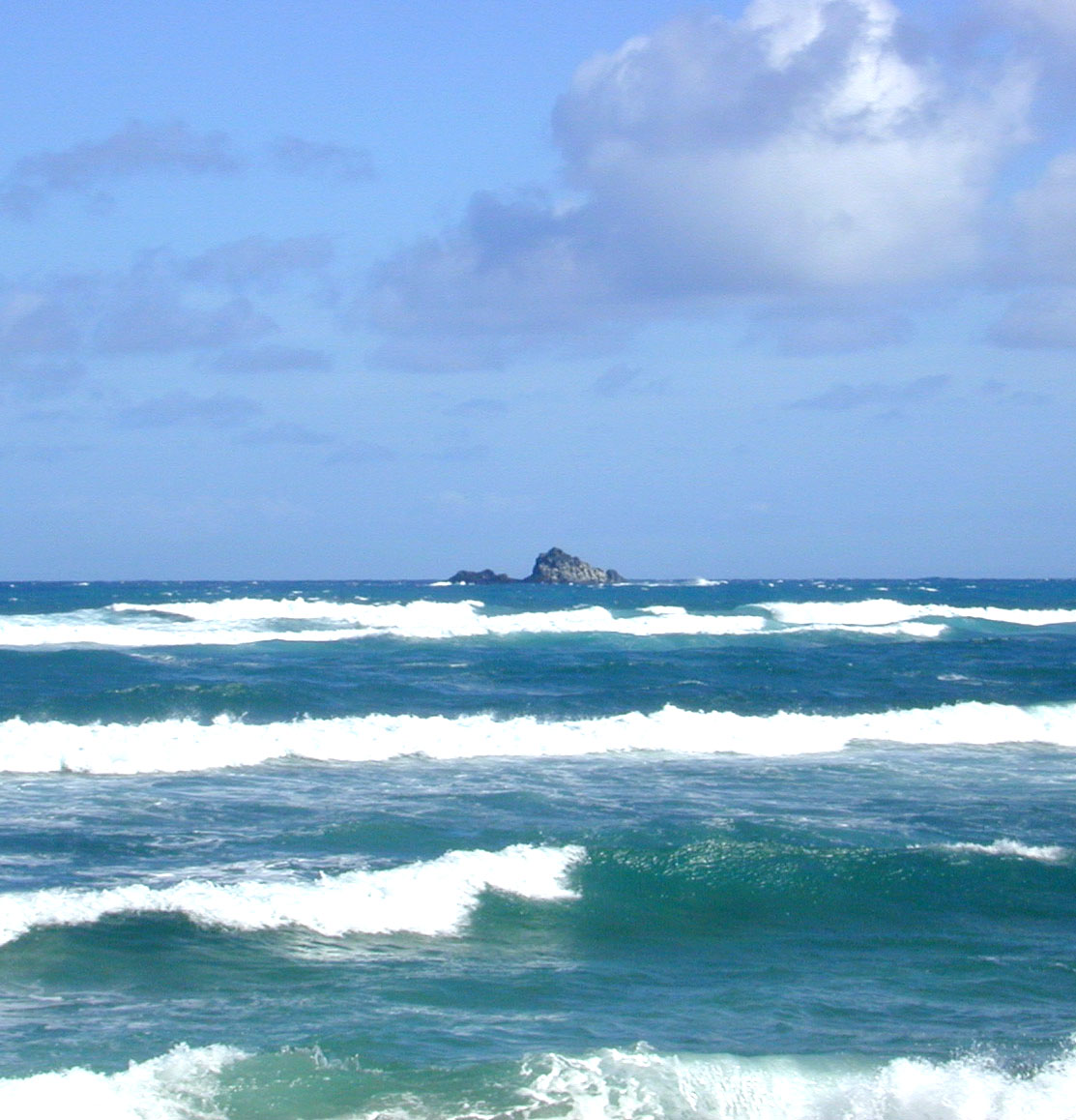
Mōkōlea Rock in Kailua Bay, Oʻahu, Hawaiʻi, 2.2 km (1.37 mi) off North Beach, Marine Corps Base Hawaii.

Mōkōlea Rock is an islet in Kailua Bay along the windward coast of Oʻahu in Hawaiʻi and located east of Marine Corps Base Hawaii (MCBH). Like most of the small islets off the coastline of a major island in the Hawaiian Islands, Mōkōlea is a State Bird Sanctuary containing many types of birds. Access to the islet requires a permit, and is only allowed to people involved in protecting the islet's fauna. The islet is more commonly known to local residents as "Birdshit Island", "Birdshit", or simply "Bird" because its black lava rock surface is heavily coated with bird droppings.

There is no vegetation on the islet, which is actually three connected outcroppings, the highest of which is no more than 25 feet (7.6 m) above mean sea level. All three consist of barren, jagged lava. Mokolea is part of the windward rim of the Kawainui volcanic caldera. About 300 feet (91 m) from this outcropping on the side facing Kailua Beach a shelf juts up from deep water to a depth of 25 to 30 feet (7.6 to 9.1 m). The shelf is a moderately interesting spot for scuba diving, although much of the time the area is rough, and anchoring a boat is difficult.

Mokolea has been described as a shore dive by some, but it should not be attempted from the shore due to strong currents and the distance between the dive spot and Kailua Beach.

== See also ==
- Honolulu Volcanics
