= Lehua =

Island in Kauaʻi County, Hawaiʻi

Coordinates: 22°01′12″N 160°05′51″W

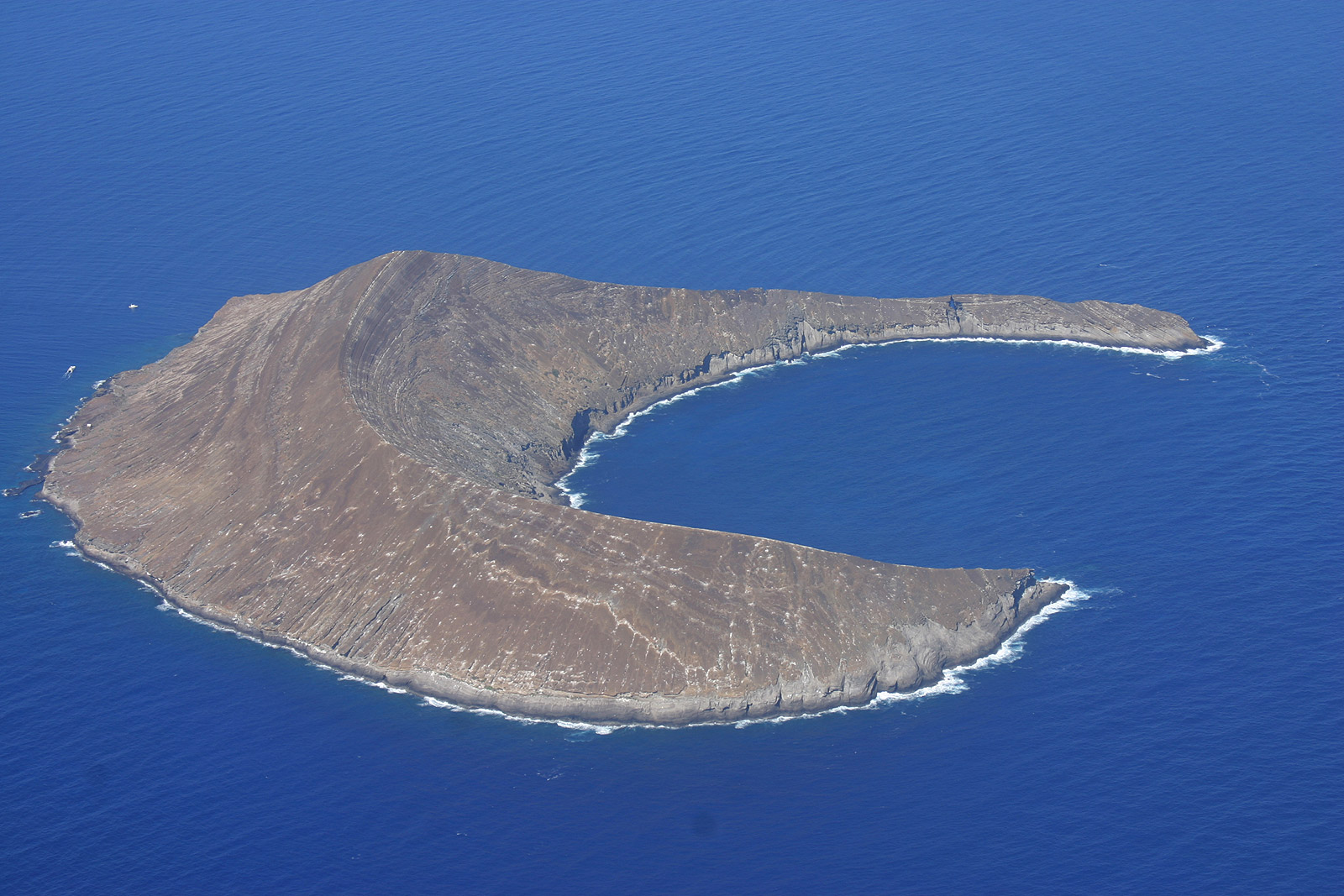
2007 aerial view of Lehua

Location of Lehua Island (dot at left) in relation to Niʻihau and Kauaʻi, in the Hawaiian Islands.

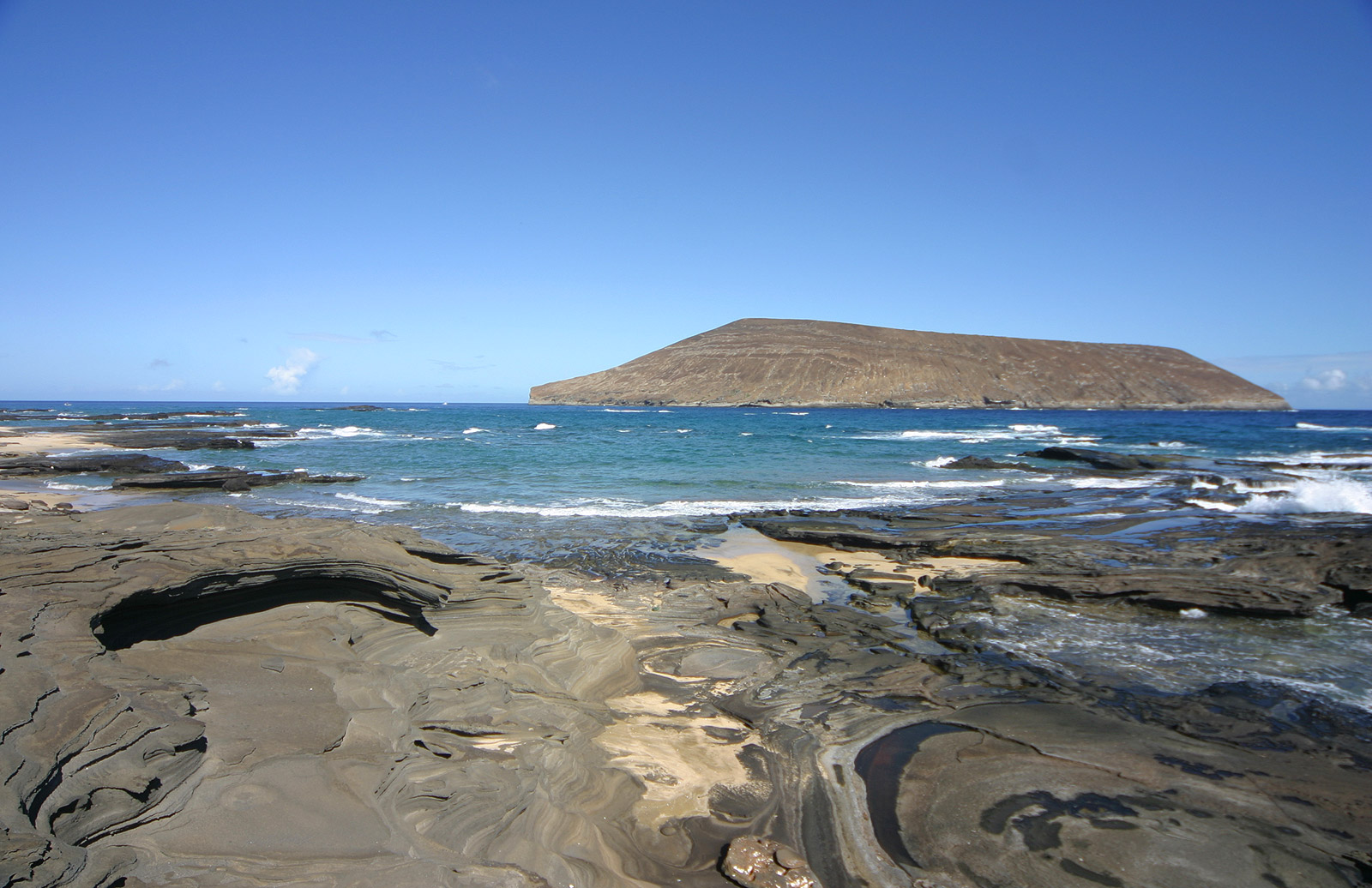
View of Lehua from the north shore of Niʻihau

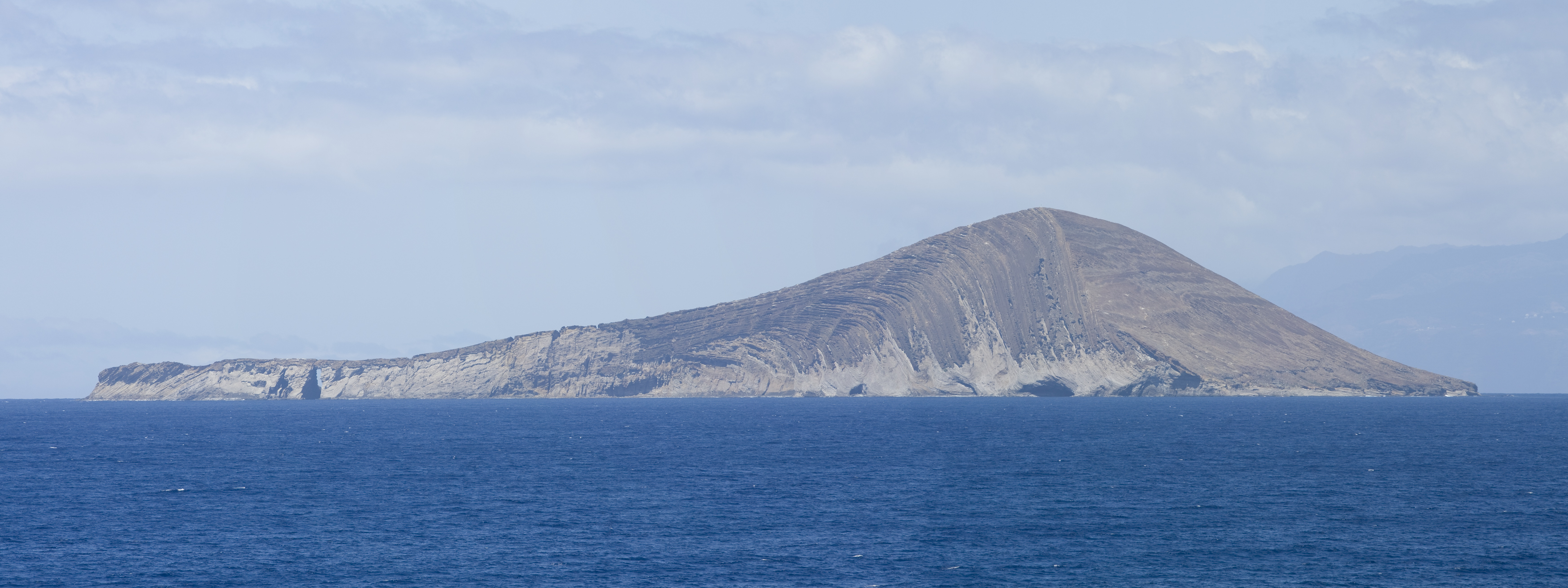
View of Lehua looking East

Lehua Island is a small, crescent-shaped island in the Hawaiian Islands, 0.7 miles (1.1 km) north of Niʻihau, 18 miles due west of Kauaʻi. This uninhabited, 285-acre (1.15 km^{2}) barren islet was one of the first five islands sighted by Captain James Cook in 1778 which he spelled as "Oreehoua".

Lehua Island is a Hawaii State Wildlife Sanctuary. As a restricted sanctuary, all activities are prohibited on the island without a permit. Public access to the island is restricted to areas below the high tide water mark. Lehua provides habitat for at least 16 species of seabirds. A population of European rabbits had lived on the island for many years but were removed in 2005. Polynesian rats, first documented on the island in the 1930s, were declared eradicated in 2021.

When weather and wave conditions permit crossings from Kauaʻi, Lehua is a noted destination for snorkeling and scuba diving. It is also well known for an unusual geological formation dubbed "the keyhole". Located in one of the crescent's narrow arms, this is a tall, thin notch cut from one side, all the way through to the other side of the arm.

The United States Coast Guard maintains Lehua Rock Light (a lighthouse) on Kaunuakalā, at 704 feet (215 m) the highest point of the island.

== Conservation and restoration ==
Lehua is one of the largest and most diverse seabird colonies in the main Hawaiian Islands with 17 seabird species and 25 native plants (14 of them Hawaiʻi endemics, occurring nowhere else in the world) inhabiting the steep, rocky, windswept slopes of the tiny island. Lehua is an important part of native Hawaiian culture; the Niʻihau community gathers ʻopihi (limpets) in adjacent marine waters and on the island are several important native Hawaiian cultural sites.

Invasive rats were foraging on native plants and seeds, which imperiled the entire ecosystem. These impacts contributed to erosion which can in turn impair near-shore marine and coral ecosystems and fisheries. Native birds, like the threatened Newell's Shearwater, were likely being restricted from breeding on Lehua Island due to predation by rats. Smaller, open-nesting seabirds such as terns and noddies were conspicuously absent from Lehua (save small numbers found in sea caves), also a suspected artifact of rat predation. Invasive rats ravaged other threatened birds.

In August 2017, the DLNR Division of Forestry and Wildlife (DOFAW), with project implementation partner Island Conservation, implemented an aerial application of bait with supplemental hand application to eradicate non-native invasive rats. Signs of seabird revival were found post-eradication. The official Final Monitoring Report Issued on Lehua Restoration Project found no rodenticide in environmental samples and minimal impact to species other than rats.

== See also ==
- Desert island
- List of islands
