= Goat Island (Hawaii) =

Island in Hawaii, United States of America

Native name: Mokuʻauia
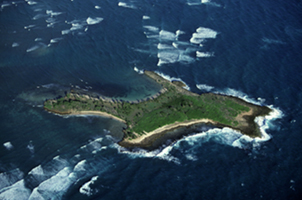
- Aerial view of Goat Island
- Interactive map of Goat Island

Geography
- Location: Oahu, Hawaii
- Coordinates: 21.6618985°N 157.9244453°W
- Area: 13 acres (5.3 ha)
- Highest elevation: 15 ft (4.6 m)

Administration
- United States

Goat Island, also known as Mokuʻauia, is a flat islet consisting of lithified dunes in Laie Bay on the northeast shore of Oahu, Hawaii. It is a small 13 acres (5.3 ha) uninhabited islet, which primarily serves as a seabird sanctuary and a popular recreational site accessible at low tide. The terrain consists of nesting burrows of sea birds such as wedge-tailed shearwaters, surrounded by shallow beaches.

== Geography ==
Goat Island is a small 13 acres (5.3 ha) uninhabited islet consisting of lithified dunes in Laie Bay on the northeast shore of Oahu, Hawaii. The islet is 13 acres (0.053 km^{2}) in area with a maximum elevation of 15 feet (4.6 m). It is located roughly 200 m (660 ft) off the shoreline of Malaekahana State Recreation Area in Honolulu County, and is separated from Malaekahana State Recreation Area by a 720 feet (220 m) channel of limestone reef shelf 1 metre (3.3 ft) underwater.

== Culture and economy ==
Local Moʻolelo legend tells of demigods and a geologic past, with Mokuʻauia associated with ancient Hawaiian mythology as an islet formed from dragon remains. While there is no commercial economy, the island attracts people for eco‑tourism activities such as swimming, snorkeling, tidepool exploration and bird watching. While the inner dunes of the islet are a designated part of the sanctuary, its three beaches remain accessible to the public and attract tourism annually.

== Wildlife and conservation ==
Goat Island is home to 16 native plant species, including the federally endangered Sesbania tomentosa. It is a nesting ground for various sea birds including wedge-tailed shearwaters. The islet is a declared Hawaii State Seabird Sanctuary. The islet contains invasive species, including black rats, fire ants, and big headed ants. Conservation efforts focus on predator control, notably black rat eradication to boost native seabird reproduction. Black rats were first documented on the islet in 1967 with multiple eradication attempts in the 1990s and 2000s. The elimination of the rats resulted in increased wedge-tailed shearwater reproduction.
