= French Frigate Shoals Airport =

Airport in Hawaii, United States

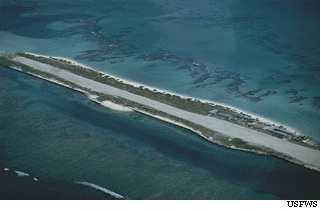
- USFWS aerial image
- IATA: none; ICAO: PHHF; FAA LID: HFS

Summary
- Airport type: Private
- Owner: U.S. Fish and Wildlife Service
- Serves: Tern Island (Hawaii)
- Elevation AMSL: 6 ft (1.8 m)
- Coordinates: 23°52′11″N 166°17′05″W

Map
- Location within Hawaiian Islands

Runways
Direction	Length		Surface
Direction	ft	m	Surface
06/24	3,000	914	Coral
- Source: Federal Aviation Administration

French Frigate Shoals Airport (ICAO: PHHF, FAA LID: HFS) is a private use airport on Tern Island in French Frigate Shoals, a coral atoll, in Hawaii, United States. It is owned by the United States Fish and Wildlife Service, as part of the Hawaiian Islands National Wildlife Refuge.

Although many U.S. airports use the same three-letter location identifier for the FAA and IATA, this airport is assigned HFS by the FAA but has no designation from the IATA (which assigned HFS to Hagfors Airport in Hagfors, Sweden).

The airfield was completed in 1943 by the Seabees from the Naval Base Hawaii, and used from that time into the 21st century supporting a wide variety of activities at the French Frigate shoals. During World War II the airstrip provided an emergency landing for various aircraft, including a twin-engine transport aircraft that was close to ditching in the ocean with over 30 passengers but was able to land safely at the airport.

Before it was constructed in WWII, only seaplanes landed at the French Frigate shoals lagoons, or it had to be visited by boat. The runway is no longer maintained after the NFWS left Tern island in 2012, and there is danger to collide with birds due to large amount of birds in French Frigate Shoals. It's only available for emergencies or with prior permission from the United States government.

== Facilities ==
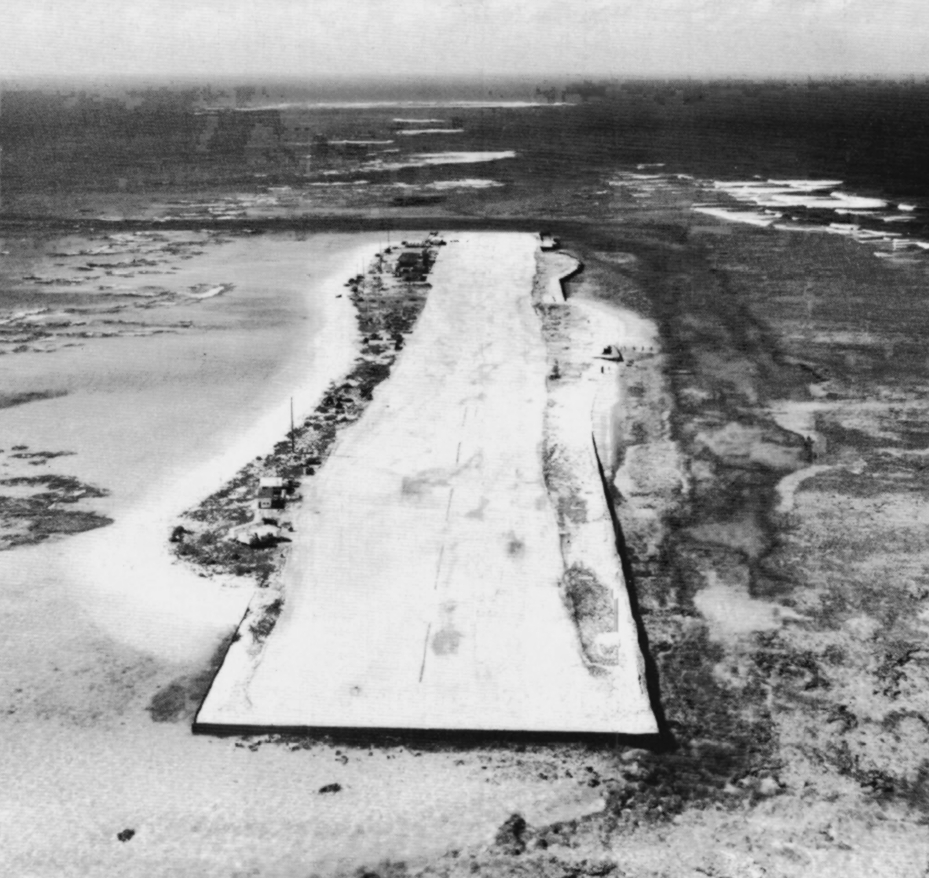
FFS Airfield in 1966

French Frigate Shoals Airport has one runway designated 06/24 with a coral surface measuring 3,000 by 200 feet (914 x 61 m) at an elevation of six feet (2 m) above mean sea level. The runway is closed, except for emergencies, or with prior permission from the United States Fish and Wildlife Service.

During World War II, the facilities included a barracks, radar tower, and fuel tanks as well as others buildings to support operations there. The station had parking spaces for 18-22 small aircraft at that time, and was a refueling stop between Midway and Hawaii.

== History ==
The Seabees in 1942 constructed the airfield. They built a 3,100-foot (940 m) x 275-foot (84 m) runway and a ramp area sufficient for 24 single-engine aircraft, dredging coral to expand the island. Of the 27-acre (11 ha) area of the expanded island, the airfield took up 20 acres (8.1 ha). The Navy designated this airfield as Naval Air Facility French Frigate Shoals, an auxiliary of Naval Station Pearl Harbor. The 1946 Aleutian Islands earthquake generated a tsunami that swept clean Tern Island, and the Navy closed the naval air facility.

During WW2 reconnaissance flights were flown from the base each day.

In 1944, a Curtis Commando with over 30 Marines lost one engine, and had to conduct an emergency landing at the airfield. The aircraft was losing altitude with one engine out, and was down to an altitude of about 200 feet when it was near.

In 1952, the United States Coast Guard built a Long Range Navigation (LORAN) beacon tower on the island alongside a 20-man supporting facility. The Coast Guard used the airfield for a weekly mail-and-supply flight. The Coast Guard installation continued in operation until 1979.

After WW2 until the 1960s it was also used for flights for commercial fishing.

In 2009 the islands were evacuated during the approach of Hurricane Neki by landing a USCG C-130 on Tern's coral airstrip.

In 2010 there were 11 flights to the French Frigate Shoals airstrip.

In 2012 a typhoon struck the French Frigate Shoals. The NFWS facilities were damaged, and the permanent field station was closed down, leaving the airstrip to the elements.

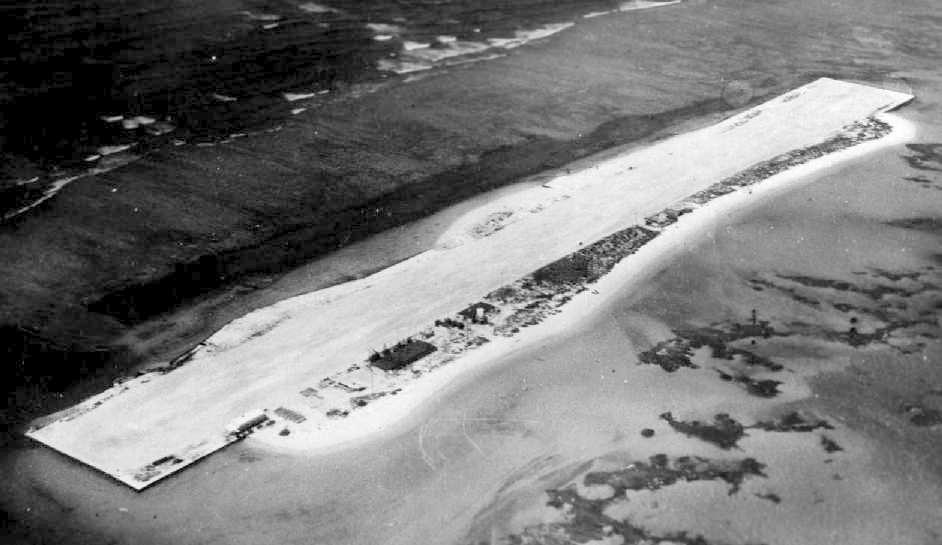
The airfield in 1961

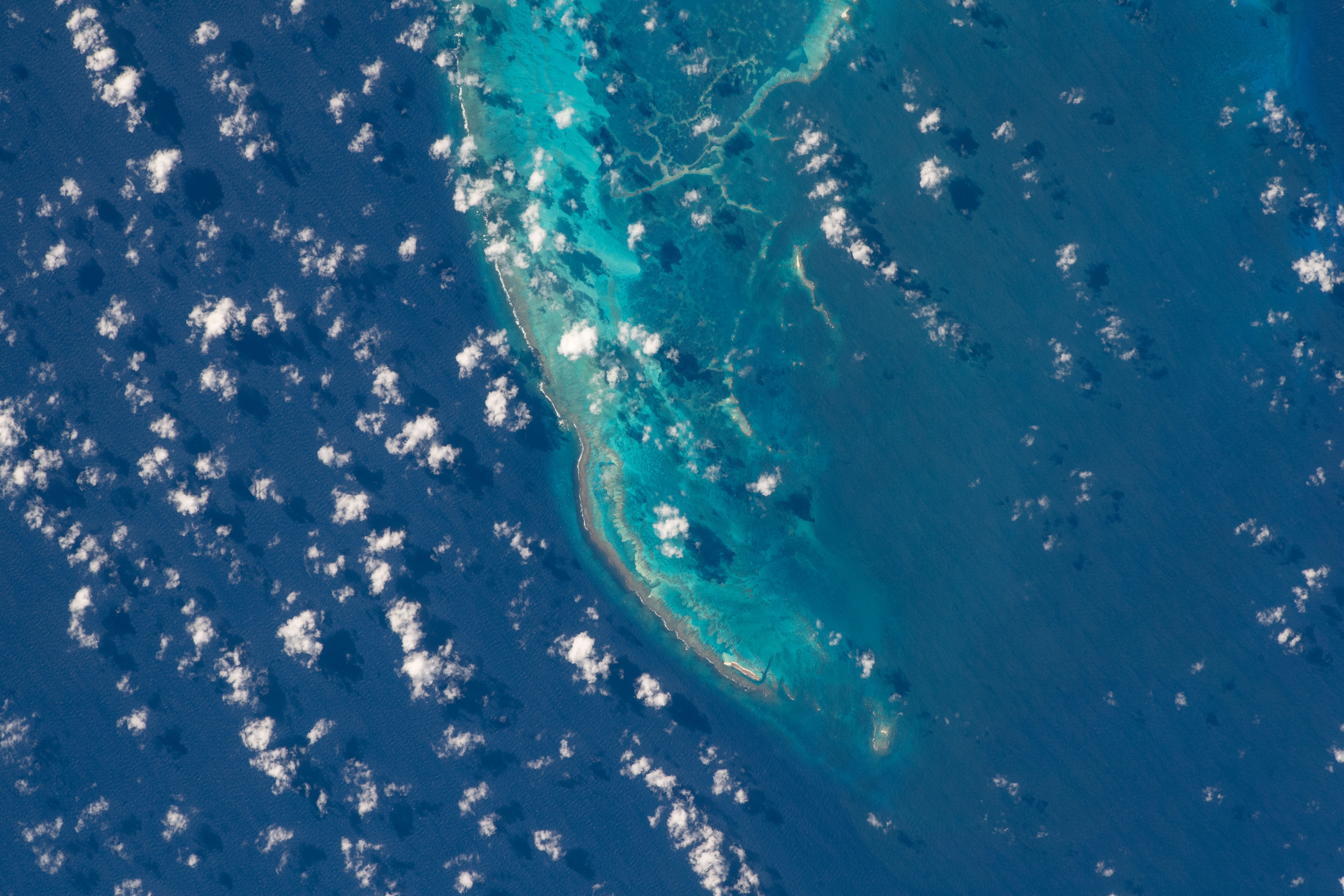
Panned-out view of the shoals, with the airfield in the lower part of the photo. Taken from the International Space Station on July 4, 2022.

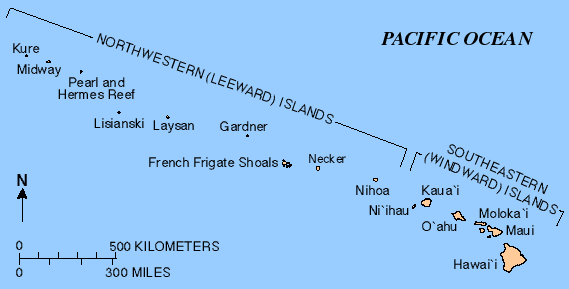
Map showing the location of French Frigate Shoals in the Hawaiian island chain

== List of aircraft that utilized Tern (WW2) ==
Many aircraft had to land at the airstrip during WW2 such a need for fuel, mechanical issues, or bad weather. Types of aircraft that landed at the base during the war include:

- SBD
- F4F
- F6F
- PBY-5A
- R5O
- R4C
- R4D
- PV-1
- B-25
