= East Island (Hawaii) =

Mostly eroded island of Hawaii

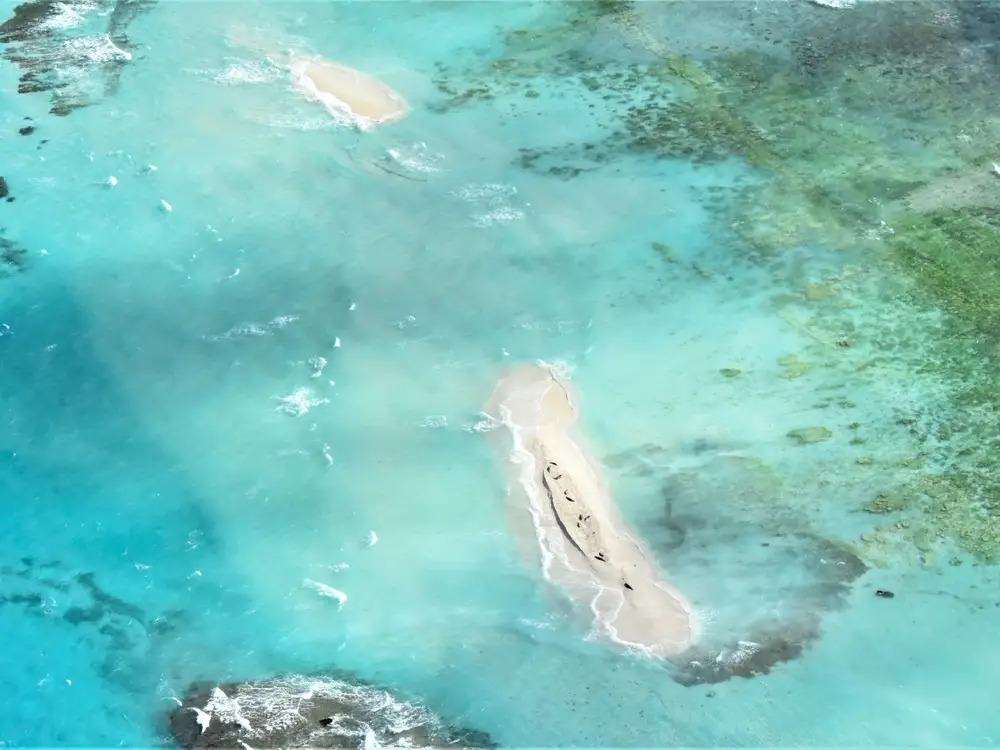
- East Island in October 2018 following Hurricane Walaka

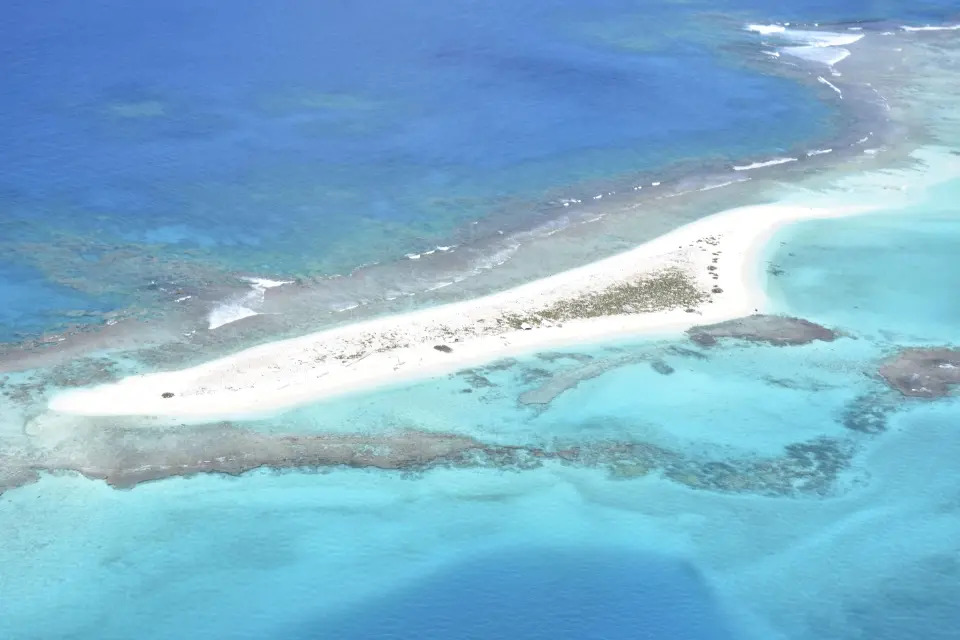
- East Island in May of 2018, prior to its destruction

- Location within Pacific Ocean

Geography
- Location: Pacific Ocean
- Coordinates: 23°47′14″N 166°12′35″W
- Archipelago: French Frigate Shoals
- Adjacent to: Pacific Ocean
- Area: 11 acres (4.5 ha) (Note: This dimension is prior to East Island's erosion in 2018.)
- Length: 0.5 mi (0.8 km)
- Width: 400 ft (120 m)
- Highest elevation: 10 ft (3 m)
- Country: United States
- State: Hawaii
- County: Honolulu County (Note: The Northwestern Hawaiian Islands, excluding Midway Atoll, are administered by Honolulu County.)

Demographics
- Population: 0 (since 1952)

East Island is a low-lying, uninhabited island located within the French Frigate Shoals, a crescent-shaped atoll in the Northwestern Hawaiian Islands. Situated approximately 550 miles (890 km) northwest of Honolulu, the island is composed primarily of sand and gravel and is part of the Papahānaumokuākea Marine National Monument. Once measuring about one-half mile (800 m) in length and 400 feet (120 m) in width, it covered an area of roughly 11 acres (45,000 m^{2}) before much of it was washed away by Hurricane Walaka in 2018. Despite this loss, a reduced form of the island remains and continues to serve an important ecological function as one of the principal nesting sites in Hawaii for the green sea turtle, supporting over half of all nests within the French Frigate Shoals, and as a pupping and haul-out site for the endangered Hawaiian monk seal. It also provides habitat for multiple ground-nesting seabird species, including albatrosses, shearwaters, and terns.

The island has a limited record of human use. It was surveyed during the American Tanager Expedition in the 1920s and was later used intermittently by the United States Navy for aerial reconnaissance and seaplane operations. During World War II, it was selected as the site of a Coast Guard Long-Range Navigation (LORAN) station, a radio-based navigation system used to determine a vessel or aircraft's position. The station operated from 1944 until its decommissioning in 1952. East Island was included in the Hawaiian Islands Bird Reservation in 1909, bringing it under United States federal protection and placing it within the Territory of Hawaii, though it had not been part of the former Kingdom of Hawaii. Since the closure of the LORAN station, the island has remained uninhabited and has been the focus of scientific research and conservation related to its wildlife populations.

In October 2018, East Island was struck directly by Hurricane Walaka, a Category 4 storm that passed over the atoll. The storm surge and wave action caused severe erosion, reducing the island to a narrow sandbar approximately 150 feet (50 m) long. Although initially believed to have been permanently lost, satellite imagery and field observations in subsequent years revealed partial recovery. By 2024, natural sediment transport had restored roughly 60 percent of East Island's former land area, and wildlife, including nesting turtles and monk seals, had begun to reoccupy the site in significant numbers.

== History ==
Although there is no evidence of extensive human activity or permanent settlement on East Island, the surrounding French Frigate Shoals have a documented history of maritime exploration. The islands was first recorded by Europeans in 1786, when French explorer Jean-François de Galaup, comte de Lapérouse, narrowly avoided wrecking his ships on the reefs and subsequently charted part of the southeastern portion. Throughout the 19th century, the shoals became known for maritime hazards. The whaling ship Two Brothers was wrecked near Shark Island, another nearby island within the shoals, in 1823 and several other vessels—including the South Seaman, Modern Times, and Wanderer—were lost on the reefs in 1859.

That year, the United States formally claimed the French Frigate Shoals under the Guano Islands Act. (Note: The Guano Islands Act of 1856 permitted U.S. citizens to take possession of unclaimed islands containing guano deposits, which were valuable as fertilizer.) Lieutenant John M. Brooke of the U.S. Navy took possession of the atoll on 14 January 1859 aboard Fenimore Cooper. Although guano extraction was considered, it was ultimately deemed impractical. East Island, occasionally referred to during this period as "Turtle Island", remained under U.S. jurisdiction and was included in the Hawaiian Islands Bird Reservation in 1909. However, it remained largely unexamined and unoccupied until the early 20th century.

East Island was first surveyed in detail during the Tanager Expedition of 1923 and 1924. The US Navy minesweeper Quail conducted aerial photography of the surrounding shoals in 1932. A temporary encampment was established on the island in 1935 to support naval maneuvers, and in 1936 the US Navy's Wright set up a base to facilitate a month-long series of seaplane operations. During World War II, East Island was selected as the site of a U.S. Coast Guard Long-Range Navigation (LORAN) station. Construction began in July 1944, and the facility operated from November of that year until October 1952. After its military use ended, the island became increasingly important for ecological monitoring and conservation. By the 1980s, East Island was recognized as a pupping site for the endangered Hawaiian monk seal, and by the late 20th century, it had become one of the most significant nesting sites for green sea turtles in the Hawaiian Islands, with over 500 nests recorded in 1997.

=== LORAN station ===
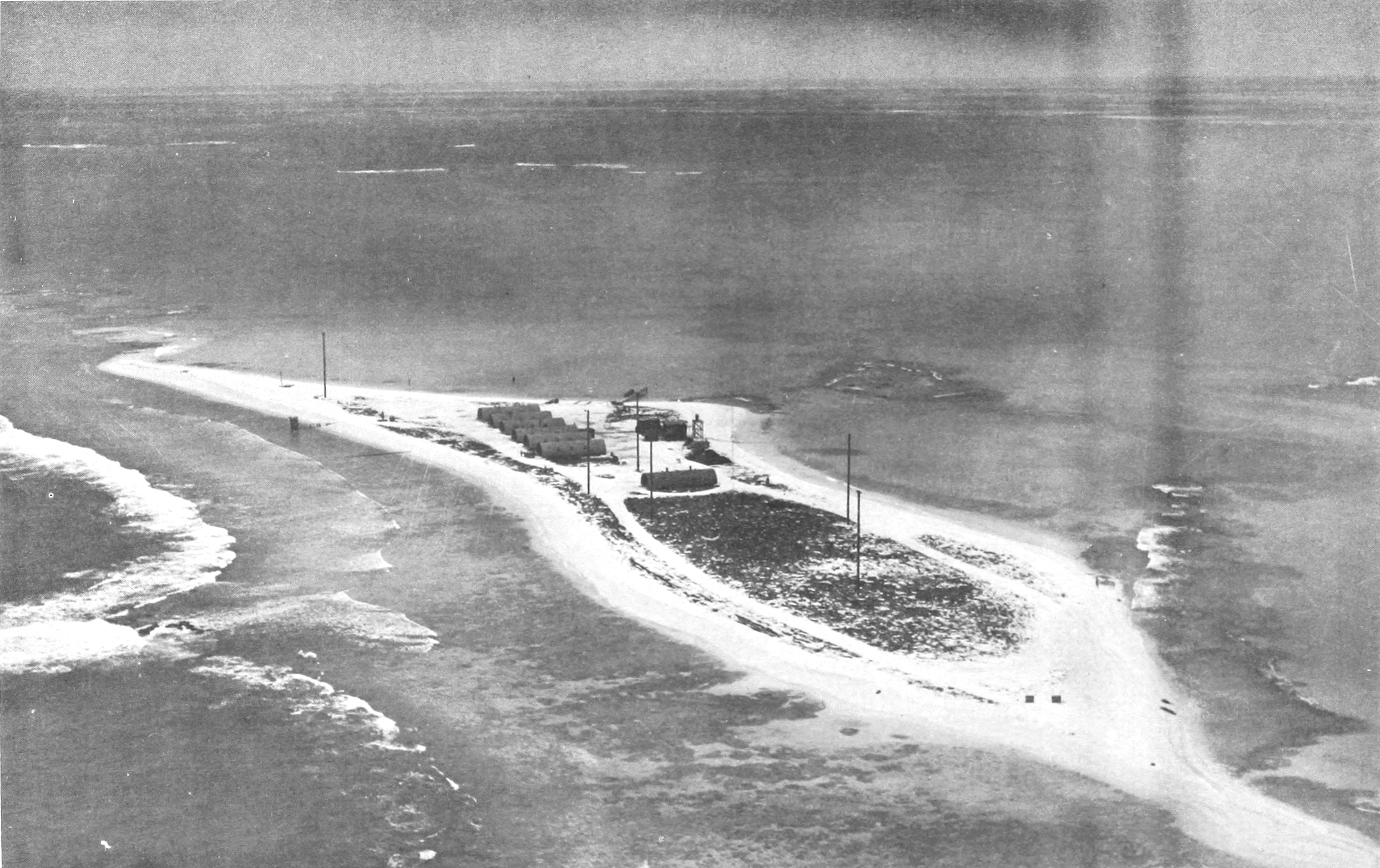
A Coast Guard LORAN base on East Island in 1945

During World War II, East Island was chosen as the site for a U.S. Coast Guard Long-Range Navigation (LORAN) station. Construction began in early July 1944 but was delayed by adverse weather and the need to buoy the approaches due to extensive surrounding shoals. Cargo was ultimately landed using a large enclosed barge towed from Honolulu by a Navy vessel, supplemented by shuttle trips between Tern Island and East Island using LCM craft. By July 2, the water infrastructure was complete, including a 5,000-gallon storage tank and a water distillation system. The next day, work began on erecting a 120-foot vertical radiator antenna constructed from 20-foot steel sections and stabilized with guy wires. By the end of July, all major camp facilities were in place, including the foundations and steel frames for huts, and 85 percent of the LORAN system was installed.

The station became operational in November 1944 and remained active until October 1952. At its completion, the facility consisted of 13 buildings, including barracks, a mess hall, generator and radio huts, water tanks, and a distillation shed. It sustained damage during the April 1946 tsunami and was temporarily evacuated in August 1950 due to a typhoon warning.

=== 2018 hurricane and partial submergence ===
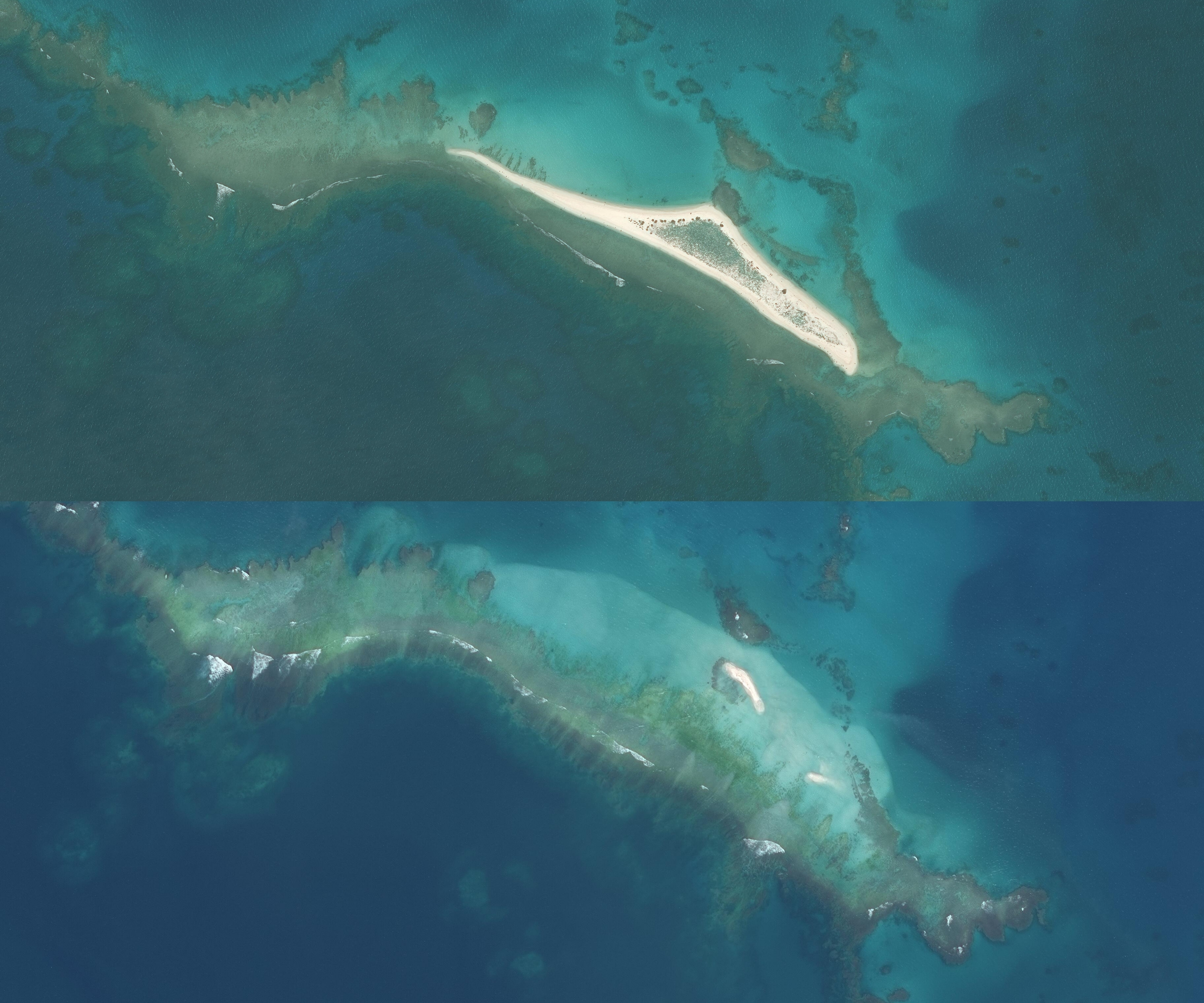
Satellite images of East Island before (May 2018, top) and after (October 2018, bottom) Hurricane Walaka

In early October 2018, East Island was significantly impacted by Hurricane Walaka, a Category 4 storm that passed directly over the French Frigate Shoals. The storm produced a strong surge that caused substantial coastal erosion. As a result, the majority of East Island's landmass was washed away, leaving only a small strip of sand above sea level.

The event was characterized in media reports as the "sinking" or destruction of the island, although the process was primarily one of overwash and sediment displacement rather than complete submersion. Satellite imagery confirmed that the island's pre-existing footprint was almost completely destroyed. The loss of land concerned conservationists due to the island's ecological importance, particularly for nesting green sea turtles and pupping monk seals.

=== Post-storm recovery ===
Following its destruction by Hurricane Walaka in October 2018, researchers observed that parts of the island remained above water and had begun to stabilize by 2023. This allowed limited field access for scientific study, although operations were based from nearby Tern Island due to the reduced land area on East Island itself. In 2024, Honolulu Civil Beat reported East Island had partially reemerged and recovered approximately 60% of its pre-storm land area. Although it remains low-lying and vulnerable to future overwash, its reappearance has been noted by researchers as an indicator of limited natural recovery within a changing climate system. Prior to the storm, East Island had existed for an estimated 2,200 years.

== Geography ==
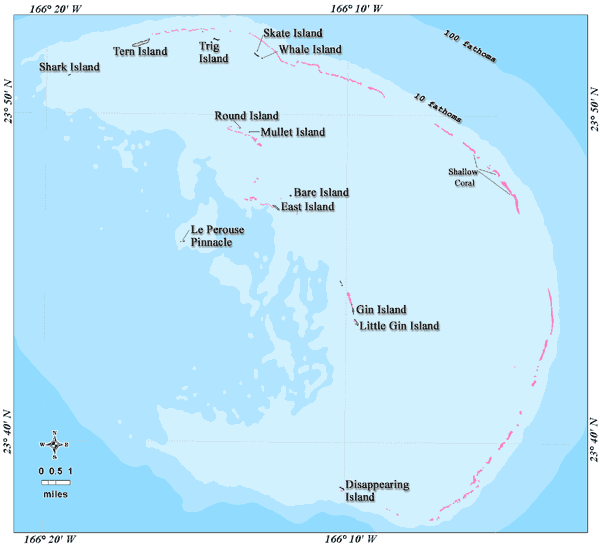
Bathymetric map of French Frigate Shoals, East Island is near the center

East Island is part of the French Frigate Shoals, a crescent-shaped atoll located in the Northwestern Hawaiian Islands, approximately 550 miles (900 km) northwest of Honolulu. Prior to 2018, the island measured about one-half mile (800 m) in length and 400 feet (120 m) in width, covering an area of roughly 11 acres (45,000 m^{2}). Composed primarily of unconsolidated sand and gravel, it rose only a few feet above sea level, making it particularly vulnerable to overwash, erosion, and storm-related degradation.

A 2013 study using satellite imagery and photogrammetric elevation data found East Island had a mean elevation of 7.5 feet (2.3 m) and a maximum elevation of around 10 feet (3.0 m). The island supported sparse vegetation, with less than 1% of its surface covered in shrubs and the remainder divided among vine/ground cover, bare ground, and beach habitat. These low-lying conditions made East Island especially susceptible to climate change impacts, including sea-level rise and increased storm intensity.

== Ecological significance ==
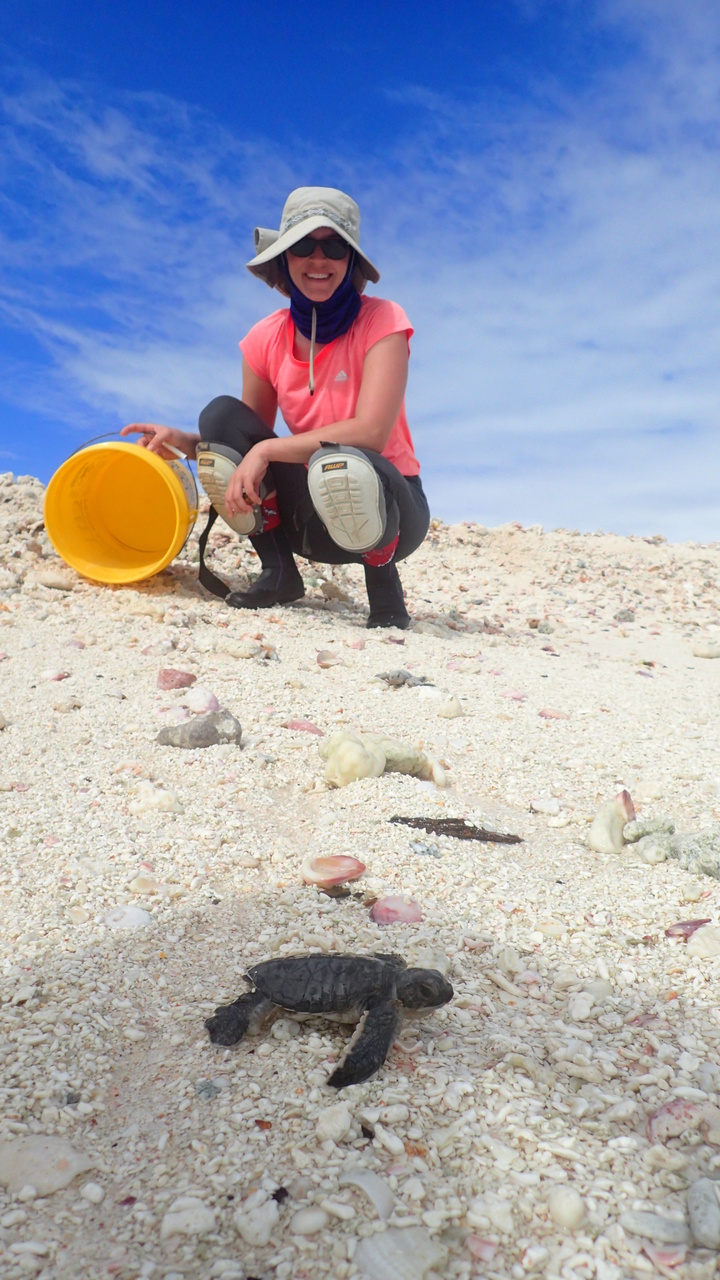
Green sea turtle hatchling crawling to the ocean on East Island, weeks before Hurricane Walaka

East Island and the surrounding islets of French Frigate Shoals supported a diverse and ecologically important array of wildlife, particularly species reliant on terrestrial habitat for critical life stages. Prior to its loss in 2018, the island provided one of the largest areas of nesting habitat in the atoll for ground-nesting seabirds, including several species of albatrosses, shearwaters, and terns. It also served as a key nesting site for Hawaiian green sea turtles (Chelonia mydas), supporting some of the highest annual nesting densities in the region. In addition, East Island and nearby islets were vital to the endangered Hawaiian monk seal (Neomonachus schauinslandi), providing pupping and resting areas for what was once the species' largest subpopulation. The loss of East Island due to Hurricane Walaka significantly reduced the available habitat for these species, resulting in measurable impacts on nesting success, pup survival, and long-term population viability.

Prior to its loss in 2018, East Island had a relatively high mean elevation of approximately 7.5 feet (2.3 m) above mean high water and was projected to experience only limited habitat loss under sea-level rise scenarios. A projected rise of 6.5 feet (2.0 m) was expected to result in a reduction of just 3.6 percent of the island's total land area, mostly affecting beach zones. However, these projections were overtaken by the effects of Hurricane Walaka, which eroded most of the island, resulting in extensive habitat loss far beyond earlier expectations.

Following the 2018 destruction of most of East Island by Hurricane Walaka, researchers expressed uncertainty about how wildlife would respond to the loss of habitat. According to National Oceanic and Atmospheric Administration (NOAA) scientist Charles Littnan, green sea turtles may attempt to nest on other nearby islands in subsequent seasons. However, there remains the possibility that East Island could gradually reaccumulate sand and partially reform. In satellite imagery taken after the storm, some Hawaiian monk seals were already observed hauling out on the remaining 150-foot stretch of sand, suggesting that wildlife may begin to reoccupy the site despite its diminished size.

=== Hawaiian monk seals ===
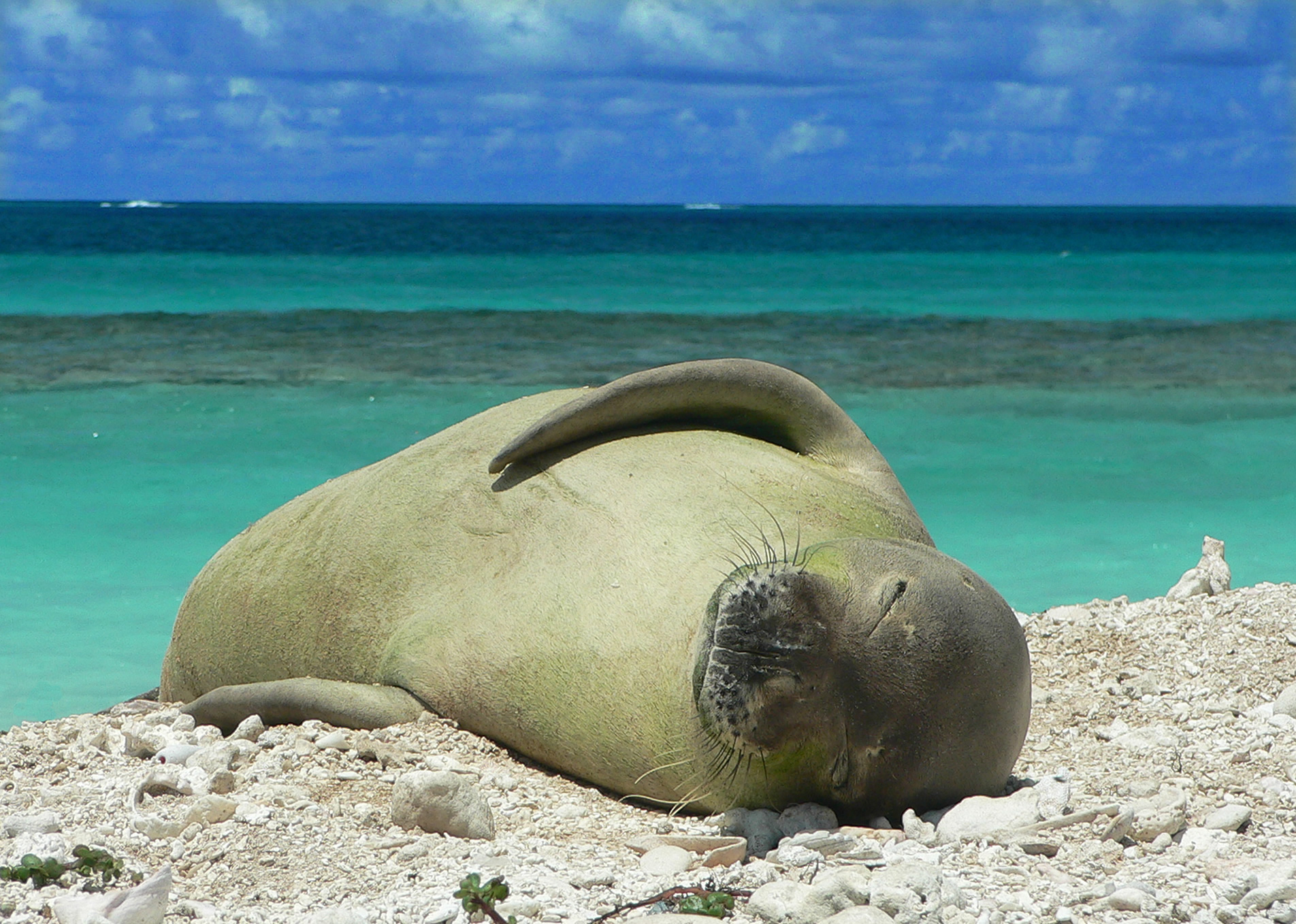
Hawaiian monk seal rests on East Island

East Island and other islets within the French Frigate Shoals support a significant portion of the Hawaiian monk seal (Neomonachus schauinslandi) population, with the atoll once hosting the largest subpopulation in the Northwestern Hawaiian Islands (NWHI). Monk seals depend on a terrestrial habitat for resting, parturition and nursing, and East Island was among the most frequently used pupping sites due to its sandy terrain and proximity to shallow and protected waters. Alongside Trig Island, it served as a primary birth location until both were lost in 2018. The disappearance of these islets contributed to a marked decline in pup survival. Whereas seal pups at other NWHI sites typically experience a survival rate of around 95 percent from birth to weaning, the rate at French Frigate Shoals dropped to 57 percent in 2018. This decline has been attributed primarily to predation by Galapagos sharks (Carcharhinus galapagensis), which began frequenting the shallows adjacent to eroding islets, and to drowning caused by storm-driven inundation of low-lying birth sites.

After the loss of East and Trig Islands, Tern Island became the primary land habitat for Hawaiian monk seals, providing about three-quarters of the atoll's remaining terrestrial area as of 2019. Its higher elevation and hardened shoreline offer some protection from rising seas, but decaying human infrastructure has caused repeated seal entrapments, leaving its long-term suitability uncertain without restoration.

=== Green sea turtles ===
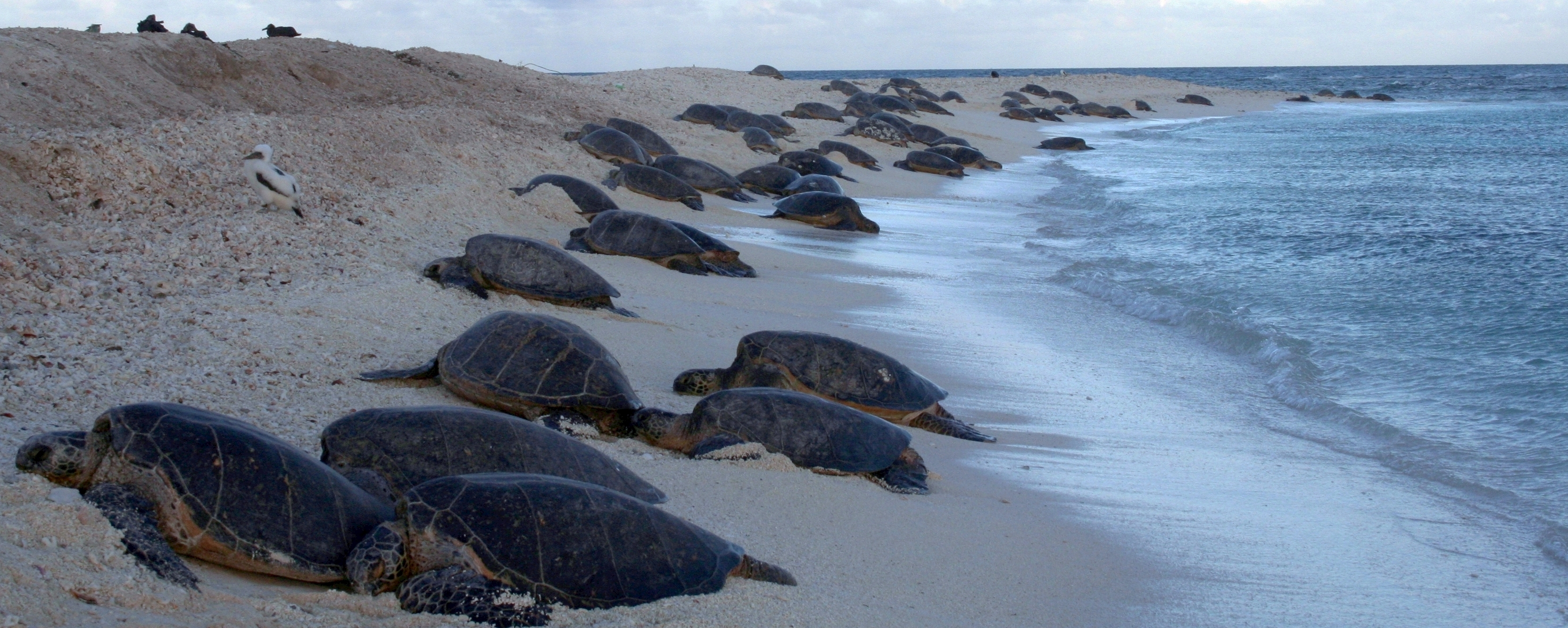
Green sea turtles at French Frigate Shoals within Hawaiian Islands National Wildlife Refuge

Historically, East Island has been one of the most important nesting sites for the Hawaiian population of green sea turtles (Chelonia mydas), a species listed as threatened under the U.S. Endangered Species Act. Approximately 96 percent of Hawaii's green turtle nesting activity occurs within French Frigate Shoals, with East Island alone supporting more than half of all recorded nests in the atoll. Nesting typically takes place between May and September, and females exhibit strong site fidelity, (Note: Site fidelity refers to the behavioral tendency of an organism to return to the same location to breed or nest across multiple seasons.) often returning to the same beach across multiple reproductive seasons. Beginning in the 1970s, East Island became the focal point of long-term turtle monitoring programs, including annual saturation tagging surveys conducted by NOAA and its partner agencies.

Following the implementation of conservation and legal protections, the nesting population at East Island experienced a significant increase. From the 1970s to the 2000s, the number of nesting females rose at an average annual rate of 5.7 percent. By the early 2000s, the island hosted a mean of approximately 390 nesting females per year. Nonetheless, this represented only a small fraction of the island's theoretical carrying capacity. A 2010 study estimated that East Island could potentially support between 20,000 and 30,000 nesting females annually, with the ability to produce up to 2.1 million hatchlings per season under favorable conditions. The observed activity during the study period corresponded to just 1.3 to 2 percent of this amount. While density-dependent interference—such as nest destruction caused by females digging into existing nests—was not a major limiting factor at the time, it was identified as a possible concern under higher-density conditions.

Green turtles nesting at East Island are part of a genetically distinct Hawaiian stock. Tagging and satellite tracking studies have confirmed long-distance migratory links between French Frigate Shoals and foraging grounds across the main Hawaiian Islands, as well as rare movements to other parts of the Northwestern Hawaiian Islands and Johnston Atoll. Over 5,800 individual turtles have been recorded at East Island since 1973, and females have been observed to nest intermittently across decades, with some individuals returning for over 29 years. Despite the increasing abundance of nesters and evidence of recovery, fluctuations in annual nesting numbers have persisted, often corresponding to ocean-climate variability and environmental conditions. Following the destruction of East Island by Hurricane Walaka in 2018, researchers observed a sharp reduction in suitable nesting habitat.

=== Seabirds ===
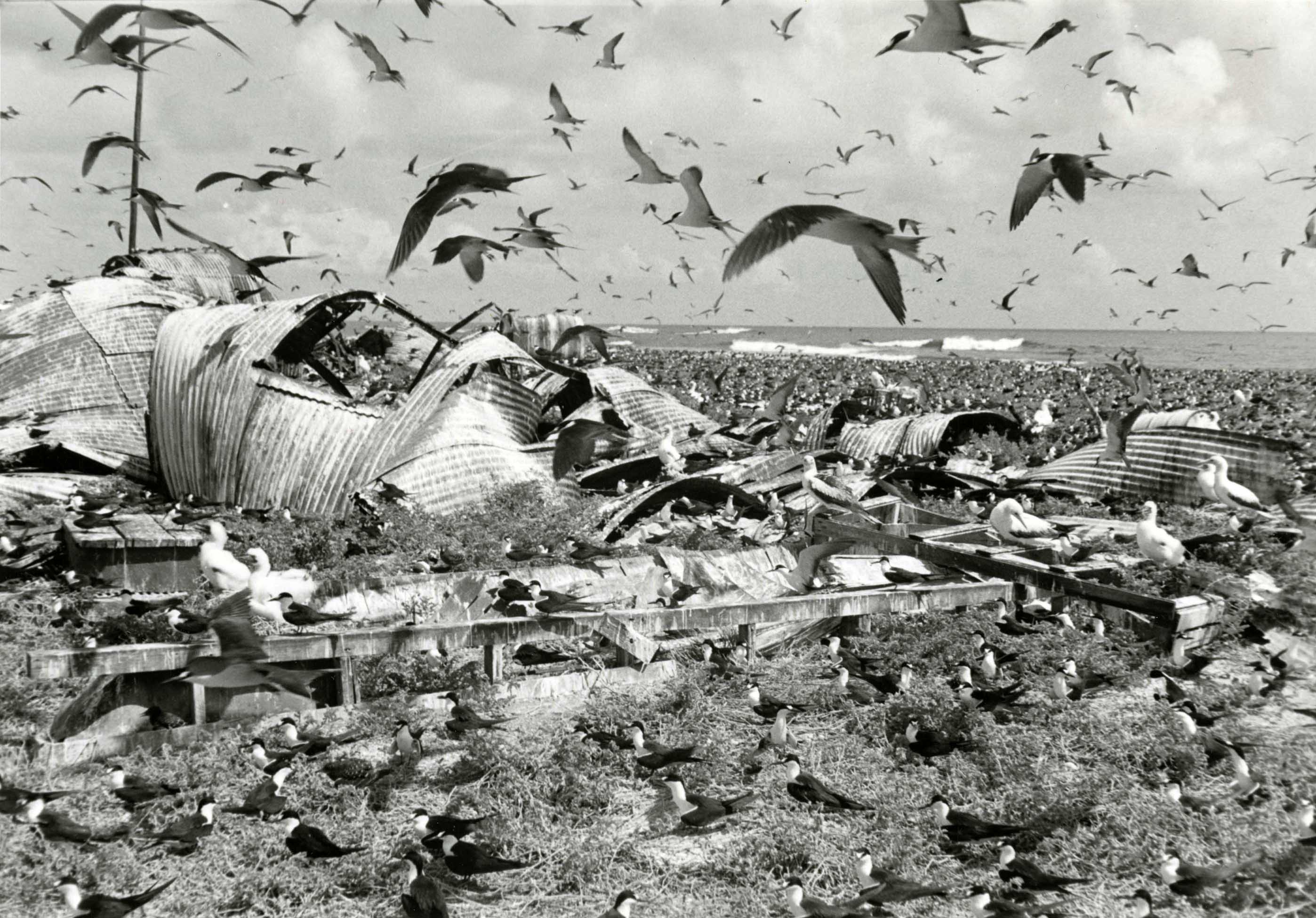
Sooty terns and red-footed boobies nesting among building ruins on East Island, June 1966

East Island supported significant seabird nesting activity and provided one of the largest areas of seabird habitat within the French Frigate Shoals. In 2010, the island contained approximately 5.2 acres (2.1 ha) of nesting habitat, consisting primarily of bare ground and vine or ground cover, with little to no shrub vegetation. This open terrain was suitable for a variety of ground-nesting seabird species, including the black-footed albatross (Phoebastria nigripes), Laysan albatross (Phoebastria immutabilis), wedge-tailed shearwater (Ardenna pacifica), Tristram's storm-petrel (Hydrobates tristrami), masked booby (Sula dactylatra), gray-backed tern (Onychoprion lunatus), and brown noddy (Anous stolidus). Seabird chicks were vulnerable to predation by tiger sharks (Galeocerdo cuvier), which frequently patrolled the surrounding waters. Chicks that entered the surf or fell into the ocean during fledging were at particular risk.

Among the species nesting on East Island, Tristram's storm-petrel was of particular ecological interest. In 2005, approximately 160 breeding pairs were recorded on the island. These birds nested in earthen burrows sparsely distributed across the terrain, with an average burrow density of about 0.028 m² per nest. However, breeding success was limited. Hatching success was 54 percent, and fledging success did not exceed 40 percent, yielding an overall reproductive success rate of less than 22 percent. Several factors contributed to this outcome, including burrow collapse caused by unstable soils, interspecific competition with wedge-tailed shearwaters and Bonin petrels (Pterodroma hypoleuca)—both of which were known to annex storm-petrel burrows—and environmental stressors such as heavy rainfall and wind exposure. Mortality may also have been influenced by invasive arthropods, including ants and flies.

=== Algaes ===
The waters surrounding East Island, as part of the broader French Frigate Shoals, support a diverse and predominantly native assemblage of marine algae. Surveys conducted between 1990 and 2002 identified 157 species of algae within the atoll, including macroalgae, epiphytes, and turf-forming species. Of these, 74% were newly recorded for the area, and four species—Bryopsis indica, Gracilaria millardetii, Halimeda distorta, and an unidentified Laurencia—were reported for the first time in the Hawaiian Archipelago. Two species, Acrosymphyton brainardii and Scinaia huismanii, were described as new to science and are considered endemic to French Frigate Shoals.

Red algae were the most abundant, followed by green and brown algae, with no invasive alien species documented during surveys. The Cheney ratio, a measure of algal biodiversity, confirmed a tropical flora with minimal temperate influence. The composition and richness of the algal communities are attributed to the geographic isolation of the atoll and the variety of benthic habitats shaped by differing oceanographic conditions. The algal flora of French Frigate Shoals shares high similarity with that of the main Hawaiian Islands, though distinct from other Pacific island groups.

=== Fish ===
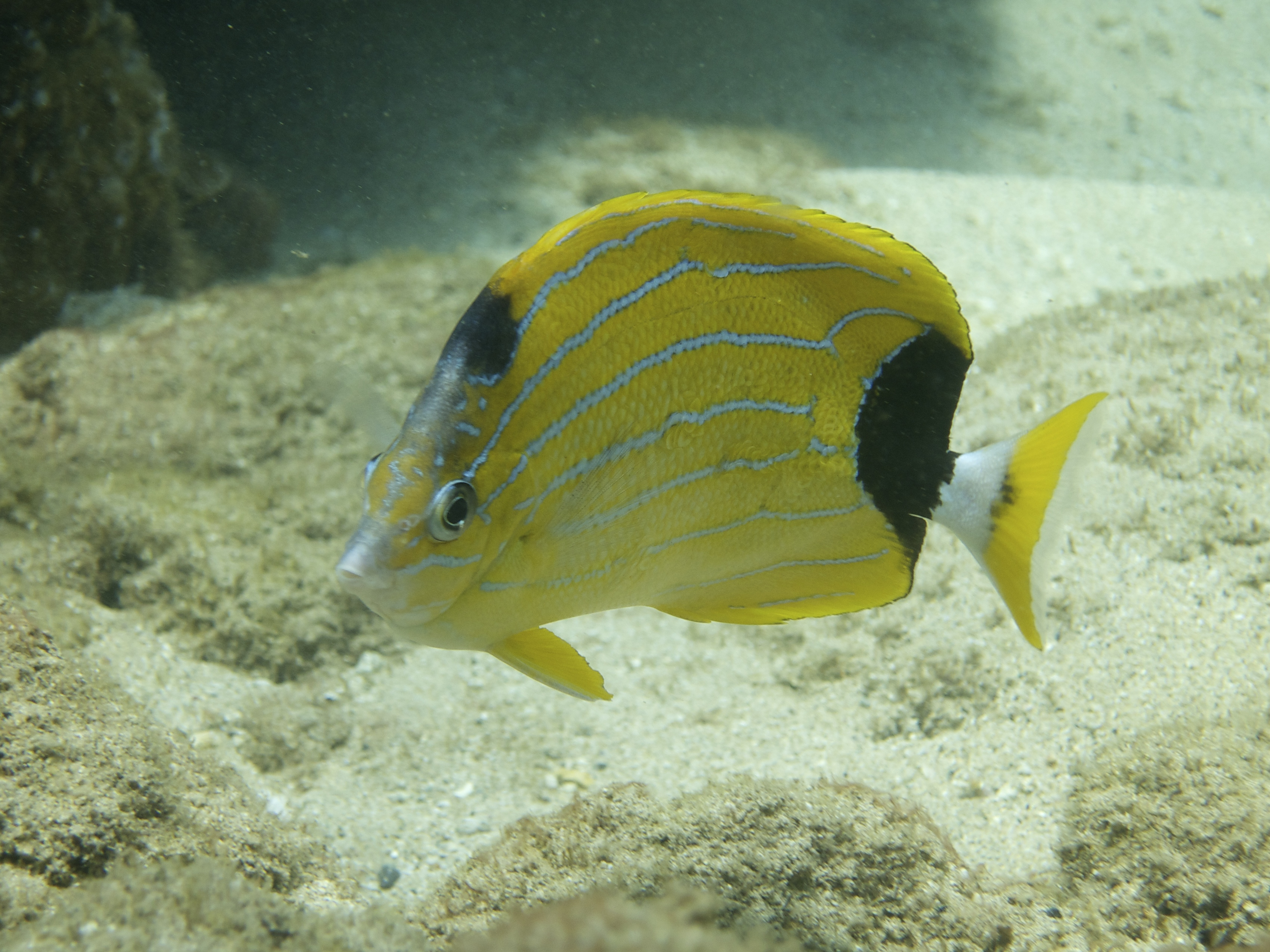
The bluestripe butterflyfish (Chaetodon fremblii) is one of the fish species that live in the French Frigate Shoals.

Surveys at French Frigate Shoals, including waters around East Island, have recorded a diverse reef fish community with many dozens of species. Common species include Pacific gregory (Stegastes fasciolatus), Hawaiian dascyllus (Dascyllus albisella), saddle wrasse (Thalassoma duperrey), pearl wrasse (Cheilinus unifasciatus), Johnston's damselfish (Plectroglyphidodon johnstonianus), and Hawaiian whitespotted toby (Canthigaster jactator). Surgeonfishes such as Acanthurus leucopareius, Acanthurus nigrofuscus, and Ctenochaetus strigosus are also abundant, along with goatfishes including Parupeneus porphyreus and Mulloidichthys vanicolensis. Other taxa present include parrotfishes (Scaridae), cardinalfishes (Apogonidae), squirrelfishes (Neoniphon sammara), and several butterflyfish species such as millet butterflyfish (Chaetodon miliaris), Pebbled butterflyfish (Chaetodon multicinctus), and Bluestripe butterflyfish (Chaetodon fremblii).

==== Sharks ====
The French Frigate Shoals support a shark assemblage dominated by Galapagos (Carcharhinus galapagensis), gray reef (Carcharhinus amblyrhynchos), and tiger sharks (Galeocerdo cuvier). Longline surveys in 2009 recorded seven species, with Galapagos sharks comprising about 36 percent of captures, gray reef sharks 26 percent, and tiger sharks 20 percent. Population estimates indicated several hundred Galapagos sharks inhabit the atoll. Tiger sharks are seasonally associated with East Island, where they prey on fledgling albatross during summer months before dispersing across the Pacific and later returning. Galapagos sharks are more resident within the atoll and frequent both lagoonal and outer reef habitats.
