= Tern Island (Hawaii) =

Small Pacific Ocean island

Nickname: "the coral carrier"
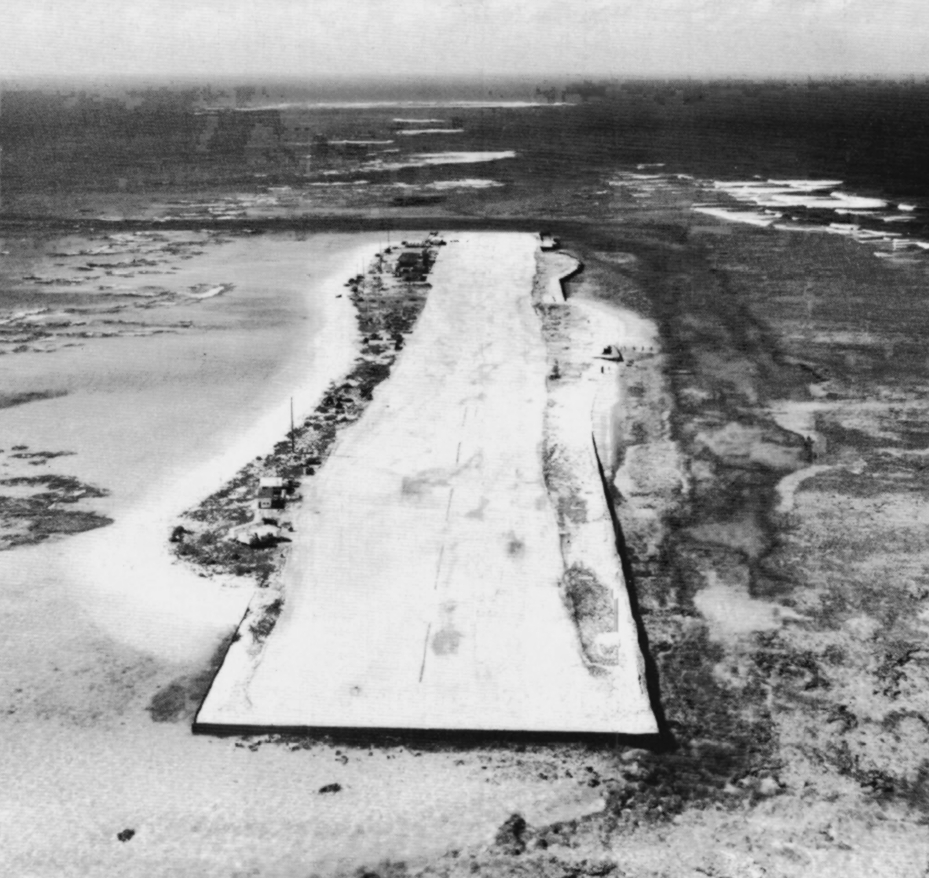
- French Frigate Shoals, 1966
- Interactive map of Tern Island

Geography
- Location: French Frigate Shoals
- Coordinates: 23.870°N 166.284°W
- Area: 26.014 acres (10.527 ha)

Administration
- United States of America

Demographics
- Population: Seasonal (0)

Additional information
- 5000 ft seawall & sand airstrip

Tern Island is a coral island located in the French Frigate Shoals in the Northwestern Hawaiian Islands. It is located within both the Hawaiian Islands National Wildlife Refuge and the Papahānaumokuākea Marine National Monument, and is also a part of the Coral Reef Ecosystem Reserve managed by National Oceanic and Atmospheric Administration (NOAA) & the State of Hawaii's NWHI Marine Refuge. It is approximately 490 miles (790 kilometers) west-northwest of O'ahu, and about halfway between O'ahu and Midway Atoll.

The island provides breeding habitat for 18 species of seabirds, green sea turtles (Chelonia mydas), and Hawaiian monk seals (Neomonachus schauinslandi).

The U.S. Navy enlarged the island to construct a Naval Air Station in 1942, which operated from 1942 to 1946. The island was also used as a U.S. Coast Guard base from 1952 to 1979, and as a Fish and Wildlife Service field station from 1979 to 2012. While the FWS no longer maintains a year-round presence at Tern Island following extensive storm damage to the facilities in 2012, seasonal field teams do still occupy the island regularly, typically in the summer. The island is still visited periodically. The French Frigate Shoals Airport has been unattended since 2010 and is only acceptable for emergency landings.

In 2013, Google collaborated with FWS and National Oceanic and Atmospheric Administration (NOAA) staff to image Tern Island, along with East Island, Laysan, Lisianski Island, and Pearl and Hermes Atoll, for a Google Street View project to allow the islands to be viewed online via Google Maps. The viewer takes a path along much of the length of the airstrip and part of the shore, offers a series of panoramic images from head height.

Some repair work has been done to the thousands of feet of seawall built during WWII, but the significant deterioration still poses risks to wildlife. The seawall, an inactive runway, and some small buildings still remain on the island today.

== History ==
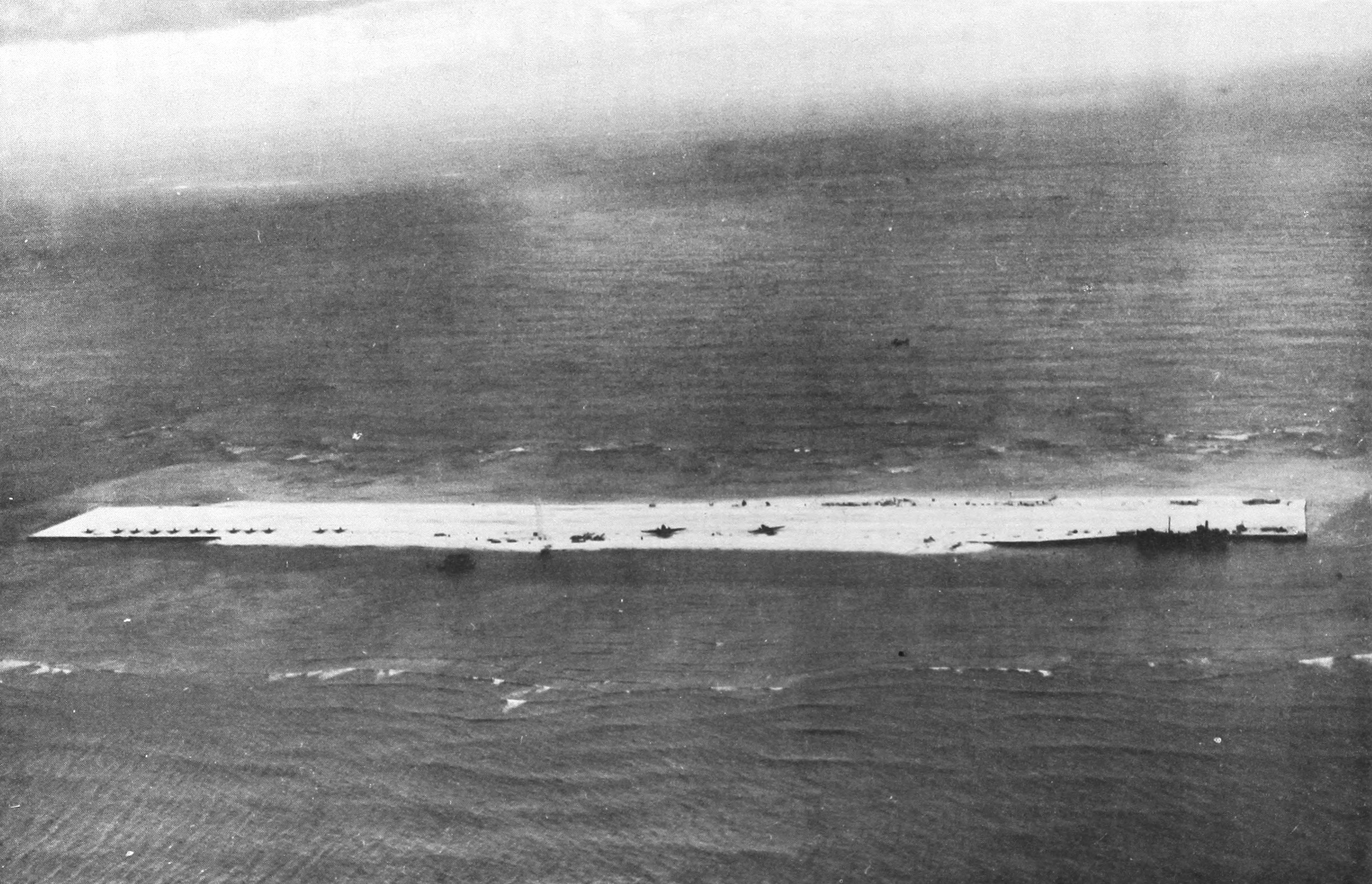
Tern Island in September 1943

Tern Island was first documented by European explorers as a small carbonate sand shoal on November 6, 1786, when the French explorer Jean François de Galaup, comte de Lapérouse recorded it as a small carbonic sand atoll. The original island was described by Alexander Wetmore in June 1923 during the Tanager Expedition as being about 600 yards long by 150 yards wide. The eastern half was a long, curved sandspit 6 to 8 feet (1.8 to 2.4m) above sea level. The western half, where the bird colonies were recorded, was 10 to 12 feet (3 to 3.6m) above sea level and consisted of fine coral sand which supported low vegetation; three out of the estimated 11 acres sported some vegetative cover.

=== Naval Air Station (1942 - 1945) ===
After the 1942 Battle of Midway, the U.S. Navy began work on the construction of a Naval Air Station and refueling stop in the French Frigate Shoals under code Project ME-36. A Navy survey team was dispatched on June 12, 1942 to seek a feasible site for the construction of a land base, and determined that a land base could be constructed on Tern Island. The 5th Seabee Battalion and the Hawaiian Dredging Company began work in August 1942. Tern Island was enlarged from 11 acres to 34 acres via coral dredging to support a 3,100 ft. x 275 ft. (944m x 83m) landing strip, a vessel channel, parking spots for 22 aircraft, and a 5,000 ft. (1,524m) double steel pylon seawall, with walls separated by 4 ft (1.2m). The original seawall used over 5,000 steel pilings. Partially-buried Quonset huts were built to house on-site personnel. Construction was completed in March 1943.

The station was commissioned upon its completion as an auxiliary of Naval Station Pearl Harbor. It provided local surveillance via daily reconnaissance air patrols, and served as an emergency landing site and refueling station for military planes flying between Hawaii and Midway Atoll. The facilities included eight buildings, barracks, a galley, fuel tanks for diesel fuel and aviation gasoline, and a 90-ft. tall radar tower, and by November 1944 they were operated by 123 enlisted men and four officers. Personnel rotated from NS Pearl Harbor on three-month shifts to Tern Island. Base defenses included a battery of 90 mm guns, 3-inch guns, and 30 calibre machine guns.

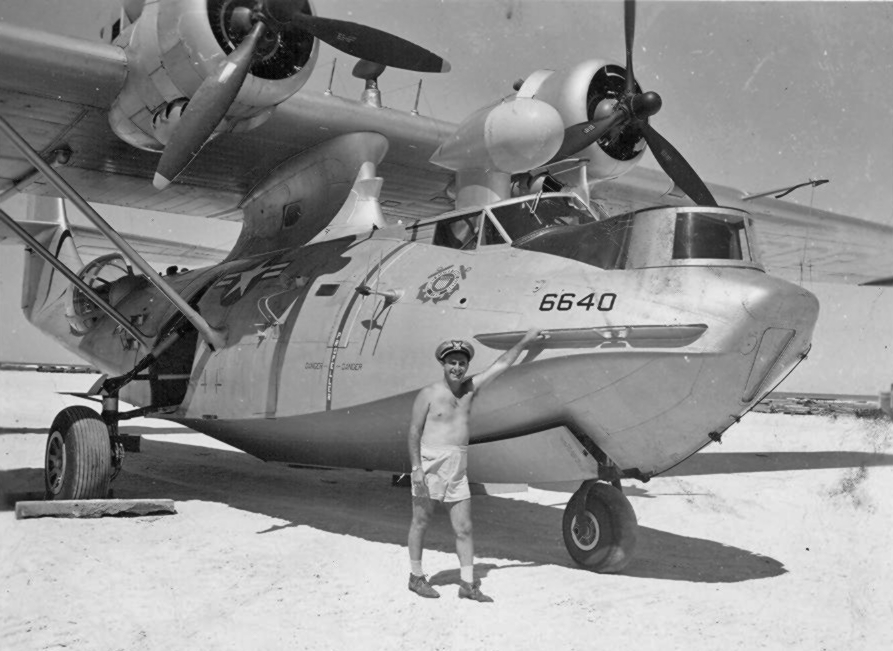
United States Coast Guard PBY-5A at Tern Island in 1953

One emergency landing occurred in 1944, when a Curtiss C-46 Commando with dozens of marines aboard had an engine failure and was close to ditching in the ocean. The twin-engine transport plane was down to an altitude of less than 300 feet, despite having dropped as much weight as possible when it managed to land on Tern Island. The aircraft was able to land with one engine out, avoiding fatalities.

In 1945, Tern Island landed the USMC comedy show All Fouled Up when the entourage's R4D aircraft could not land at Midway Atoll due to fog. The show was performed for the crew there.

In October 1945, following the end of WWII, the Naval Air Station was placed into caretaker status. The military facilities on the island were damaged on April 1, 1946 when a tsunami produced by the 1946 Aleutian Islands earthquake completely inundated the islands of the French Frigate Shoals, including Tern Island. The Naval Air Station was officially decommissioned on June 9, 1946, and the last remaining personnel departed Tern Island.

==== Commercial Fishing Usage ====
Following the decommissioning of the Naval Air Station, the Navy sought in late 1946 to transfer the island's facilities to the Territory of Hawai'i, evidently misunderstanding the jurisdiction of the island - the French Frigate Shoals (including Tern Island) are a federal wildlife reservation, managed by the Fish and Wildlife Service (FWS) and the Department of the Interior (DOI), and the Navy did not own the island. The Territory initially accepted temporary control of the airbase under the condition that it would be able to sublease the field to commercial fishing companies, and Hawai'ian commercial fishermen began using the facilities in June 1946. By September 1946, Hawaiian Tuna Packers, Ltd. had sent a vessel to the French Frigate Shoals and used the airstrip on Tern Island to return two shipments of fish to Honolulu on a DC-3 aircraft. A fishing base was established in November 1946 by commercial fishing companies, with permission having been given by the Territory of Hawai'i for usage of the airstrip.

The continued insistence by Navy that the Territory would be held responsible for maintenance of the facilities resulted in the Hawaiian Aeronautics Commission (HAC) terminating the fishing operation in 1947. The HAC voted in July 1947 to reject the Navy's offer to transfer the Tern Island facilities to the Territory, claiming they did not have capacity to maintain the airfield. The HAC reconsidered the subject of Tern Island's airbase in 1948, expressing interest in assuming control with the intent of making the airstrip & facilities available to the fishing industry.

Throughout the 1950s and into the 1960s, the atoll was fished by several different commercial fishing vessels with varying degrees of success. Commercial fishing companies were permitted by the Territory to use the airstrip to fly their catch back to Honolulu. By the 1960s, the fisheries near Tern Island were overfished and, due to drops in prices, it was no longer profitable for commercial fishermen to fly their catch back using the island's facilities.

=== U.S. Coast Guard LORAN Transmitting Station Tern Island (1952 - 1979) ===
A U.S. Coast Guard station operated on Tern Island from 1952 until 1979. In January 1952, the HAC granted a license to the U.S. Coast Guard allowing use and occupation of Tern Island to construct a LORAN navigation beacon tower and associated facilities. In lieu of pursuing renovations at the East Island LORAN station, the Coast Guard had decided instead to move the station to Tern Island, and construction for this project began in April. The station included power and signal buildings, several transformers and capacitators, an antennae system, fuel and water tanks, a recreational building, and a galley, mess hall, and barracks. On October 14, 1952, U.S. Coast Guard LORAN Transmitting Station Tern Island was placed in commission. The airstrip was used for a weekly mail & supply flight, and there were occasional military plane landings.

Some maintenance on the seawall and other renovations to facilities were conducted by the U.S. Coast Guard while it operated there. Work was done in 1959 to remediate corrosion of steel pilings and repair the northwestern corner of the seawall. In 1964, new sheet piling was installed on the seaward sides of the existing seawall along the east and west edges of the runway, a new LORAN building was constructed, and various repairs to the facilities were also made. In the 1970s, the northwestern corner of the seawall began to fail. The Coast Guard dumped waste to backfill the eroded areas near the failed seawall, creating the PCB-contaminated area later called "Bulky Dump".

A Pacific Missile Range (PMR) portable tracking facility, including electrical switching equipment, generators, and a 50,000-gallon fuel tank, was installed by the Navy on Tern Island and operated by Bendix Radio Company with a staff of 6-10 people from 1960 to 1963. The facility's supplies, equipment, and 33 PMR personnel arrived on the island in early December 1960. By 1961, there were on average five men, including a mess cook, in the PMR complement. The opening of the PMR facility significantly increased the frequency of plane and helicopter landings, ship visits, and the number of personnel on the island. The PMR crew lived on-site in Quonset huts, later moving into two air-conditioned house trailers shipped to the island in 1961 during the Starfish Prime nuclear weapons testing project. The PMR facility on Tern Island tracked both the USAF Discoverer spacecraft and Soviet spacecraft. The PMR facility was closed and the equipment and personnel removed from the island in August 1963.

In 1966, the FWS and DOI questioned the legality of the Coast Guard's occupation and usage of Tern Island. An agreement between the DOI, FWS, and the Coast Guard was reached in 1966, with the Coast Guard being permitted to continue operating the Tern Island LORAN station.

On December 1, 1969, Tern Island was inundated in the early hours of the morning by high water, with waves of over 8 ft. (2.4m) caused by a violent storm approximately 1,500 miles to the northwest sweeping over the island. The island's facilities suffered extensive damage. Power equipment was flooded and it, along with all other electronic equipment on the island, had to be shut down. There was widespread damage to the seawall, and vegetation from the northwest side of the island was almost completely swept away. Significant amounts of sediment were washed away from the LORAN tower, and various other structures were damaged or entirely demolished. The crew escaped the water by climbing to the roof of the LORAN building. An initial attempt at rescue via plane was attempted at noon the same day, but the plane was unable to land and instead air-dropped survival supplies. The crew and three dogs were evacuated on the morning of December 2 by helicopter to the New Zealand frigate HMNZS Waikato, and taken to Midway Atoll, and then to Honolulu. The crew returned on the 12th, the LORAN system was brought back into operation on January 6, 1970, and the station resumed normal operations shortly thereafter in mid-January 1970.

The LORAN station was decommissioned on July 30, 1979, and the Coast Guard returned Tern Island to FWS, who took over management of the island.

=== FWS Field Research Station (1979 - 2012) ===
Following the decommissioning of the LORAN station, FWS operated a field station on Tern Island staffed by between 5 and 15 people. A monthly mail plane brought mail, personnel, and occasionally cargo such as groceries from Honolulu, while heavier cargo or larger field crews came by water. The barracks continued to be used into the 21st century to house Tern Island's residents. Upgrades included the cleanup of old waste, improved water tanks, and a solar panel bank. The solar power generated on the island powered a reverse osmosis desalinator, capable of producing 1,200 gallons of freshwater per day. A diesel generator, which was used only on an as-needed basis, ran off a 500-gallon fuel tank.

The FWS field station allowed for unique, in-depth research to be conducted on seabirds, Hawaiian monk seals, and green sea turtles. NOAA teams have occupied Tern Island for the summer months every year since 1982 for study and observation of Hawaiian monk seal populations in the French Frigate Shoals. Teams often translocate weaned Hawaiian monk seal pups to Tern Island for its relative safety from predation by the Galapagos shark (Carcharhinus galapagensis), with 11 pups translocated in the 2016 season.

A long-term study on reproductive biology of the green sea turtle at Tern Island was carried out from 1986 to 1991, which found hatching success rate at Tern Island to be between 78.6% and 81.1%, with nesting season peaking between mid-June and early August.

The island's small size makes it possible to census the entire population of a given seabird, and in-depth studies were carried out on white terns (Gygis alba), black noddies (Anous minutus), red-tailed tropicbirds (Phaethon rubricauda), red-footed boobies (Sula sula), and masked boobies (Sula dactylatra). Tern Island was also a major bird banding station in the North Pacific, having banded over 2,250 Laysan and black-footed albatrosses in 2002. Field researchers at the Tern Island station also travelled frequently to other islands in the atoll to census and monitor Hawaiian monk seals.

The extensive damage over time to the steel seawall led to it becoming a hazard for marine life, trapping seals and turtles. The Army Corps of Engineers, who managed the seawall repair effort for FWS, have estimated the cost of repairing the seawall fully to be over $20 million. In 2000 and 2001, Congress approved $10.3 million which was combined with funds set aside by FWS for the project for a total of $11.8 million to fund seawall repairs. Work was started to repair a portion of the seawall, but was forestalled by issues with the Coast Guard's contaminated Bulky Dump site requiring cleanup before work could progress. Due to delays by the Coast Guard in providing funding or personnel for the clean-up, work instead was started on repairs in other areas and on reinforcements to prevent further erosion of Bulky Dump. In the summer of 2004, 1,200 feet of seawall were repaired for the protection of the island's shoreline, and the boat dock was replaced by a boat ramp for small boats. However, thousands of feet of seawall were still in need of repair.

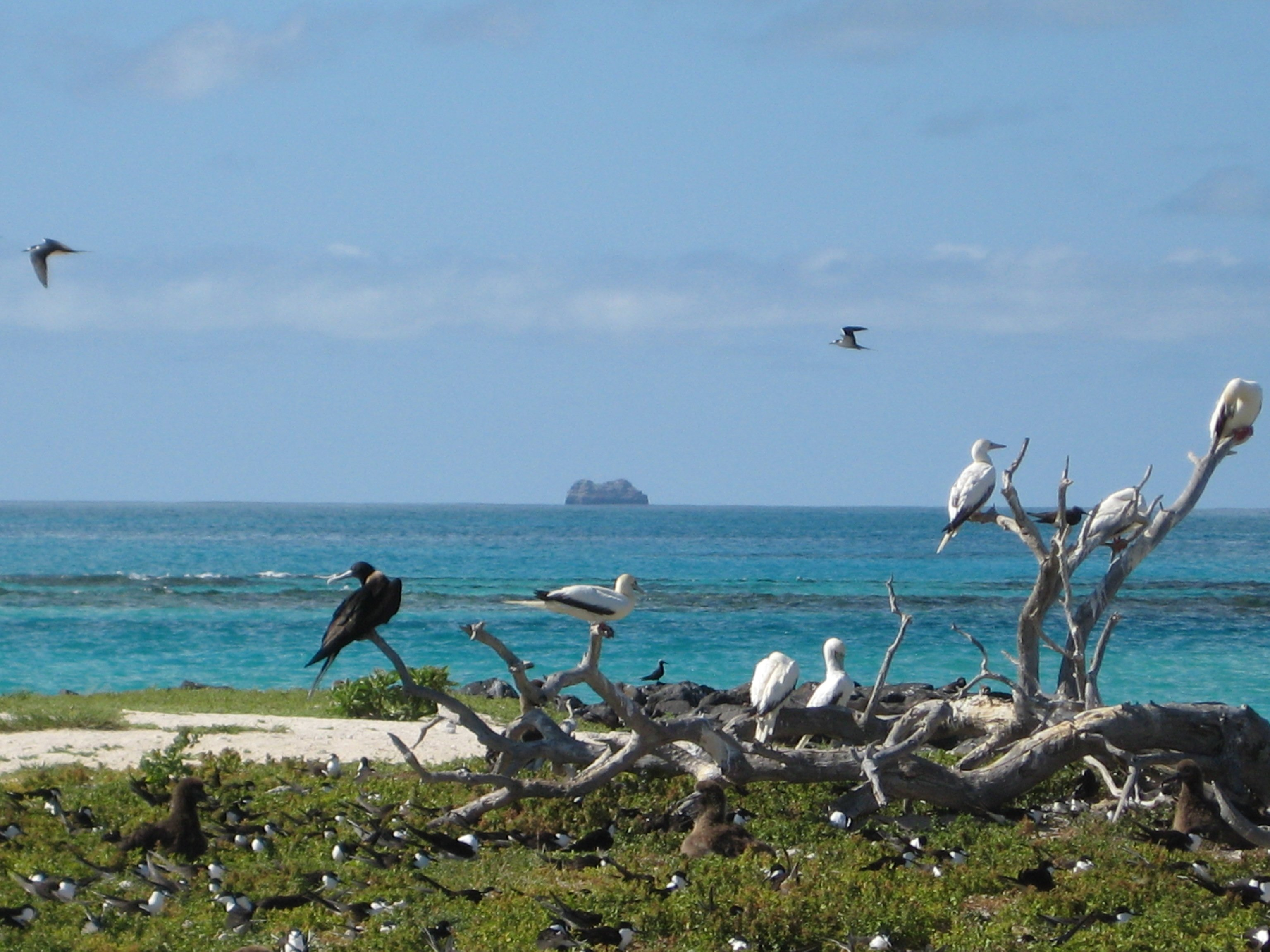
A view of from Tern Island and in the distance, La Perouse Pinnacle

A storm struck the research station in the early morning hours on December 9, 2012. Biologists at the field station were evacuated to Honolulu on the M/V Kahana on December 18. The storm caused extensive damage to the island's facilities, including the barracks, communication equipment, boat sheds, and storage buildings.

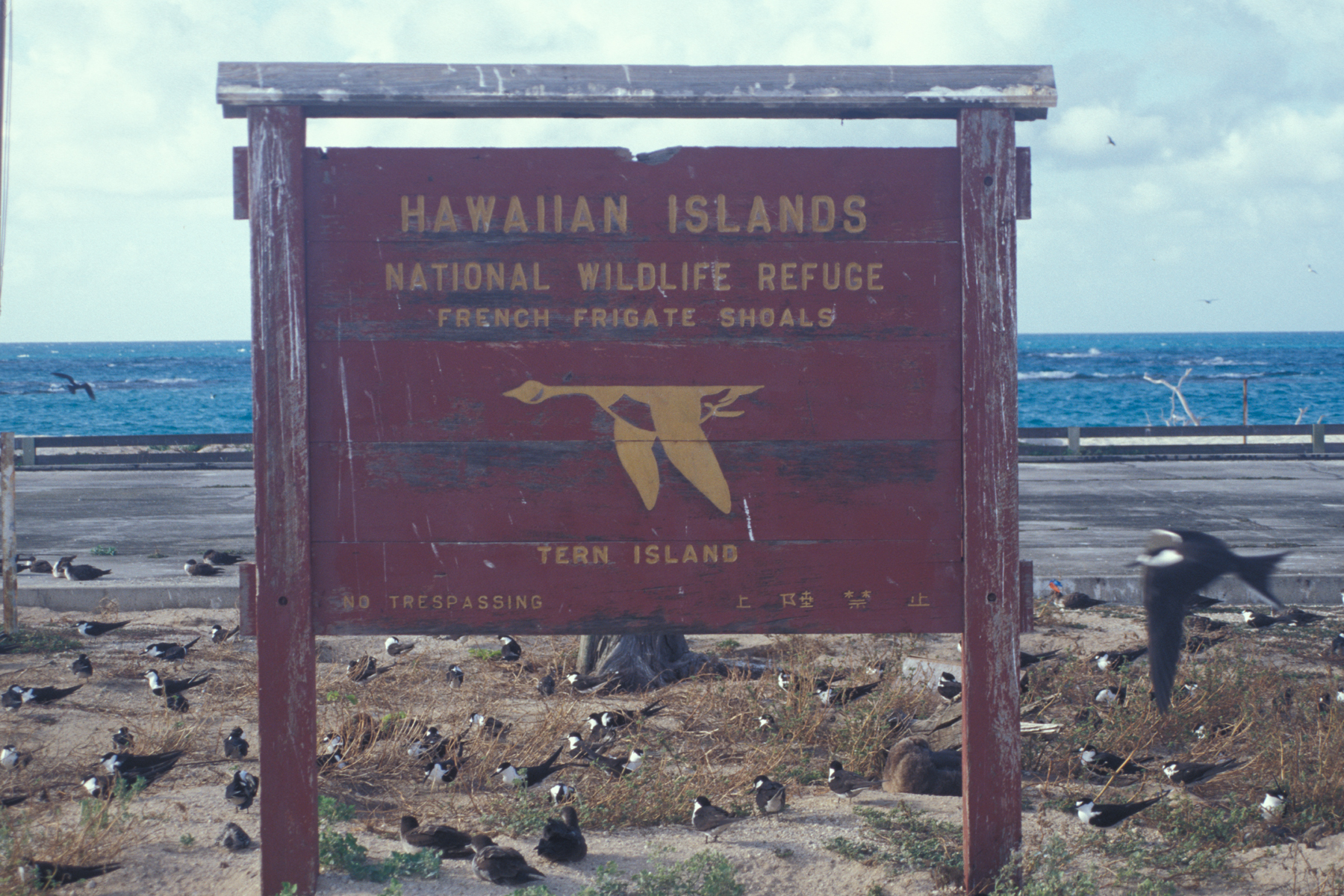
Sign noting Tern Island as part of a United States nature reserve in the French Frigate Shoals

=== Seasonal Research Activity (2013 - present) ===
In 2013, the NOAAS Oscar Elton Sette brought four NOAA field researchers, along with supplies, to establish the annual monk seal research summer field camp on Tern Island. The storm at the end of 2012 had left the barracks uninhabitable, and the water system unusable. Water had to be brought in jugs.

Tern Island has seen increasing usage by green sea turtles as a nesting site since the 1970s. In 1977, no nests were observed, and turtles seldom used or visited the island while it was occupied by the military; twenty years later, 700 nests were recorded. A 2019 survey of green sea turtles by a NOAA seasonal field research team recorded 371 total turtles. The destruction of East Island, another major nesting site for green sea turtles in the French Frigate Shoals, in 2018 following Hurricane Walaka likely displaced turtles which would have otherwise nested at East Island, leading to them seeking out Tern Island instead, increasing the volume of nesting turtles on the island's beaches.

In 2020, the beach was designated as polluted by plastic trash. This ruling came after years of research, including 14.5 thousand kilograms of trash discovered within 5000 meters of the beach over 11 years. Over 70 percent of the trash was plastic. Debris accumulation was studied in the 2010s. In the 2020s, researchers again noted the threat posed by the corroded double steel wall.

In 2020, the Papahanaumokuakea Marine Debris Project removed tons of marine debris from French Frigate Shoals, including Tern Island.

== Birds ==
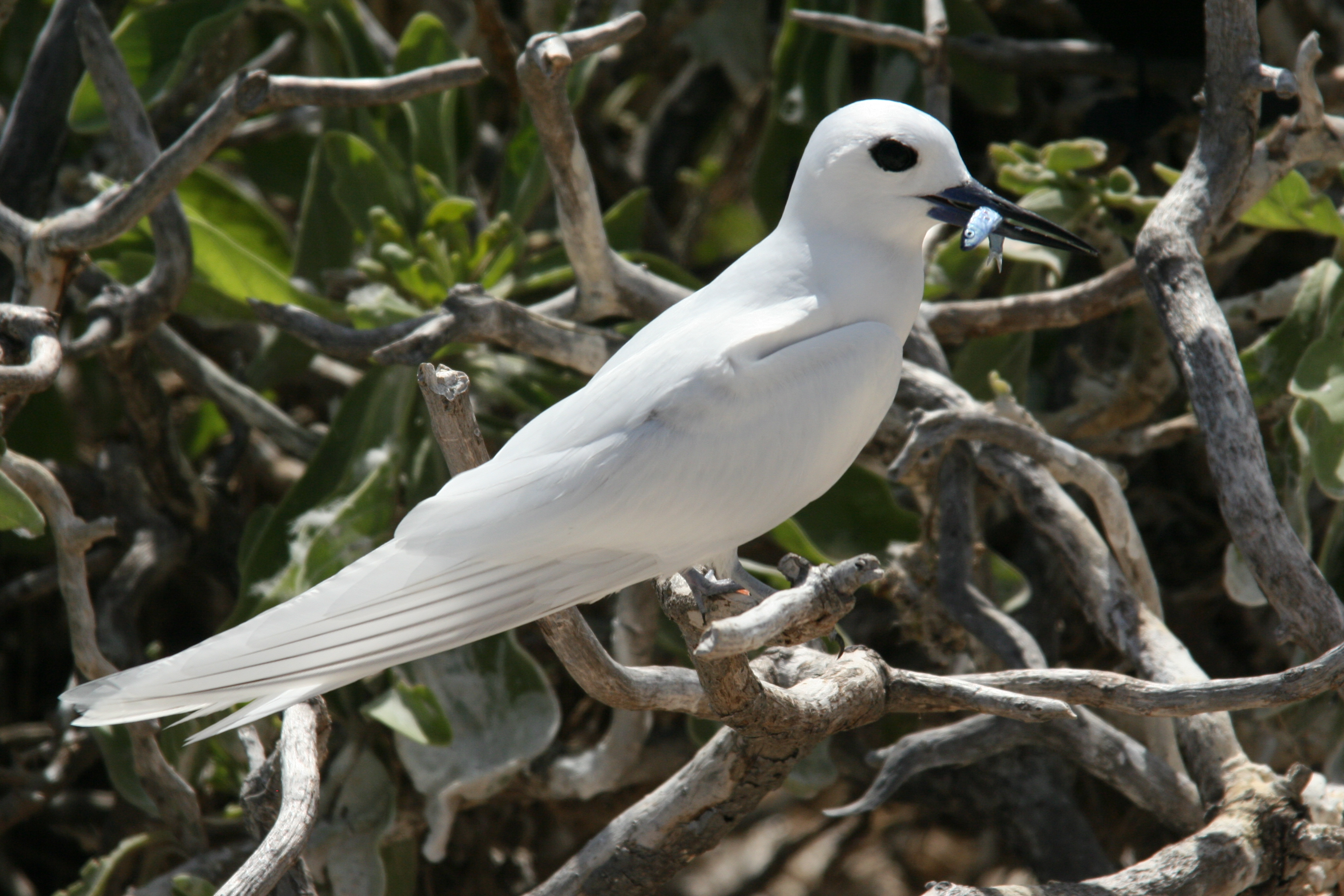
A white tern at Tern Island, 2006

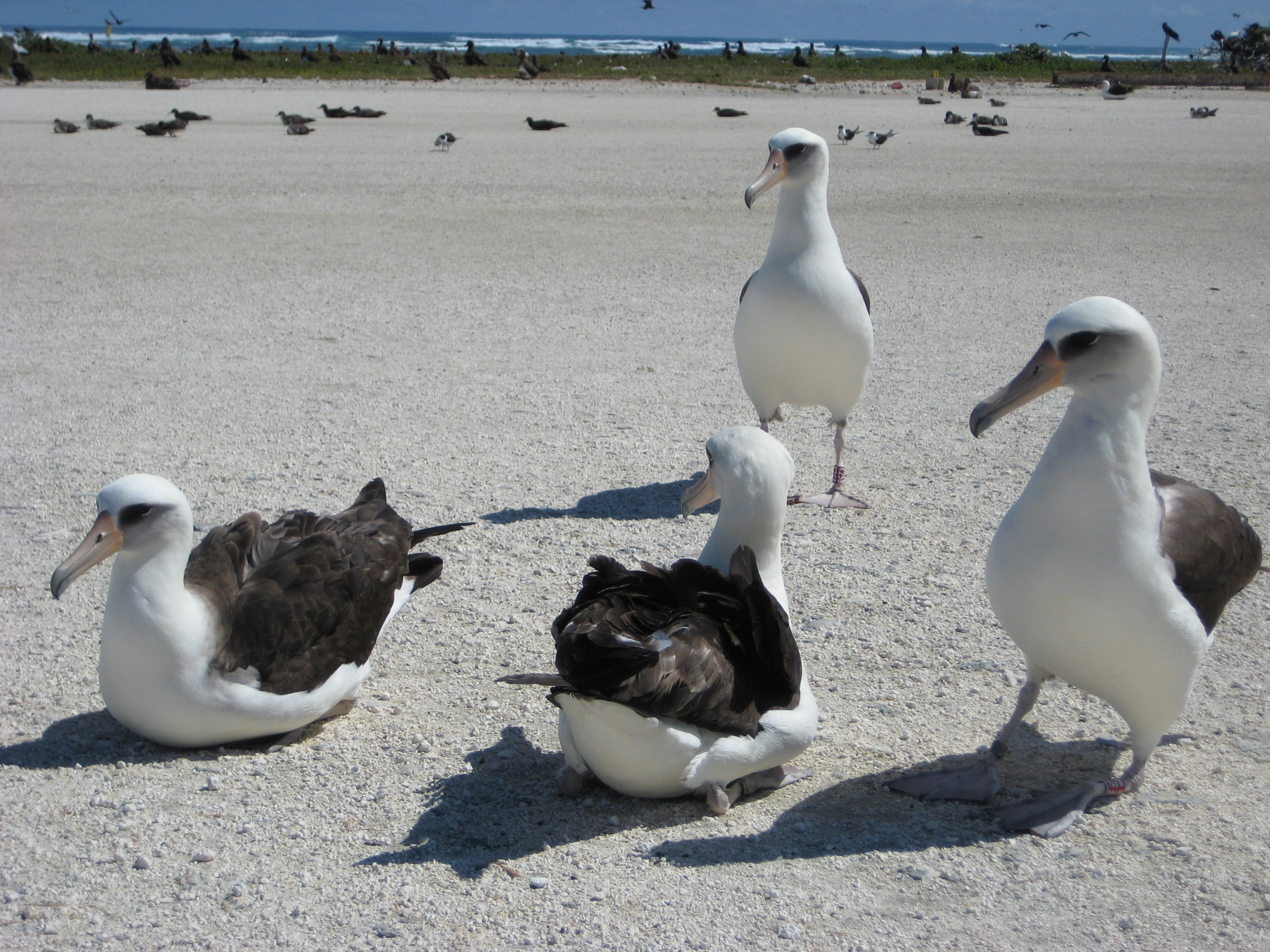
Albatrosses at Tern Island

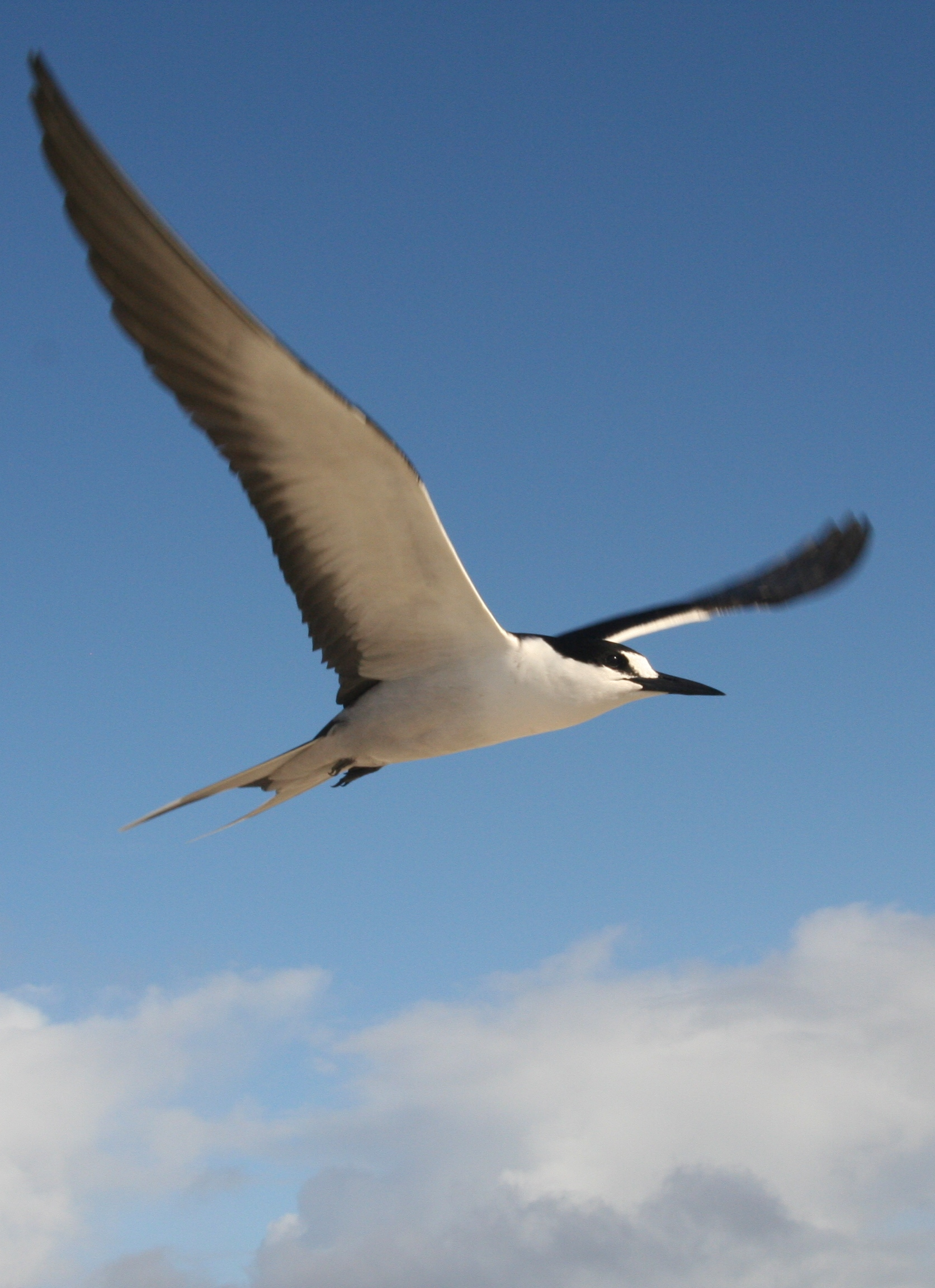
Sooty Tern in flight at Tern Island

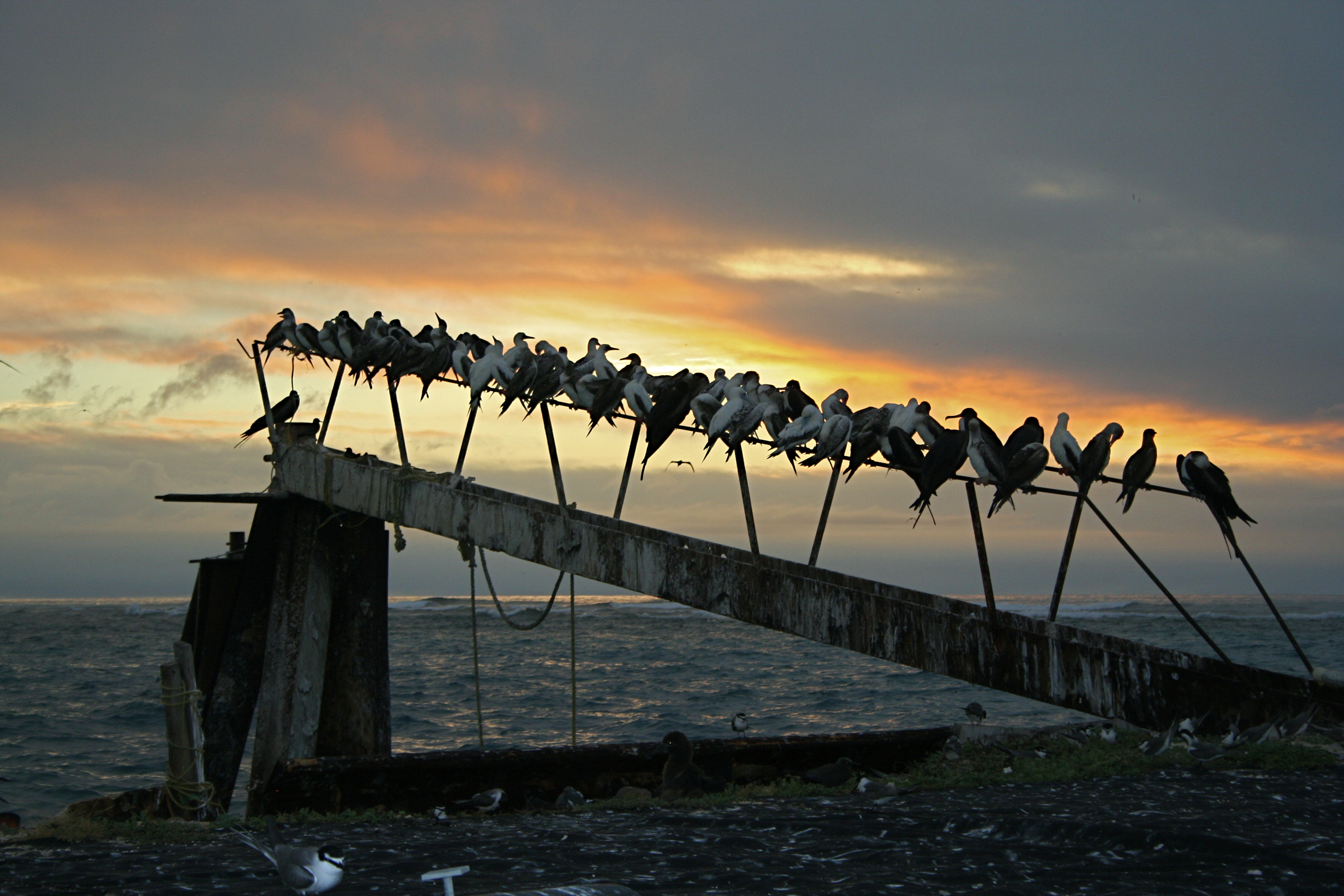
Birds and Tern Island structures

The bird populations were studied. One concern was birds eating plastic trash, which was studied between 2006 and 2013. Tern Island is a popular research site to study Pacific sea- and shore-birds.

Sixteen seabird species inhabited Tern Island in the early 21st century, including:

- Sooty tern
- White tern
- Brown noddy
- Black noddy
- Masked booby
- Brown booby
- Red-footed booby
- Wedge-tailed shearwater
- Tristram's storm petrel
- Black-footed albatross
- Laysan albatross
- Great frigatebird

In 1998 and 1999, the black-footed albatross (Phoebastria nigripes) and Laysan albatross (Phoebastria immutabilis) were studied. The research recorded a particularly unsuccessful nesting season.

In 2010, two researchers stationed on Tern Island from June through December of that year as a part of the FWS Northwestern Hawaiian Islands Nesting Seabird Monitoring Study noted observations of species of birds considered rare and unusual for the region at Tern Island. Examples include a short-eared owl (Asio flammeus), a great blue heron (Ardea herodias), and a Pacific swift (Apus pacificus). Also observed was a warbling white-eye (Zosterops japonicus), which was the first record for that species in the Northwestern Hawaiian Islands.

Tern Island provides overwintering and stop-over habitat for numerous migratory shorebirds, including:

- Pacific golden plover (Pluvialis fulva)
- Ruddy turnstone (Arenaria interpres)
- Sanderling (Calidris alba)
- Wandering tattler (Heteroscelus incanus)
- Bristle-thighed curlew (Numenius tahitensis)

== Geography ==
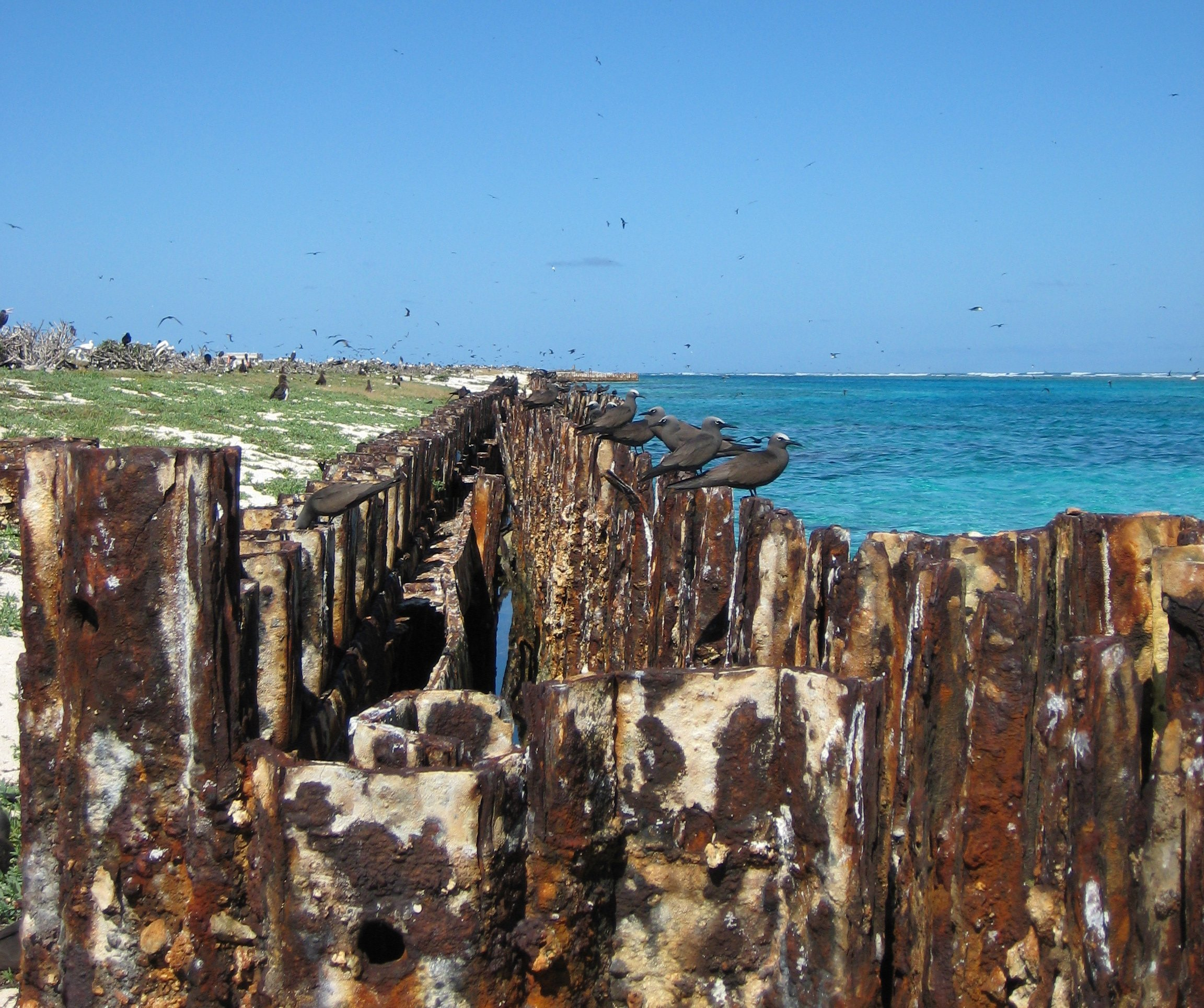
Tern's WW2-era seawall

Tern Island is composed of a mixture of natural corraline structures and dredged fill material consisting of carbonate, sand, and crushed coral materials. The runway comprises half of the island's land area and is densely compacted crushed coral. A percentage of the soil also likely consists of marine plastic and microplastics.

Island beaches include:

- Shell Beach & Crab Beach, on the north side of the island
- East Beach
- South Beach

A small boat ramp replaced dock and boat hoist in 2004.

== See also ==
- Desert island
