= List of birds of the United States =

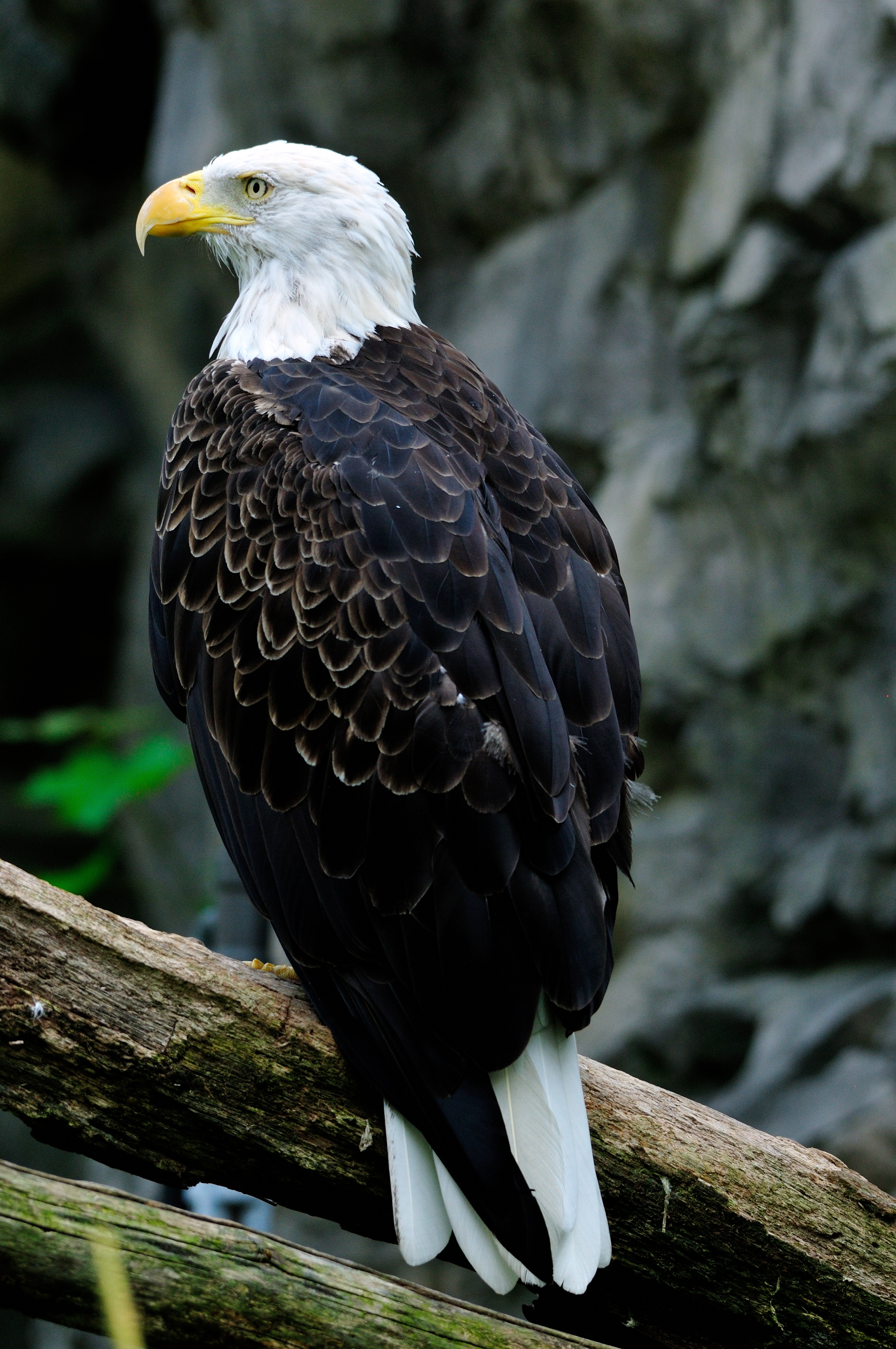
The bald eagle is the national bird of the United States.

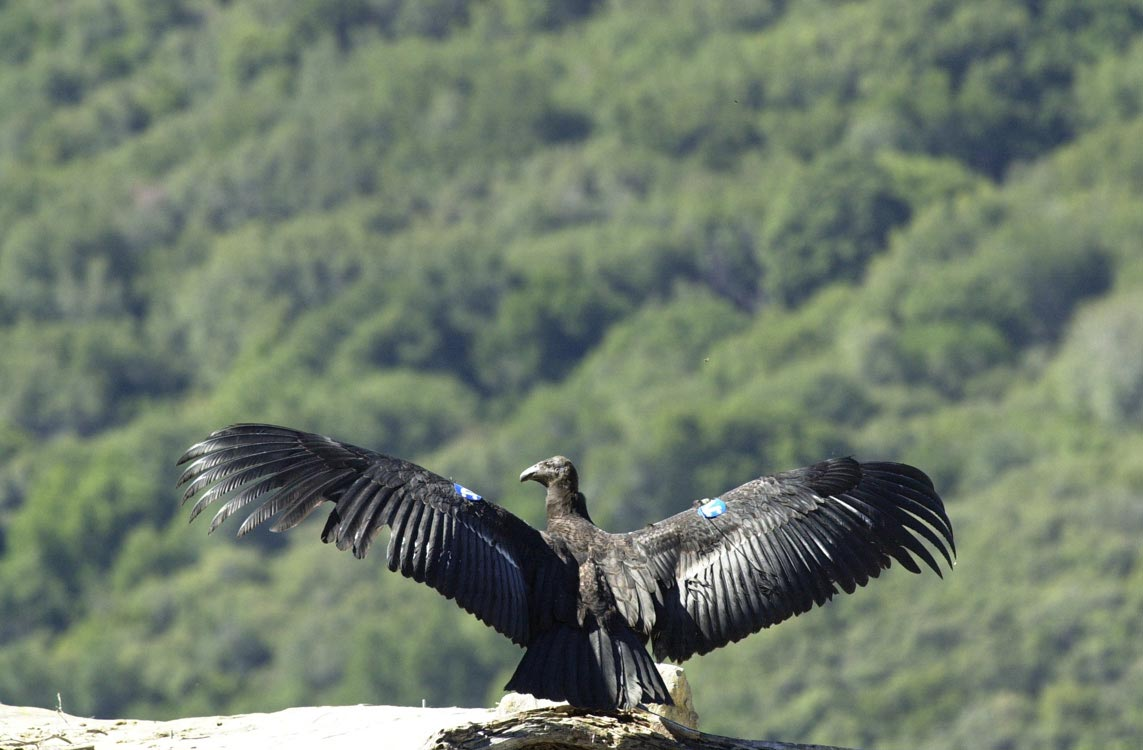
The California condor is one of North America's most endangered birds.

A comprehensive listing of all the bird species confirmed in the United States follows. It includes species from all 50 states and the District of Columbia as of July 2022. Species confirmed in other U.S. territories are also included with other "as of" dates.

The birds of the continental United States most closely resemble those of Eurasia, which was connected to the continent as part of the supercontinent Laurasia until around 60 million years ago. Many groups occur throughout the Northern Hemisphere and worldwide. However some families unique to the New World have also arisen; those represented in the list are the hummingbirds, the New World vultures, the New World quail, the tyrant flycatchers, the vireos, the mimids, the New World warblers, the tanagers, the cardinals, and the icterids.

Several common birds in the United States, such as the house sparrow, the rock pigeon, the European starling, and the mute swan are introduced species, meaning that they are not native to North America, but were brought there by humans. Introduced species are marked as (I). In addition, many non-native species which have individual escapees or small feral populations in North America are not on the list. It is especially true of birds that are commonly held as pets, such as parrots and finches.

The status of one bird on the list, the ivory-billed woodpecker, is controversial. Until 2005, the bird was widely considered to be extinct. In April of that year, it was reported that at least one adult male bird had been sighted in the Cache River National Wildlife Refuge in Arkansas. The report, however, has not been universally accepted, and the American Birding Association still lists the ivory-billed woodpecker as extinct.

Hawaii has many endemic bird species (such as the Kauaʻi ʻelepaio) that are vulnerable or endangered, and some have become extinct. The number of birds on Guam has been severely reduced by introduced brown tree snakes — several endemic species on Guam (such as the Guam flycatcher) have become extinct, while others (such as the Guam rail) have become extinct in the wild. Guam rails have since been reintroduced to the wild on Guam and Rota. There are many endemic bird species in Puerto Rico and the Northern Mariana Islands, while American Samoa has South Pacific bird species (such as the many-colored fruit dove) found in no other part of the United States.

== Sources and geographic coverage ==
The majority of this list is derived from the Check-list of North and Middle American Birds, 7th edition through the 63rd Supplement, published by the American Ornithological Society (AOS) and the Bird Checklists of the World (Avibase). The geographic territory of that source which applies to the article is the 48 contiguous states, the District of Columbia, Alaska, Hawaii, the adjacent islands under the jurisdiction of those states, Puerto Rico, and the American Virgin Islands.

The article also includes birds found in the other U.S. territories (American Samoa, Guam, the Northern Mariana Islands, and the U.S. Minor Outlying Islands). In total, the list of birds in the article includes bird species found in the 50 states, the District of Columbia, and all U.S. territories.

The source for birds in the U.S. territories is the Avibase website: Bird checklists of the world (American Samoa), Bird checklists of the world (Guam), Bird checklists of the world (Northern Mariana Islands), Bird checklists of the world (Puerto Rico), Bird checklists of the world (United States Virgin Islands), and Bird Checklists of the world (U.S. Minor Outlying Islands).

When a bird's presence in the U.S. only occurs within a U.S. territory such as Puerto Rico, the name of the territory is noted alongside the bird's name.

== Taxonomy and status ==
For species found in the 50 states, Puerto Rico, and the U.S. Virgin Islands, the taxonomic treatment (designation and sequence of orders, families and species) and nomenclature (common and scientific names) used in the list are those of the AOS, the recognized scientific authority on the taxonomy and nomenclature of North and Middle American birds. However, the common names of families are from the Clements taxonomy because the AOS list does not include them. The AOS's Committee on Classification and Nomenclature, the body responsible for maintaining and updating the Check-list, "strongly and unanimously continues to endorse the biological species concept (BSC), in which species are considered to be genetically cohesive groups of populations that are reproductively isolated from other such groups". The sequence and names of families and species found in American Samoa, Guam, and the U.S. Minor Outlying Islands follow the Clements taxonomy because the AOS does not address those areas.

Unless otherwise noted, the species listed here are considered to occur regularly in the United States as permanent residents, summer or winter residents or visitors, or annual migrants. The following tags are used to designate some species:

- (A) Accidental - occurrence based on one or two (rarely more) records and unlikely to occur regularly
- (C) Casual - occurrence based on two or a few records, with subsequent records not improbable
- (E) Extinct - a species which no longer exists
- (Ex) Extirpated - a species which no longer occurs in the United States, but other populations still exist elsewhere
- (I) Introduced - a species established solely as result of direct or indirect human intervention; synonymous with non-native and non-indigenous
- (EH) Endemic to Hawaii - a native species found only in Hawaii
- (EG) Endemic to Guam - a native species found only in Guam
- (ENM) Endemic to the Northern Mariana Islands - a native species found only in the Northern Mariana Islands
- (EP) Endemic to Puerto Rico - a native species found only in Puerto Rico
- (EU) Endemic to the U.S. Minor Outlying Islands - a native species found only in the U.S. Minor Outlying Islands
- (EM) Endemic to the mainland - a native species found only in the 48 contiguous states, Alaska, and their adjacent islands

The (A) and (C) tags correspond to the codes 5 and 4 respectively of the American Birding Association. The (E), (Ex), and (I) tags describe species' status according to the AOS. The (EH) tags follow the AOS list and the (EM) tags are based on the Clements taxonomy.

Population status symbols are those of the Red List published by the International Union for Conservation of Nature (IUCN). The symbols apply to the species' worldwide status, not their status solely in the United States except for endemic species. The symbols and their meanings, in increasing order of peril, are:

LC = least concern NT = near threatened VU = vulnerable EN = endangered CR = critically endangered EW = extinct in the wild EX = extinct

== By the numbers ==
This list contains 1125 species found in the 50 states and the District of Columbia. Of these 1125, 155 are tagged as accidental, 101 as casual, and 55 as introduced. Thirty-three are known to be extinct and one, the thick-billed parrot, has been extirpated though a population remains in Mexico. Thirty-three living species are endemic to Hawaii; an additional 28 former Hawaiian endemics are known to be extinct and a few others are thought to be. Sixteen species are endemic to the 48 contiguous states and one to Alaska.

There are an additional 146 species whose presence in the United States is only within one or more U.S. territories; some of those species have become extinct. The total number of bird species on the list is 1267 (i.e. the 1120 bird species found in the 50 states and District of Columbia, plus the 146 species found only in the U.S. territories). Some of the species found in the 50 states and District of Columbia are also found in the U.S. territories.

== Ducks, geese, and waterfowl ==
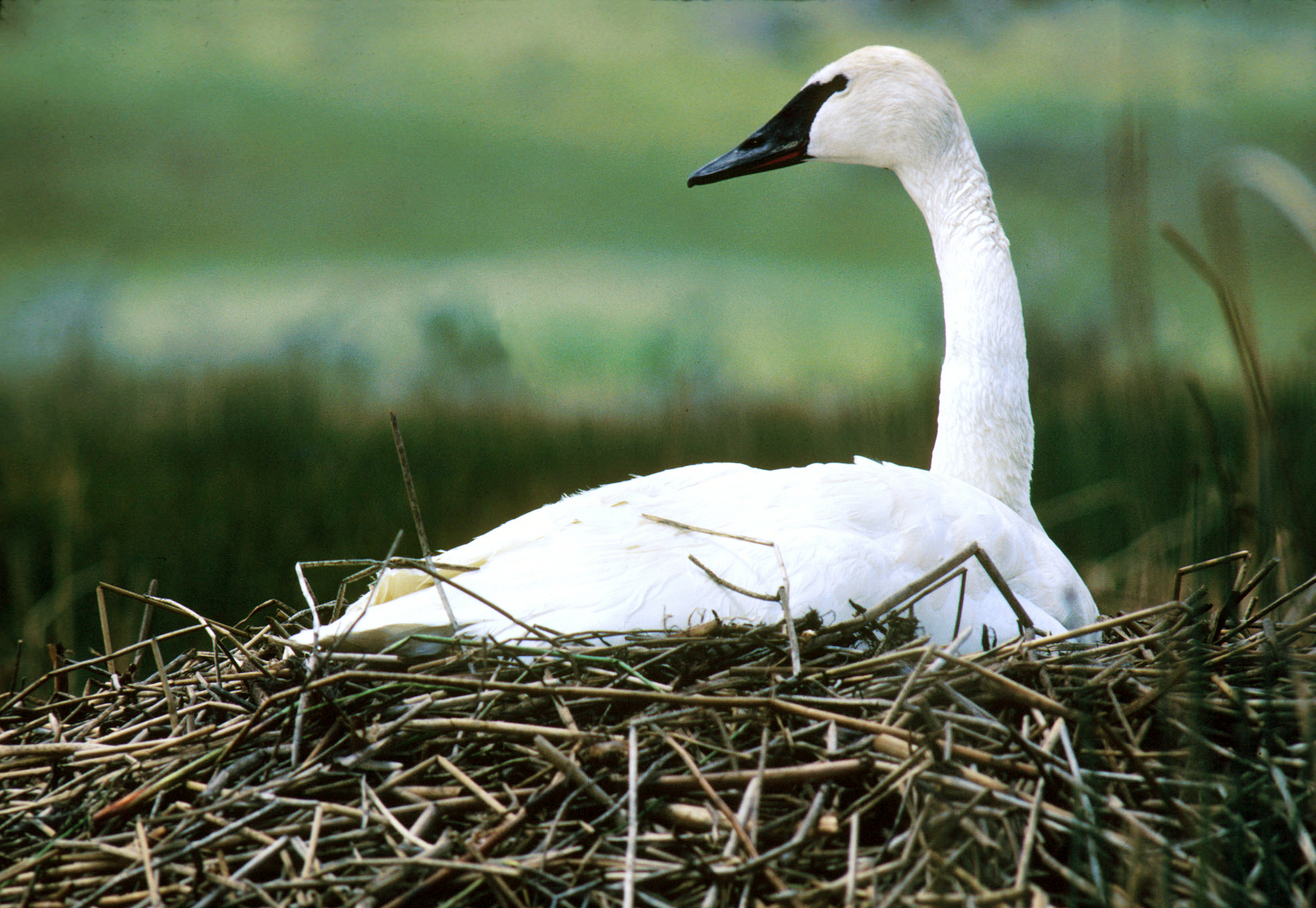
Trumpeter swan

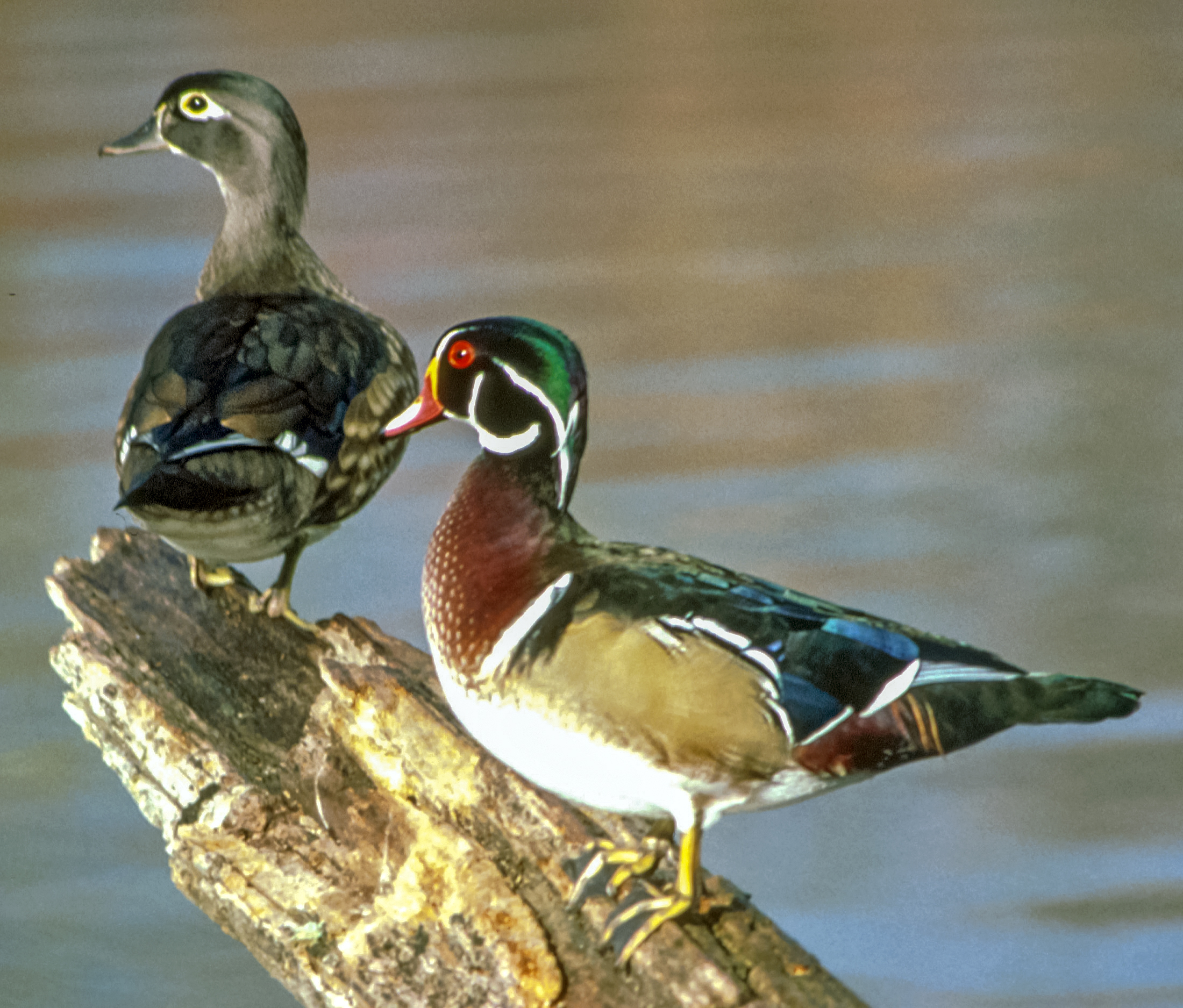
Wood duck pair

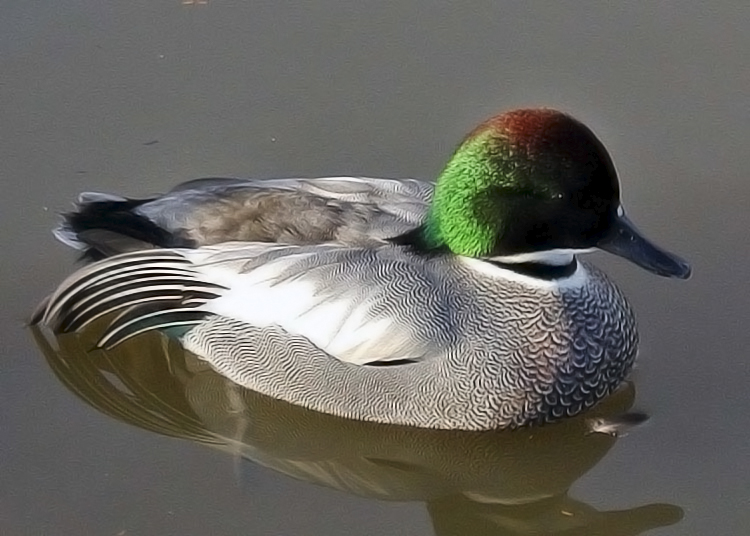
Falcated duck

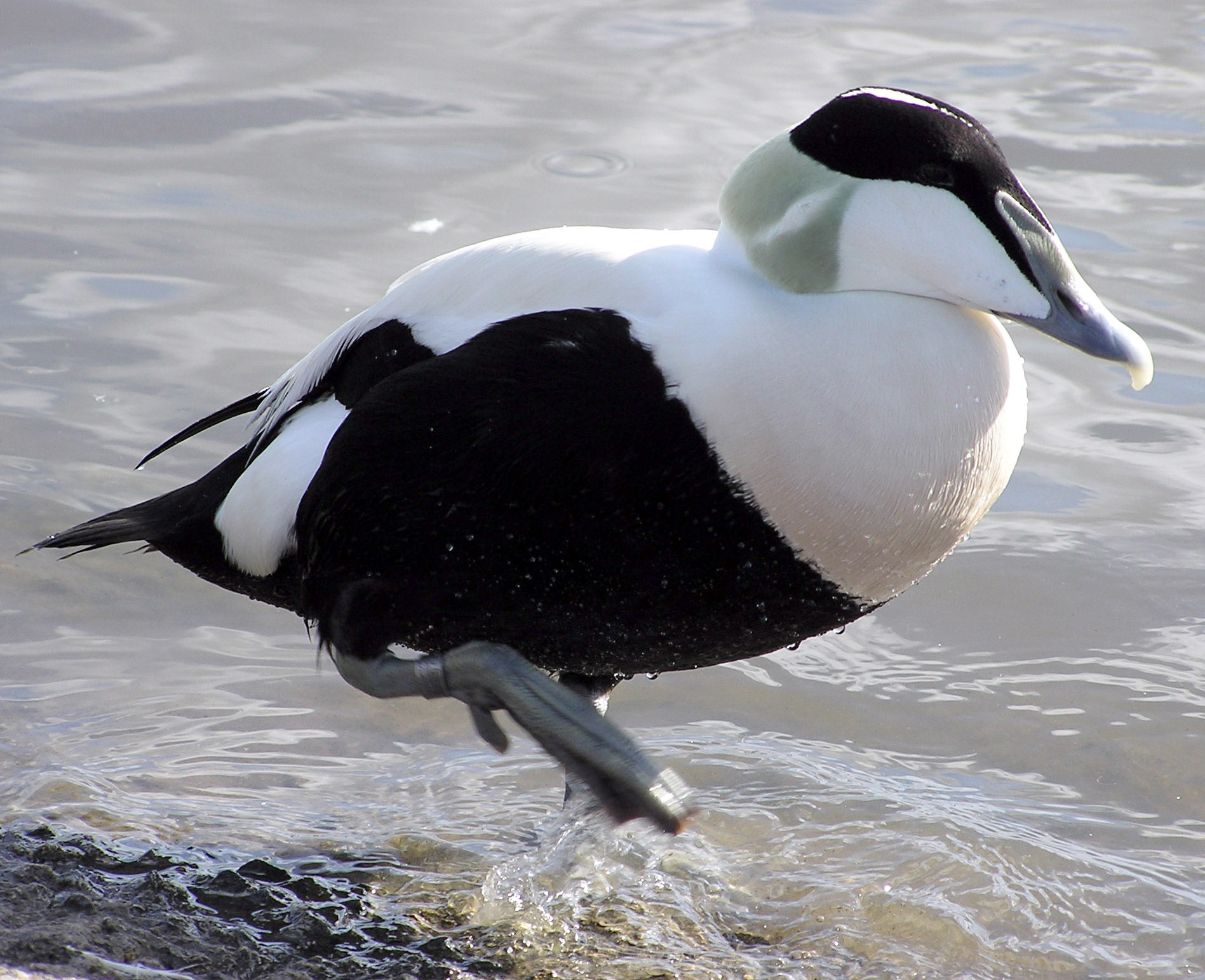
Common eider

Order: Anseriformes Family: Anatidae

Anatidae includes the ducks and most duck-like waterfowl, such as geese and swans. These birds are adapted to an aquatic existence with webbed feet, bills which are flattened to a greater or lesser extent, and feathers that are excellent at shedding water due to special oils.

- White-faced whistling-duck, Dendrocygna viduata (U.S. Virgin Islands) (A) LC
- Black-bellied whistling-duck, Dendrocygna autumnalis LC
- West Indian whistling-duck, Dendrocygna arborea (Puerto Rico, U.S. Virgin Islands) NT
- Fulvous whistling-duck, Dendrocygna bicolor LC
- Emperor goose, Anser canagica NT
- Snow goose, Anser caerulescens LC
- Ross's goose, Anser rossii LC
- Graylag goose, Anser anser (A) LC
- Greater white-fronted goose, Anser albifrons LC
- Lesser white-fronted goose, Anser erythropus (A) VU
- Taiga bean-goose, Anser fabalis LC
- Tundra bean-goose, Anser serrirostris LC
- Pink-footed goose, Anser brachyrhynchus (C) LC
- Brant, Branta bernicla LC
- Barnacle goose, Branta leucopsis (C) LC
- Cackling goose, Branta hutchinsii LC
- Canada goose, Branta canadensis LC
- Hawaiian goose, Branta sandvicensis (EH) VU
- Mute swan, Cygnus olor (I) LC
- Black swan, Cygnus atratus (I) LC
- Trumpeter swan, Cygnus buccinator LC
- Tundra swan, Cygnus columbianus LC
- Whooper swan, Cygnus cygnus LC
- Egyptian goose, Alopochen aegyptiaca (I) LC
- Common shelduck, Tadorna tadorna (C) LC
- Muscovy duck, Cairina moschata LC
- Wood duck, Aix sponsa LC
- Baikal teal, Sibirionetta formosa (C) LC
- Garganey, Spatula querquedula (C) LC
- Blue-winged teal, Spatula discors LC
- Cinnamon teal, Spatula cyanoptera LC
- Northern shoveler, Spatula clypeata LC
- Gadwall, Mareca strepera LC
- Falcated duck, Mareca falcata (C) NT
- Eurasian wigeon, Mareca penelope LC
- American wigeon, Mareca americana LC
- Pacific black duck, Anas superciliosa (American Samoa) LC
- Laysan duck, Anas laysanensis (EH) (Note: The Laysan duck was introduced to Midway Atoll (in the U.S. Minor Outlying Islands), but the native population is considered endemic to the state of Hawaii.) CR
- Hawaiian duck, Anas wyvilliana (EH) EN
- Eastern spot-billed duck, Anas zonorhyncha (C) LC
- Mallard, Anas platyrhynchos LC
- Mexican duck, Anas diazi (not yet assessed by the IUCN)
- American black duck, Anas rubripes LC
- Mottled duck, Anas fulvigula LC
- White-cheeked pintail, Anas bahamensis (C) LC
- Northern pintail, Anas acuta LC
- Green-winged teal, Anas crecca LC
- Canvasback, Aythya valisineria LC
- Redhead, Aythya americana LC
- Common pochard, Aythya ferina VU
- Ring-necked duck, Aythya collaris LC
- Tufted duck, Aythya fuligula (A) LC
- Greater scaup, Aythya marila LC
- Lesser scaup, Aythya affinis LC
- Steller's eider, Polysticta stelleri VU
- Spectacled eider, Somateria fischeri NT
- King eider, Somateria spectabilis LC
- Common eider, Somateria mollissima NT
- Harlequin duck, Histrionicus histrionicus LC
- Labrador duck, Camptorhynchus labradorius (E) EX
- Surf scoter, Melanitta perspicillata LC
- Velvet scoter, Melanitta fusca LC
- White-winged scoter, Melanitta deglandi LC
- Stejneger's scoter, Melanitta stejnegeri LC
- Common scoter, Melanitta nigra LC
- Black scoter, Melanitta americana NT
- Long-tailed duck, Clangula hyemalis VU
- Bufflehead, Bucephala albeola LC
- Common goldeneye, Bucephala clangula LC
- Barrow's goldeneye, Bucephala islandica LC
- Smew, Mergellus albellus (A) LC
- Hooded merganser, Lophodytes cucullatus LC
- Common merganser, Mergus merganser LC
- Red-breasted merganser, Mergus serrator LC
- Masked duck, Nomonyx dominicus LC
- Ruddy duck, Oxyura jamaicensis LC

== Megapodes ==
Order: Galliformes Family: Megapodiidae

The Megapodiidae are stocky, medium-large chicken-like birds with small heads and large feet. All but the malleefowl occupy jungle habitats and most have brown or black coloring.

- Micronesian scrubfowl, Megapodius laperouse (Northern Mariana Islands; extirpated from Guam) EN

== Guans, chachalacas, and curassows ==
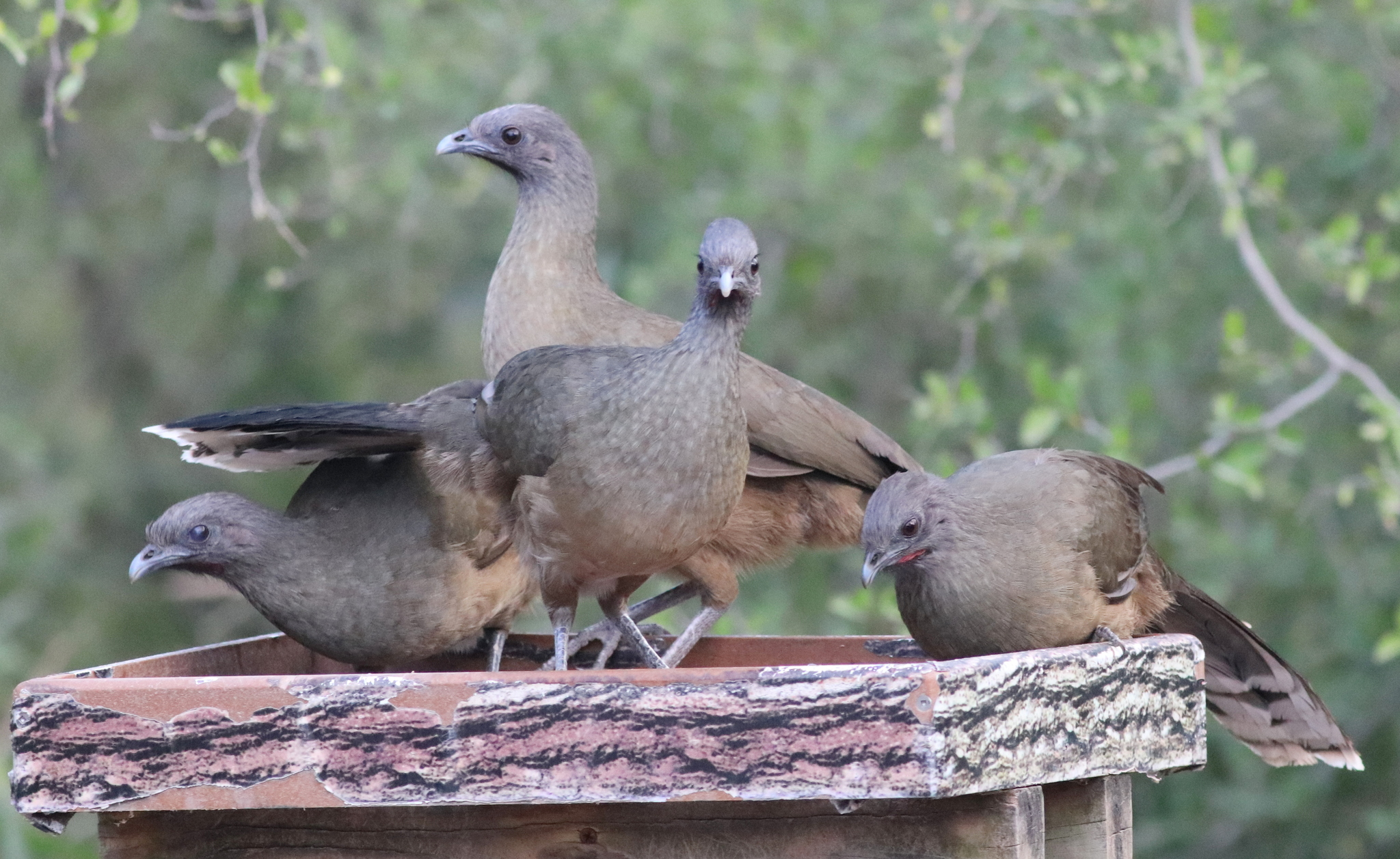
Plain chachala

Order: Galliformes Family: Cracidae

The chachalacas, guans, and curassows are birds in the family Cracidae. These are large birds, similar in general appearance to turkeys. The guans and curassows live in trees, but the smaller chachalacas are found in more open scrubby habitats. They are generally dull-plumaged, but the curassows and some guans have colorful facial ornaments.

- Plain chachalaca, Ortalis vetula LC

== New World quail ==
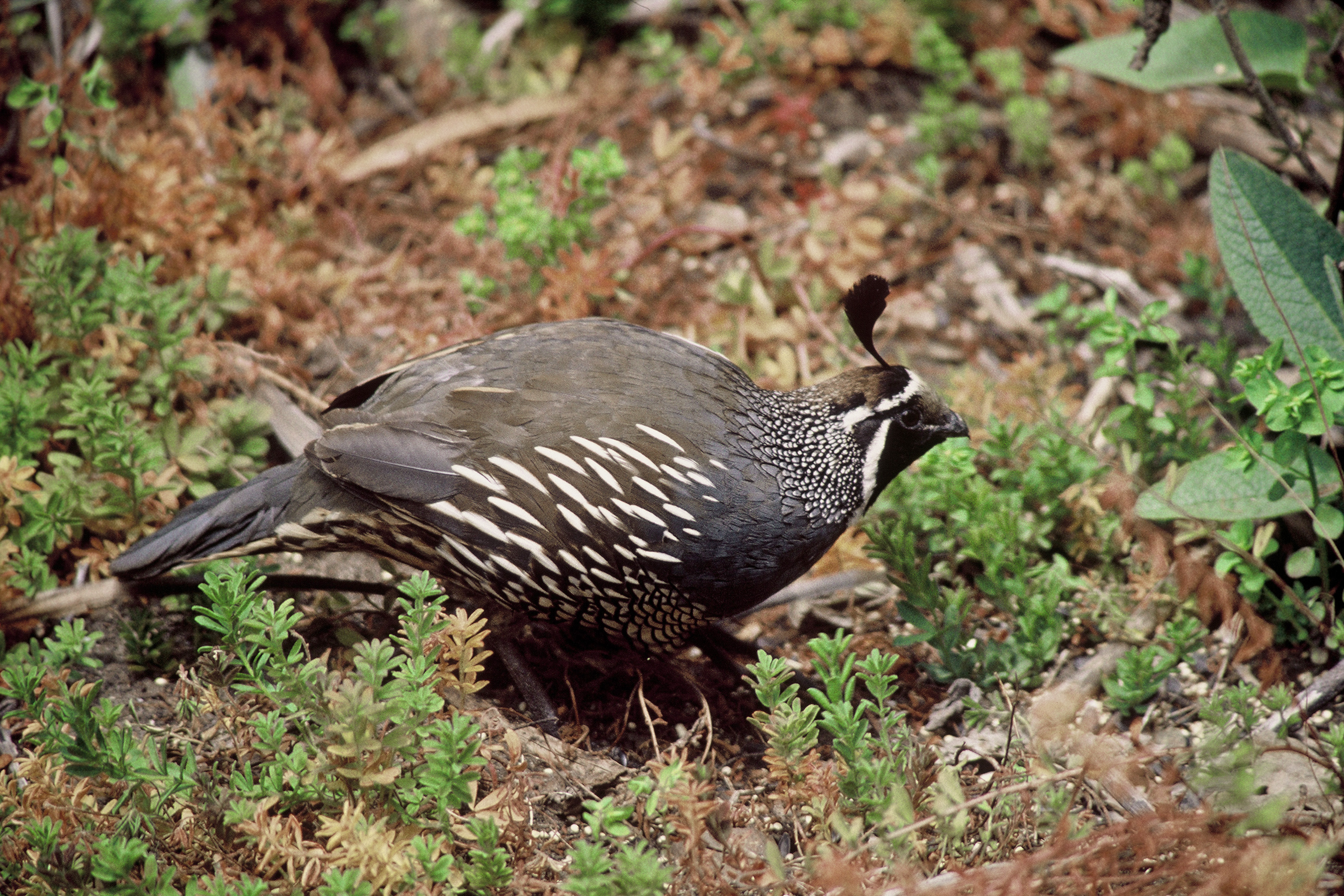
California quail

Order: Galliformes Family: Odontophoridae

The New World quails are small, plump terrestrial birds only distantly related to the quails of the Old World, but named for their similar appearance and habits.

- Mountain quail, Oreortyx pictus LC
- Northern bobwhite, Colinus virginianus NT
- Crested bobwhite, Colinus cristatus (U.S. Virgin Islands) (Ex) (I) LC
- Scaled quail, Callipepla squamata LC
- California quail, Callipepla californica LC
- Gambel's quail, Callipepla gambelii LC
- Montezuma quail, Cyrtonyx montezumae LC

== Pheasants, grouse, and allies ==
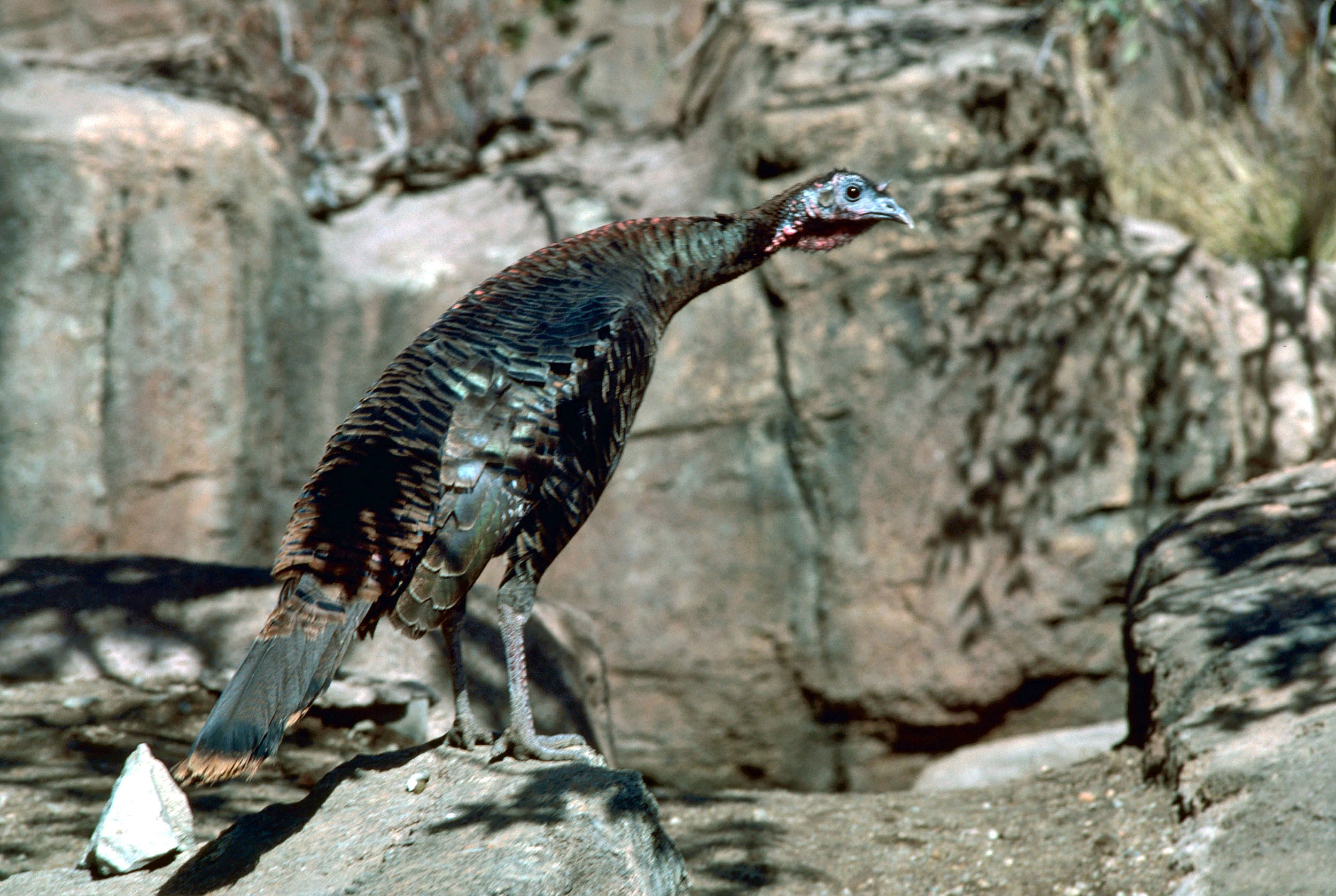
Wild turkey

Order: Galliformes Family: Phasianidae

Phasianidae consists of the pheasants and their allies. These are terrestrial species, variable in size but generally plump with broad relatively short wings. Many species are gamebirds or have been domesticated as a food source for humans.

- Wild turkey, Meleagris gallopavo LC
- Ruffed grouse, Bonasa umbellus LC
- Spruce grouse, Canachites canadensis LC
- Willow ptarmigan, Lagopus lagopus LC
- Rock ptarmigan, Lagopus muta LC
- White-tailed ptarmigan, Lagopus leucura LC
- Greater sage-grouse, Centrocercus urophasianus NT
- Gunnison sage-grouse, Centrocercus minimus (EM) EN
- Dusky grouse, Dendragapus obscurus LC
- Sooty grouse, Dendragapus fuliginosus LC
- Sharp-tailed grouse, Tympanuchus phasianellus LC
- Greater prairie-chicken, Tympanuchus cupido (EM) (Note: The greater prairie-chicken has been extirpated from its former Canadian range, but is possibly repopulating there from the U.S.) NT
- Lesser prairie-chicken, Tympanuchus pallidicinctus (EM) VU
- Gray partridge, Perdix perdix (I) LC
- Ring-necked pheasant, Phasianus colchicus (I) LC
- Kalij pheasant, Lophura leucomelanos (I) LC
- Indian peafowl, Pavo cristatus (I) LC
- Gray francolin, Ortygornis pondicerianus (I) LC
- Black francolin, Francolinus francolinus (I) LC
- Red junglefowl, Gallus gallus (I) (All U.S. territories — AS, GU, MP, PR, VI, UM) LC
- Himalayan snowcock, Tetraogallus himalayensis (I) LC
- Chukar, Alectoris chukar (I) LC
- Erckel's francolin, Pternistis erckelii (I) LC
- Blue-breasted quail, Synoicus chinensis (Guam) (I) LC
- Japanese quail, Coturnix japonica (I) NT

== Flamingos ==
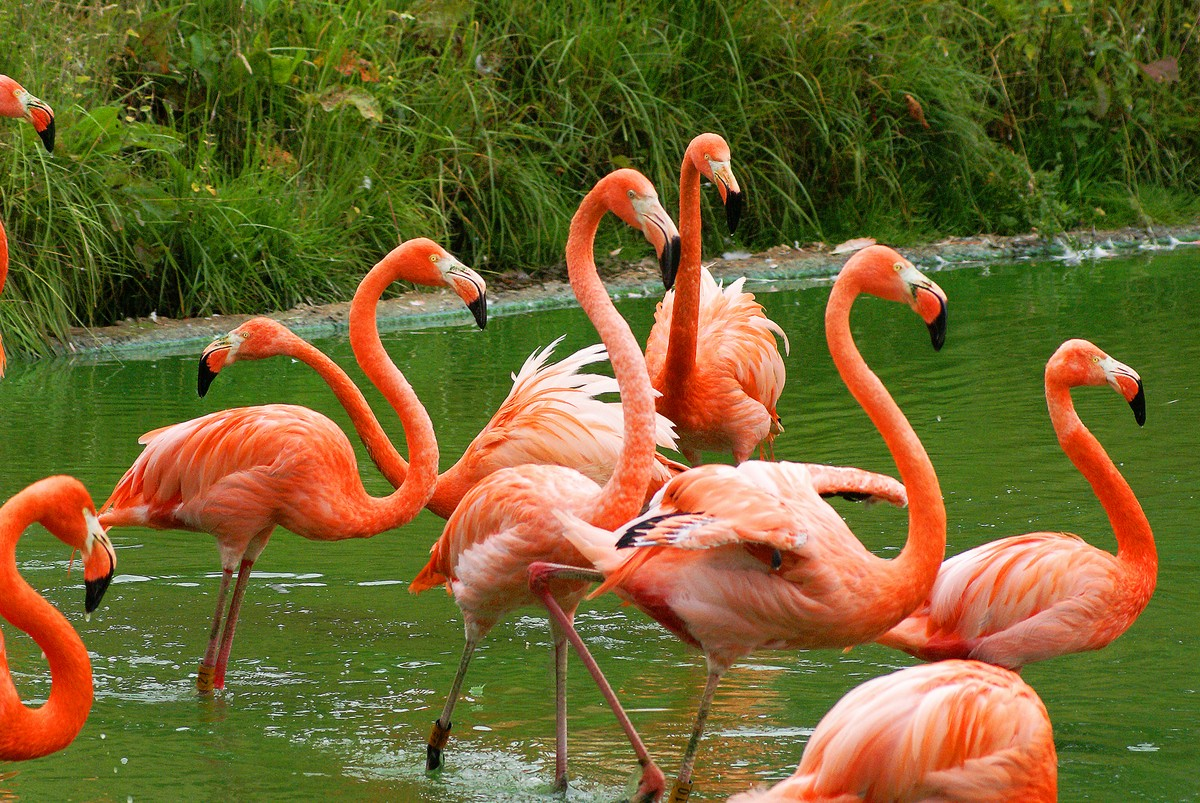
American flamingo

Order: Phoenicopteriformes Family: Phoenicopteridae

Flamingos are gregarious wading birds, usually 3 to 5 feet (0.9 to 1.5 m) tall, found in both the Western and Eastern Hemispheres. Flamingos filter-feed on shellfish and algae. Their oddly shaped beaks are specially adapted to separate mud and silt from the food they consume and, uniquely, are used upside-down.

- American flamingo, Phoenicopterus ruber LC

== Grebes ==
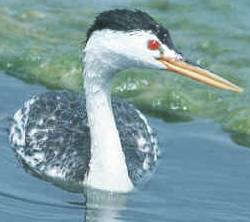
Clark's grebe

Order: Podicipediformes Family: Podicipedidae

Grebes are small to medium-large freshwater diving birds. They have lobed toes and are excellent swimmers and divers. However, they have their feet placed far back on the body, making them quite ungainly on land.

- Least grebe, Tachybaptus dominicus LC
- Little grebe, Tachybaptus ruficollis (Northern Mariana Islands) (A) LC
- Pied-billed grebe, Podilymbus podiceps LC
- Horned grebe, Podiceps auritus VU
- Red-necked grebe, Podiceps grisegena LC
- Eared grebe, Podiceps nigricollis LC
- Western grebe, Aechmophorus occidentalis LC
- Clark's grebe, Aechmophorus clarkii LC

== Sandgrouse ==
Order: Pterocliformes Family: Pteroclidae

Sandgrouse have small pigeon-like heads and necks, but sturdy compact bodies. They have long pointed wings and sometimes tails and a fast direct flight. Their legs are feathered down to the toes.

- Chestnut-bellied sandgrouse, Pterocles exustus (I) LC

== Pigeons and doves ==
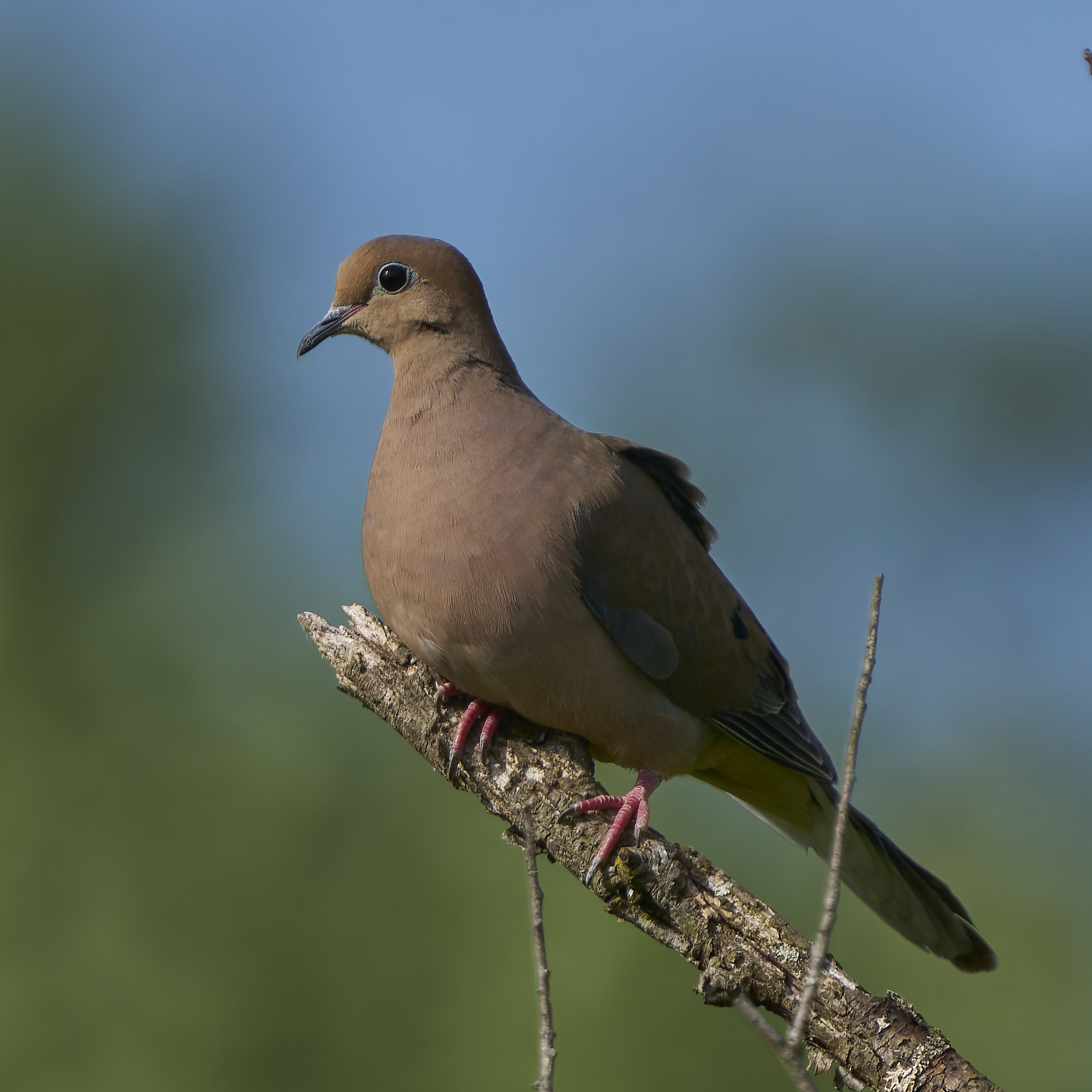
Mourning dove

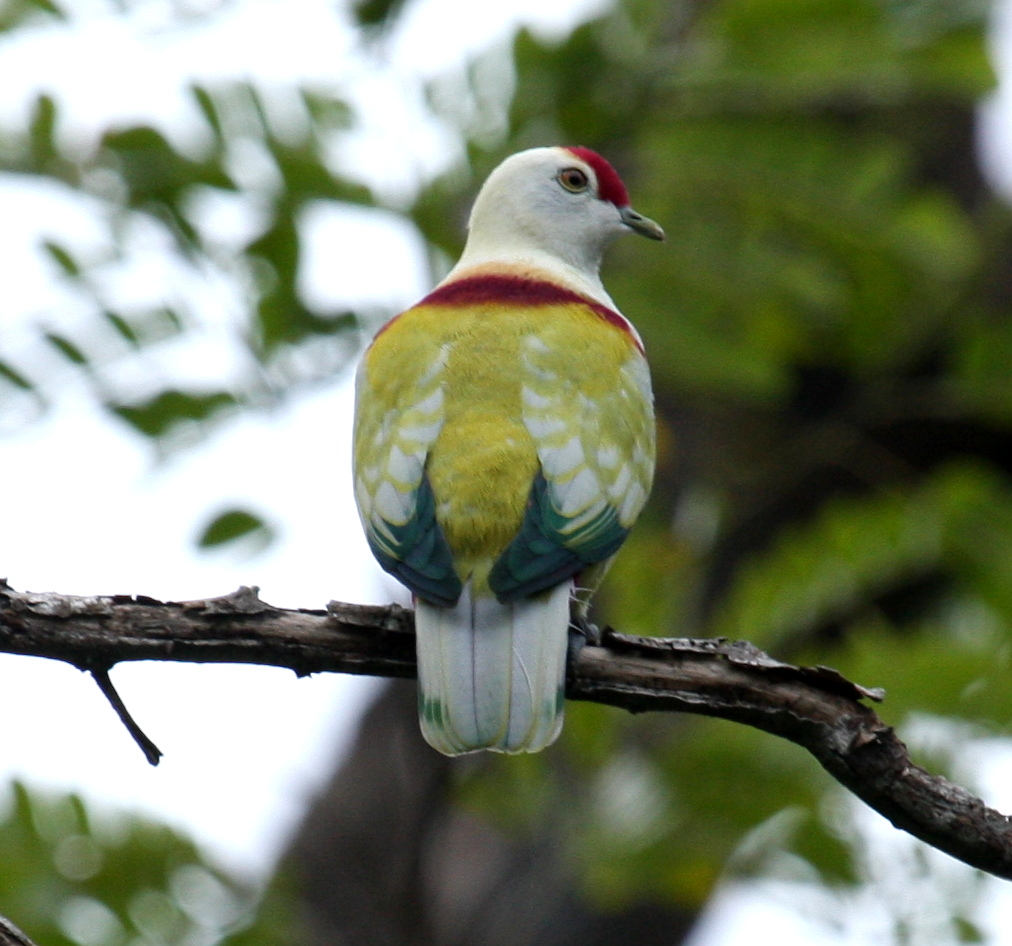
Many-colored fruit-dove

Order: Columbiformes Family: Columbidae

Pigeons and doves are stout-bodied birds with short necks and short slender bills with a fleshy cere. They feed on seeds, fruit, and plants. Unlike most other birds, the doves and pigeons produce "crop milk," which is secreted by a sloughing of fluid-filled cells from the lining of the crop. Both sexes produce the highly nutritious substance to feed to the young.

- Rock pigeon, Columba livia (I) LC
- Scaly-naped pigeon, Patagioenas squamosa (A) LC
- White-crowned pigeon, Patagioenas leucocephala NT
- Red-billed pigeon, Patagioenas flavirostris LC
- Plain pigeon, Patagioenas inornata (Puerto Rico) NT
- Band-tailed pigeon, Patagioenas fasciata LC
- European turtle-dove Streptopelia turtur (Single vagrant record in 2001) VU.
- Oriental turtle-dove, Streptopelia orientalis (C) LC
- Philippine collared-dove, Streptopelia dusumieri (Guam, Northern Mariana Islands) (I) VU
- Eurasian collared-dove, Streptopelia decaocto (I) LC
- African collared-dove, Streptopelia roseogrisea (Puerto Rico) (I) LC
- Spotted dove, Spilopelia chinensis (I) LC
- Shy ground-dove, Alopecoenas stairi (American Samoa) VU
- White-throated ground-dove, Alopecoenas xanthonurus (Guam, Northern Mariana Islands) NT
- Diamond dove, Geopelia cuneata (Puerto Rico) (I) LC
- Zebra dove, Geopelia striata (I) LC
- Passenger pigeon, Ectopistes migratorius (E) EX
- Inca dove, Columbina inca LC
- Common ground dove, Columbina passerina LC
- Ruddy ground dove, Columbina talpacoti LC
- Ruddy quail-dove, Geotrygon montana (A) LC
- Key West quail-dove, Geotrygon chrysia (C) LC
- Bridled quail-dove, Geotrygon mystacea (Puerto Rico, U.S. Virgin Islands) (A) VU
- White-tipped dove, Leptotila verreauxi LC
- White-winged dove, Zenaida asiatica LC
- Zenaida dove, Zenaida aurita (A) LC
- Mourning dove, Zenaida macroura LC
- Many-colored fruit-dove, Ptilinopus perousii (American Samoa) LC
- Crimson-crowned fruit-dove, Ptilinopus porphyraceus (American Samoa) LC
- Mariana fruit-dove, Ptilinopus roseicapilla (Northern Mariana Islands; extirpated from Guam) (ENM) EN
- Pacific imperial-pigeon, Ducula pacifica (American Samoa) LC

== Cuckoos ==
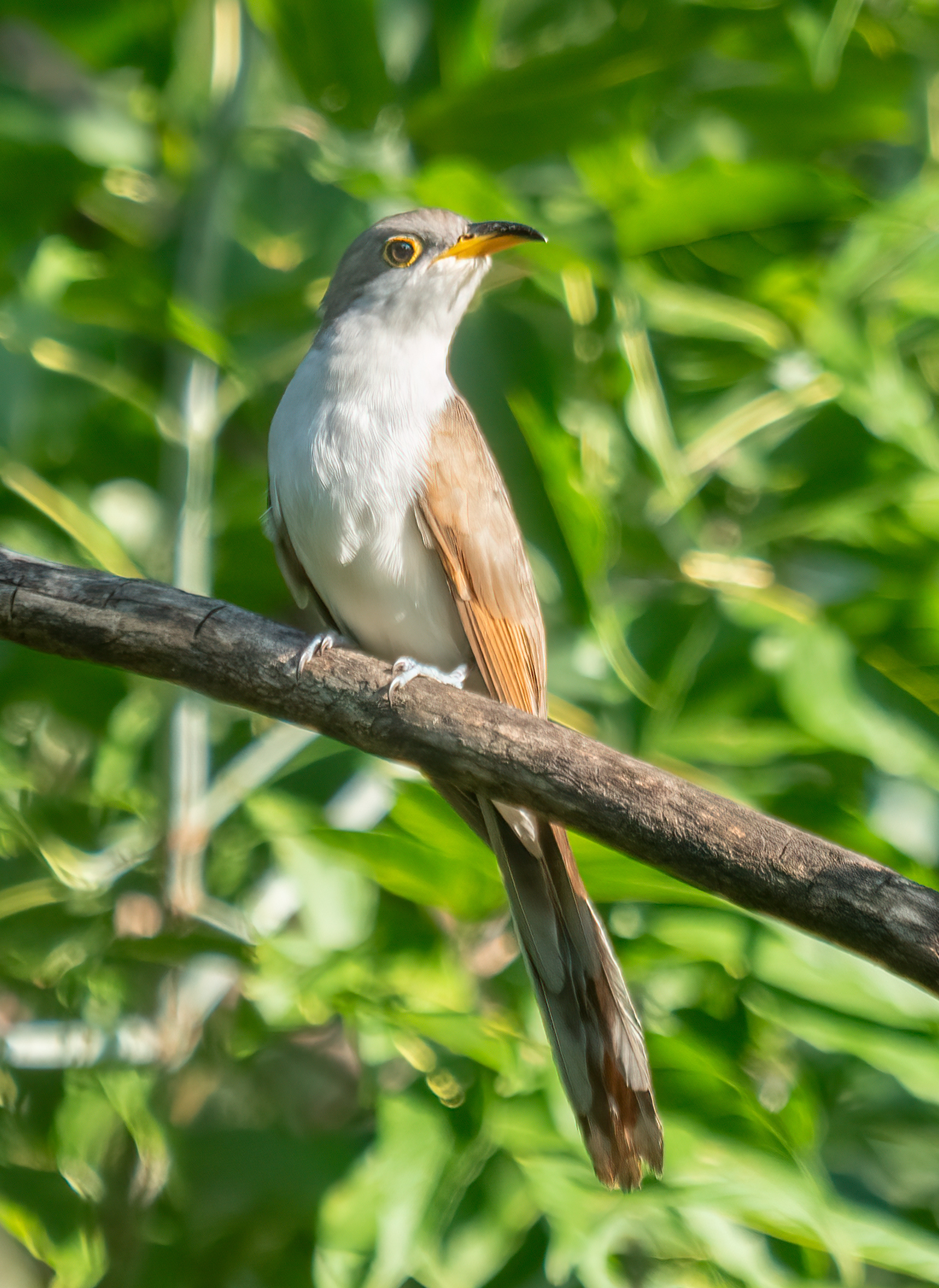
Yellow-billed cuckoo

Order: Cuculiformes Family: Cuculidae

The family Cuculidae includes cuckoos, roadrunners, and anis. These birds are of variable size with slender bodies, long tails, and strong legs.

- Greater ani, Crotophaga major (U.S. Virgin Islands) (A) LC
- Smooth-billed ani, Crotophaga ani LC
- Groove-billed ani, Crotophaga sulcirostris LC
- Greater roadrunner, Geococcyx californianus LC
- Common cuckoo, Cuculus canorus LC
- Oriental cuckoo, Cuculus optatus (C) LC
- Chestnut-winged cuckoo, Clamator coromandus (Guam) (A) LC
- Dark-billed cuckoo, Coccyzus melacoryphus (A) LC
- Yellow-billed cuckoo, Coccyzus americanus LC
- Mangrove cuckoo, Coccyzus minor LC
- Black-billed cuckoo, Coccyzus erythropthalmus LC
- Puerto Rican lizard-cuckoo, Coccyzus vielloti (Puerto Rico) (EP) LC
- Long-tailed koel, Urodynamis tailtensis (American Samoa, U.S. Minor Outlying Islands) (Note: The long-tailed koel is accidental to rare in Guam and the Northern Mariana Islands.) LC

== Nightjars and allies ==
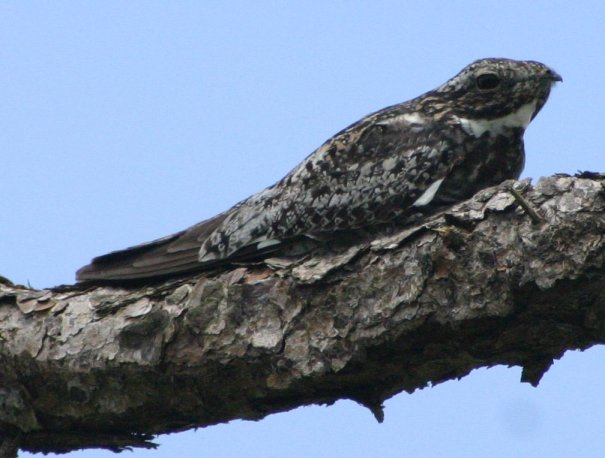
Common nighthawk

Order: Caprimulgiformes Family: Caprimulgidae

Nightjars are medium-sized nocturnal birds that usually nest on the ground. They have long wings, short legs, and very short bills. Most have small feet, of little use for walking, and long pointed wings. Their soft plumage is cryptically colored to resemble bark or leaves.

- Lesser nighthawk, Chordeiles acutipennis LC
- Common nighthawk, Chordeiles minor LC
- Antillean nighthawk, Chordeiles gundlachii LC
- Common pauraque, Nyctidromus albicollis LC
- Common poorwill, Phalaenoptilus nuttallii LC
- Chuck-will's-widow, Antrostomus carolinensis NT
- Buff-collared nightjar, Antrostomus ridgwayi LC
- Eastern whip-poor-will, Antrostomus vociferus NT
- Mexican whip-poor-will, Antrostomus arizonae LC
- Puerto Rican nightjar, Antrostomus noctitherus (Puerto Rico) (EP) EN
- White-tailed nightjar, Hydropsalis cayennensis (Puerto Rico) (A) LC
- Gray nightjar, Caprimulgus jotaka (A) LC

== Potoos ==
Order: Caprimulgiformes Family: Nyctibiidae

Potoos are a group of large near passerine birds related to the nightjars and frogmouths. These are nocturnal insectivores which lack the bristles around the mouth found in the true nightjars.

- Northern potoo, Nyctibius jamaicensis (Puerto Rico) (A) LC

== Swifts ==
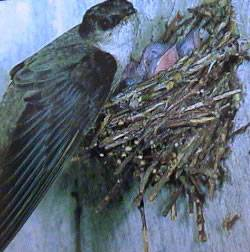
Chimney swift

Order: Apodiformes Family: Apodidae

The swifts are small birds which spend the majority of their lives flying. These birds have very short legs and never settle voluntarily on the ground, perching instead only on vertical surfaces. Many swifts have long swept-back wings which resemble a crescent or boomerang.

- Black swift, Cypseloides niger VU
- White-collared swift, Streptoprocne zonaris (C) LC
- Chimney swift, Chaetura pelagica VU
- Vaux's swift, Chaetura vauxi LC
- Short-tailed swift, Chaetura brachyura (U.S. Virgin Islands) LC
- White-throated needletail Hirundapus caudacutus (A) LC
- White-rumped swiftlet, Aerodramus spodiopygius (American Samoa) LC
- Uniform swiftlet, Aerodramus vanikorensis (Guam) LC
- Mariana swiftlet, Aerodramus bartschi (I) (Note: The Mariana swiftlet is found in Hawaii, Guam, and the Northern Mariana Islands.) EN
- Caroline Islands swiftlet, Aerodramus inquietus (Guam, Northern Mariana Islands) LC
- Common swift, Apus apus (A) LC
- Fork-tailed swift, Apus pacificus (A) LC
- Alpine swift, Tachymarptis melba (Puerto Rico) (A) LC
- White-throated swift, Aeronautes saxatalis LC
- Antillean palm-swift, Tachornis phoenicobia (A) LC

== Hummingbirds ==
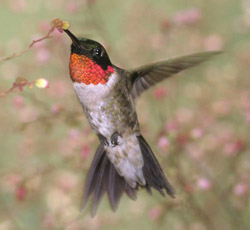
Ruby-throated hummingbird

Order: Apodiformes Family: Trochilidae

Hummingbirds are small birds capable of hovering in mid-air due to the rapid flapping of their wings. They are the only birds that can fly backwards.

- Mexican violetear, Colibri thalassinus LC
- Green-breasted mango, Anthracothorax prevostii (C) LC
- Puerto Rican mango, Anthracothorax aurulentus (Puerto Rico, U.S. Virgin Islands) LC
- Green mango, Anthracothorax viridis (Puerto Rico) (EP) LC
- Purple-throated carib, Eulampis jugularis (Puerto Rico, U.S. Virgin Islands) (A) LC
- Green-throated carib, Eulampis holosericeus (Puerto Rico, U.S. Virgin Islands) LC
- Rivoli's hummingbird, Eugenes fulgens (Not yet assessed by the IUCN)
- Plain-capped starthroat, Heliomaster constantii (C) LC
- Amethyst-throated mountain-gem, Lampornis amethystinus (A) LC
- Blue-throated mountain-gem, Lampornis clemenciae LC
- Bahama woodstar, Calliphlox evelynae (A) LC
- Lucifer hummingbird, Calothorax lucifer LC
- Ruby-throated hummingbird, Archilochus colubris LC
- Black-chinned hummingbird, Archilochus alexandri LC
- Vervain hummingbird, Mellisuga minima (Puerto Rico) (A) LC
- Anna's hummingbird, Calypte anna LC
- Costa's hummingbird, Calypte costae LC
- Calliope hummingbird, Selasphorus calliope LC
- Rufous hummingbird, Selasphorus rufus NT
- Allen's hummingbird, Selasphorus sasin LC
- Broad-tailed hummingbird, Selasphorus platycercus LC
- Bumblebee hummingbird, Selasphorus heloisa (A) LC
- Puerto Rican emerald, Riccordia maugeaus (Puerto Rico) (EP) LC
- Broad-billed hummingbird, Cynanthus latirostris LC
- White-eared Hummingbird, Basilinna leucotis LC
- Xantus's hummingbird, Basilinna xantusii (A) LC
- Antillean crested hummingbird, Orthorhyncus cristatus (Puerto Rico, U.S. Virgin Islands) LC
- Violet-crowned hummingbird, Ramosomyia violiceps LC
- Berylline hummingbird, Amazilia beryllina LC
- Cinnamon hummingbird, Amazilia rutila (A) LC
- Buff-bellied hummingbird, Amazilia yucatanensis LC

== Rails, gallinules, and coots ==
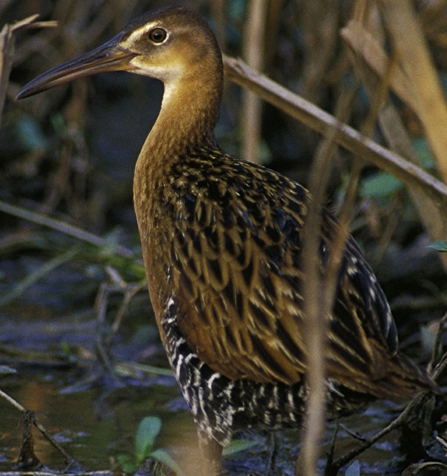
King rail

Order: Gruiformes Family: Rallidae

Rallidae is a large family of small to medium-sized birds which includes the rails, crakes, coots, and gallinules. The most typical family members occupy dense vegetation in damp environments near lakes, swamps, or rivers. In general they are shy and secretive birds, making them difficult to observe. Most species have strong legs and long toes which are well adapted to soft uneven surfaces. They tend to have short, rounded wings and to be weak fliers.

- Paint-billed crake, Neocrex erythrops (A) LC
- Spotted rail, Pardirallus maculatus (A) LC
- Rufous-necked wood-rail, Aramides axillaris (A) LC
- Ridgway's rail, Rallus obsoletus NT
- Clapper rail, Rallus crepitans LC
- King rail, Rallus elegans NT
- Virginia rail, Rallus limicola LC
- Corn crake, Crex crex (C) LC
- Sora, Porzana carolina LC
- Common gallinule, Gallinula galeata LC
- Eurasian moorhen, Gallinula chloropus (Guam, Northern Mariana Islands) LC
- Eurasian coot, Fulica atra (A) LC
- Hawaiian coot, Fulica alai (EH) VU
- American coot, Fulica americana LC
- Purple gallinule, Porphyrio martinicus LC
- Purple swamphen, Porphyrio porphyrio (I) LC
- Black-backed swamphen, Porphyrio indicus (American Samoa) (Not yet assessed by the IUCN)
- Australasian swamphen, Porphyrio melanotus (American Samoa) (Not yet assessed by the IUCN)
- White-browed crake, Poliolimnas cinereus (formerly Guam) (Ex) LC
- Yellow rail, Coturnicops noveboracensis LC
- Yellow-breasted crake, Hapalocrex flaviventer (Puerto Rico) LC
- Black rail, Laterallus jamaicensis EN
- Buff-banded rail, Gallirallus philippensis (American Samoa) LC
- Guam rail, Gallirallus owstoni (Guam, Northern Mariana Islands) (EG / ENM) CR
- Wake Island rail, Gallirallus wakensis (U.S. Minor Outlying Islands — Wake Island) (EU) (E) EX
- Laysan rail, Zapornia palmeri (EH) (E) EX
- Hawaiian rail, Zapornia sandwichensis (EH) (E) EX
- Spotless crake, Zapornia tabuensis (American Samoa) LC

== Finfoots ==
Order: Gruiformes Family: Heliornithidae

Finfoots resemble rails; they have long necks, slender bodies, broad tails, and sharp, pointed bills. Their legs and feet are brightly colored. The family has three species and only the sungrebe is found in the New World.

- Sungrebe, Heliornis fulica (A) LC

== Limpkin ==
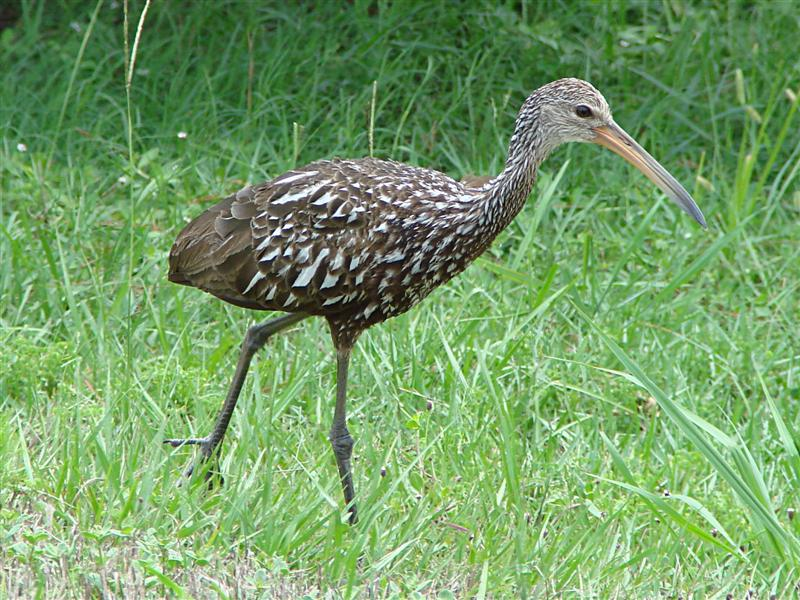
Limpkin

Order: Gruiformes Family: Aramidae

The limpkin is an odd bird that looks like a large rail, but is skeletally closer to the cranes. It is found in marshes with some trees or scrub in the Caribbean, South America, and southern Florida.

- Limpkin, Aramus guarauna LC

== Cranes ==
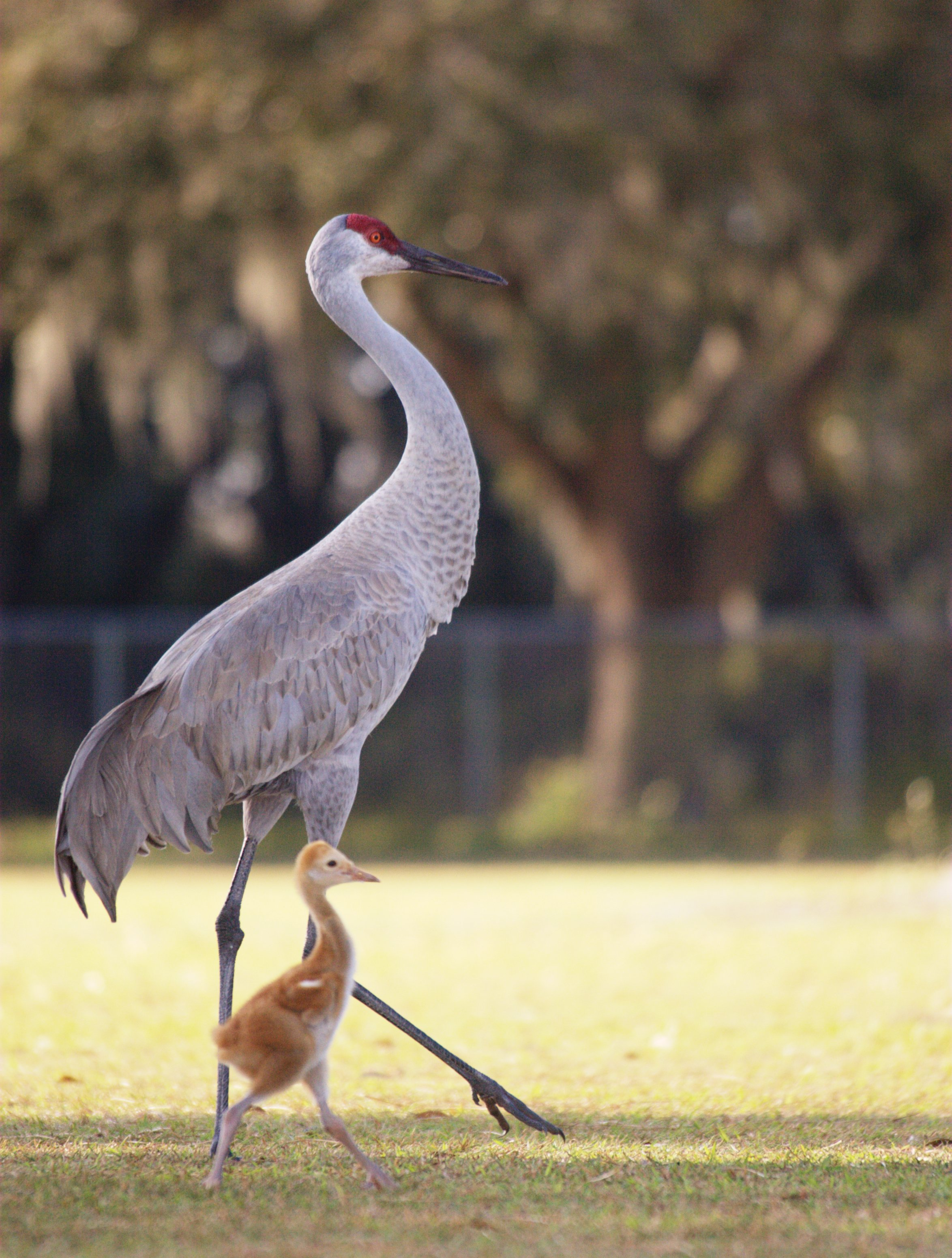
Sandhill cranes

Order: Gruiformes Family: Gruidae

Cranes are large, long-legged, and long-necked birds. Unlike the similar-looking but unrelated herons, cranes fly with necks outstretched, not pulled back. Most have elaborate and noisy courting displays or "dances".

- Sandhill crane, Antigone canadensis LC
- Common crane, Grus grus (C) LC
- Whooping crane, Grus americana EN
- Hooded crane, Grus monacha (A) VU

== Thick-knees ==
Order: Charadriiformes Family: Burhinidae

The thick-knees are a group of waders found worldwide within the tropical zone, with some species also breeding in temperate Europe and Australia. They are medium to large waders with strong black or yellow-black bills, large yellow eyes, and cryptic plumage. Despite being classed as waders, most species have a preference for arid or semi-arid habitats.

- Double-striped thick-knee, Burhinus bistriatus (A) LC

== Stilts and avocets ==
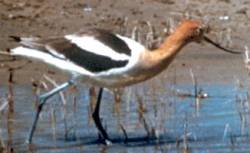
American avocet

Order: Charadriiformes Family: Recurvirostridae

Recurvirostridae is a family of large wading birds which includes the avocets and stilts. The avocets have long legs and long up-curved bills. The stilts have extremely long legs and long, thin, straight bills.

- Black-winged stilt, Himantopus himantopus (Note: The black-winged stilt occurs regularly in the Northern Mariana Islands.) LC
- Black-necked stilt, Himantopus mexicanus LC
- American avocet, Recurvirostra americana LC

== Oystercatchers ==
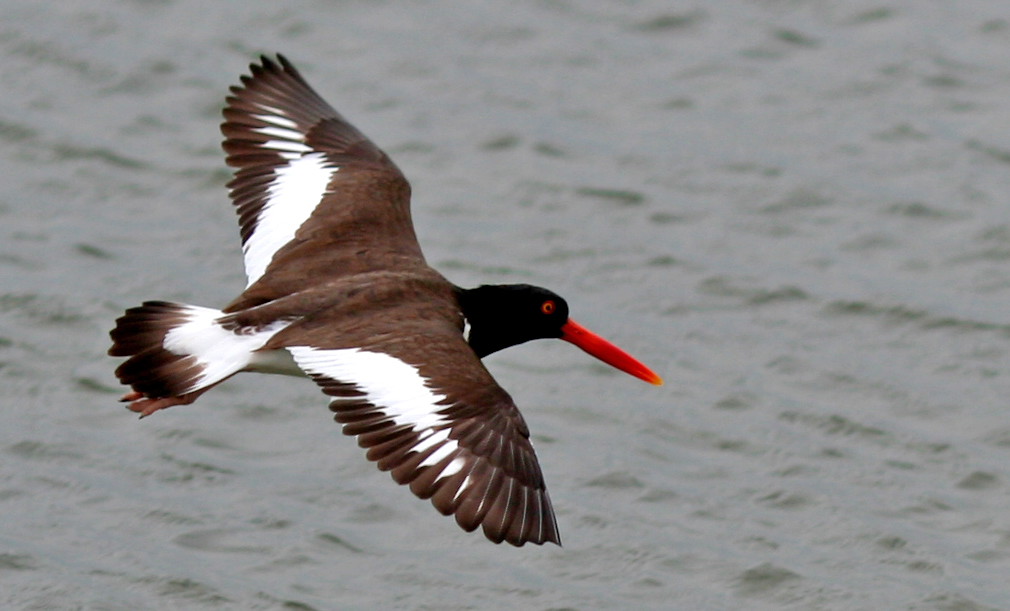
American oystercatcher

Order: Charadriiformes Family: Haematopodidae

The oystercatchers are large, obvious, and noisy plover-like birds, with strong bills used for smashing or prying open molluscs.

- Eurasian oystercatcher, Haematopus ostralegus (A) NT
- American oystercatcher, Haematopus palliatus LC
- Black oystercatcher, Haematopus bachmani LC

== Plovers and lapwings ==
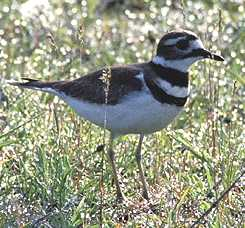
Killdeer

Order: Charadriiformes Family: Charadriidae

The family Charadriidae includes the plovers, dotterels, and lapwings. They are small to medium-sized birds with compact bodies, short thick necks, and long, usually pointed, wings. They are found in open country worldwide, mostly in habitats near water.

- Northern lapwing, Vanellus vanellus (C) NT
- Masked lapwing, Vanellus miles (American Samoa) (A) LC
- Black-bellied plover, Pluvialis squatarola LC
- European golden-plover, Pluvialis apricaria (C) LC
- American golden-plover, Pluvialis dominica LC
- Pacific golden-plover, Pluvialis fulva LC
- Eurasian dotterel, Charadrius morinellus (C) LC
- Killdeer, Charadrius vociferus NT
- Common ringed plover, Charadrius hiaticula LC
- Semipalmated plover, Charadrius semipalmatus LC
- Piping plover, Charadrius melodus NT
- Little ringed plover, Charadrius dubius (A) LC
- Lesser sand-plover, Charadrius mongolus LC
- Greater sand-plover, Charadrius leschenaultii (A) LC
- Wilson's plover, Charadrius wilsonia LC
- Collared plover, Charadrius collaris (A) LC
- Kentish plover, Charadrius alexandrinus (Guam, Northern Mariana Islands) LC
- Snowy plover, Charadrius nivosus NT
- Mountain plover, Charadrius montanus NT

== Jacanas ==
Order: Charadriiformes Family: Jacanidae

The jacanas are a family of waders found worldwide within the tropical zone. They are identifiable by their huge feet and claws which enable them to walk on floating vegetation in the shallow lakes that are their preferred habitat.

- Pheasant-tailed jacana, Hydrophasianus chirurgus (Northern Mariana Islands) (A) LC
- Northern jacana, Jacana spinosa (C) LC

== Sandpipers and allies ==
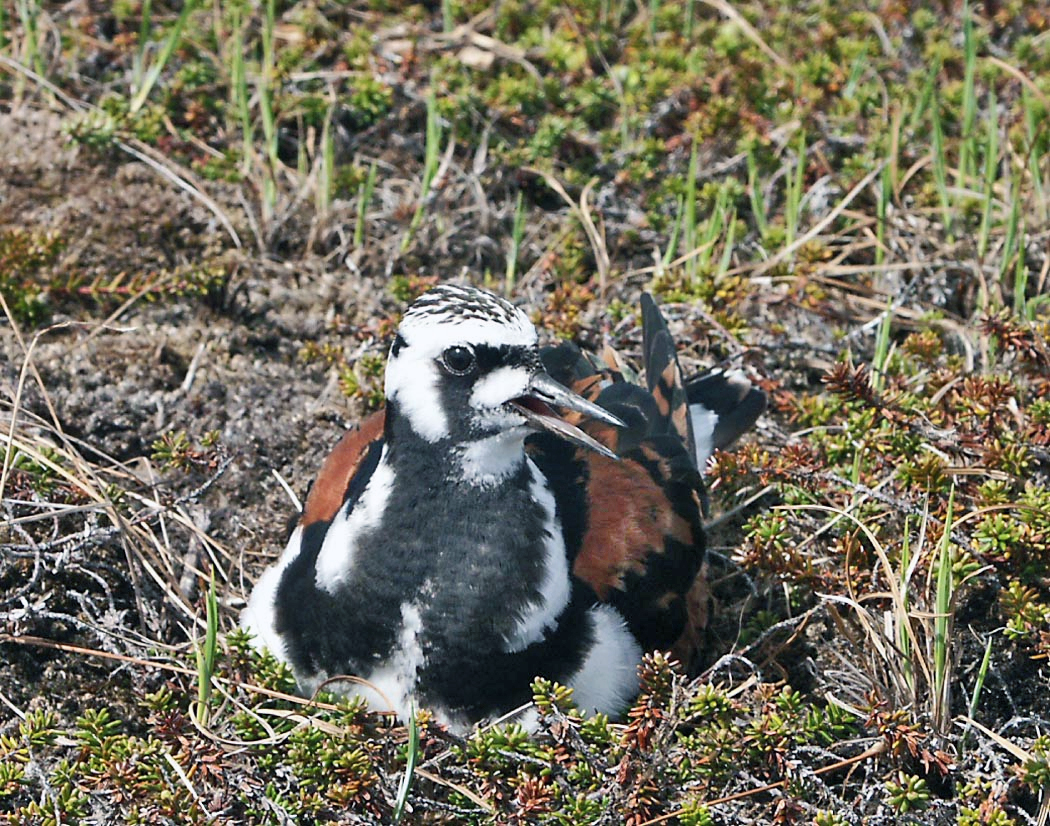
Ruddy turnstone

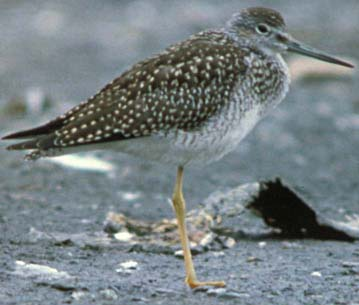
Greater yellowlegs

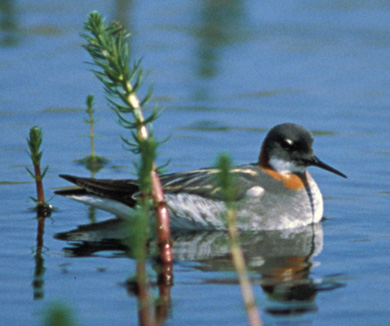
Red-necked phalarope

Order: Charadriiformes Family: Scolopacidae

Scolopacidae is a large diverse family of small to medium-sized shorebirds including the sandpipers, curlews, godwits, shanks, tattlers, woodcocks, snipes, dowitchers, and phalaropes. The majority of these species eat small invertebrates picked out of the mud or soil. Different lengths of legs and bills enable multiple species to feed in the same habitat, particularly on the coast, without direct competition for food.

- Upland sandpiper, Bartramia longicauda LC
- Bristle-thighed curlew, Numenius tahitiensis NT
- Whimbrel, Numenius phaeopus LC
- Little curlew, Numenius minutus (A) LC
- Eskimo curlew, Numenius borealis (Possibly extinct) CR
- Long-billed curlew, Numenius americanus LC
- Far Eastern curlew, Numenius madagascariensis (C) EN
- Slender-billed curlew, Numenius tenuirostris (A) CR
- Eurasian curlew, Numenius arquata (C) NT
- Bar-tailed godwit, Limosa lapponica NT
- Black-tailed godwit, Limosa limosa NT
- Hudsonian godwit, Limosa haemastica VU
- Marbled godwit, Limosa fedoa VU
- Ruddy turnstone, Arenaria interpres LC
- Black turnstone, Arenaria melanocephala LC
- Great knot, Calidris tenuirostris (C) EN
- Red knot, Calidris canutus LC
- Surfbird, Calidris virgata LC
- Ruff, Calidris pugnax LC
- Broad-billed sandpiper, Limicola falcinellus (C) VU
- Sharp-tailed sandpiper, Calidris acuminata LC
- Stilt sandpiper, Calidris himantopus NT
- Curlew sandpiper, Calidris ferruginea NT
- Temminck's stint, Calidris temminckii (A) LC
- Long-toed stint, Calidris subminuta LC
- Spoon-billed sandpiper, Calidris pygmaea (C) CR
- Red-necked stint, Calidris ruficollis NT
- Sanderling, Calidris alba LC
- Dunlin, Calidris alpina NT
- Rock sandpiper, Calidris ptilocnemis LC
- Purple sandpiper, Calidris maritima LC
- Baird's sandpiper, Calidris bairdii LC
- Little stint, Calidris minuta (C) LC
- Least sandpiper, Calidris minutilla NT
- White-rumped sandpiper, Calidris fuscicollis VU
- Buff-breasted sandpiper, Calidris subruficollis VU
- Pectoral sandpiper, Calidris melanotos LC
- Semipalmated sandpiper, Calidris pusilla NT
- Western sandpiper, Calidris mauri LC
- Short-billed dowitcher, Limnodromus griseus VU
- Long-billed dowitcher, Limnodromus scolopaceus NT
- Jack snipe, Lymnocryptes minimus (C) LC
- Eurasian woodcock, Scolopax rusticola (A) LC
- American woodcock, Scolopax minor LC
- Latham's snipe, Gallinago hardwickii (Guam) (A) LC
- Solitary snipe, Gallinago solitaria (A) LC
- Pin-tailed snipe, Gallinago stenura (A) LC
- Common snipe, Gallinago gallinago LC
- Wilson's snipe, Gallinago delicata LC
- Swinhoe's snipe, Gallinago megala (Guam, Northern Mariana Islands) LC
- Terek sandpiper, Xenus cinereus LC
- Common sandpiper, Actitis hypoleucos LC
- Spotted sandpiper, Actitis macularius LC
- Green sandpiper, Tringa ochropus (C) LC
- Solitary sandpiper, Tringa solitaria LC
- Gray-tailed tattler, Tringa brevipes NT
- Wandering tattler, Tringa incana LC
- Lesser yellowlegs, Tringa flavipes VU
- Willet, Tringa semipalmata LC
- Spotted redshank, Tringa erythropus (C) LC
- Common greenshank, Tringa nebularia LC
- Greater yellowlegs, Tringa melanoleuca NT
- Common redshank, Tringa totanus (A) LC
- Wood sandpiper, Tringa glareola LC
- Marsh sandpiper, Tringa stagnatilis (A) LC
- Wilson's phalarope, Phalaropus tricolor LC
- Red-necked phalarope, Phalaropus lobatus LC
- Red phalarope, Phalaropus fulicarius LC

== Pratincoles and coursers ==
Order: Charadriiformes Family: Glareolidae

The pratincoles have short legs, very long pointed wings, and long forked tails. Their most unusual feature for birds classed as waders is that they typically hunt their insect prey on the wing like swallows, although they can also feed on the ground. Their short bills are an adaptation to aerial feeding. Their flight is fast and graceful like that of a swallow or a tern, with many twists and turns to pursue their prey.

- Oriental pratincole, Glareola maldivarum (A) LC

== Skuas and jaegers ==
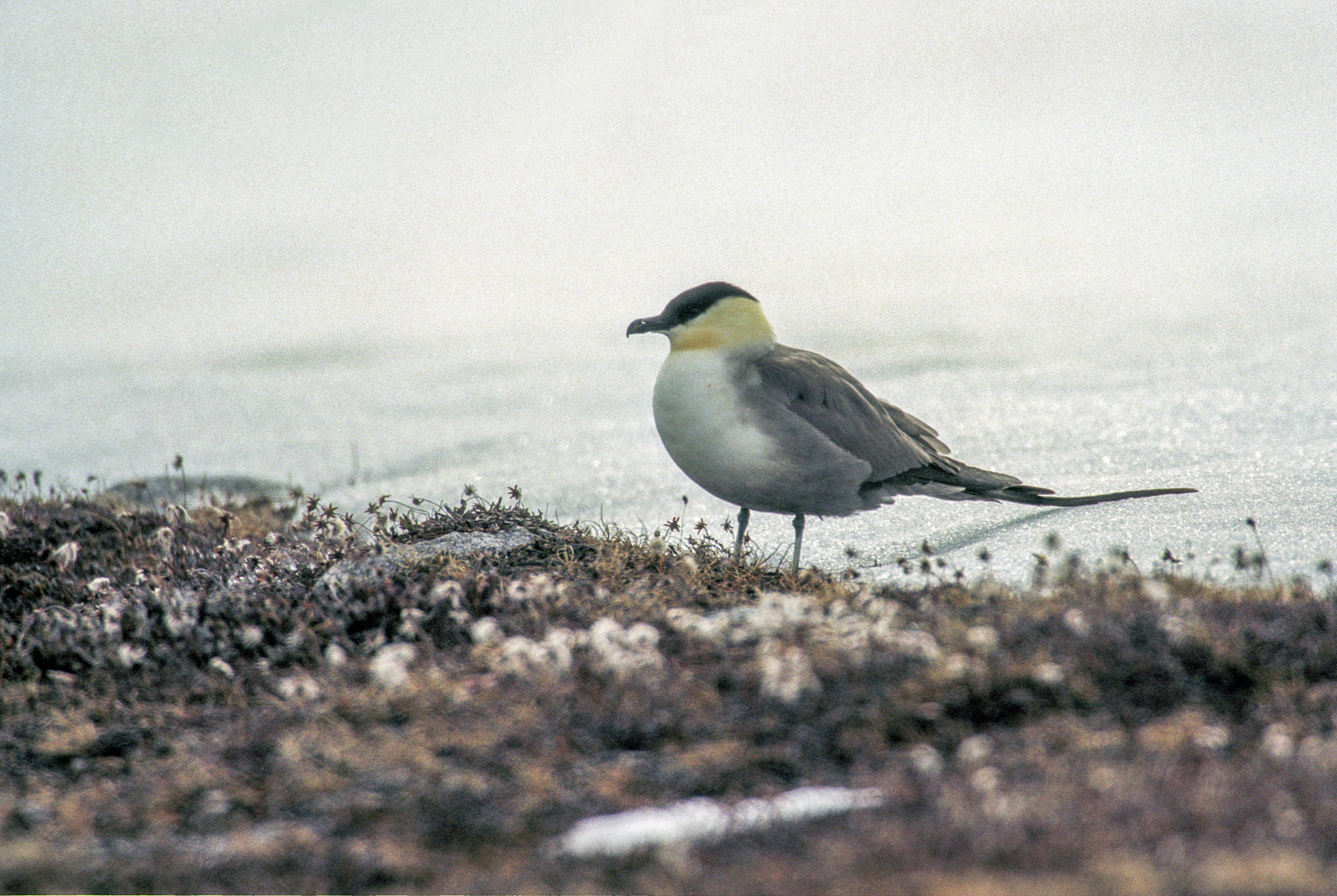
Long-tailed jaeger

Order: Charadriiformes Family: Stercorariidae

Skuas are in general medium to large birds, typically with gray or brown plumage, often with white markings on the wings. They have longish bills with hooked tips and webbed feet with sharp claws. They look like large dark gulls, but have a fleshy cere above the upper mandible. They are strong, acrobatic fliers.

- Great skua, Stercorarius skua LC
- South polar skua, Stercorarius maccormicki LC
- Pomarine jaeger, Stercorarius pomarinus LC
- Parasitic jaeger, Stercorarius parasiticus LC
- Long-tailed jaeger, Stercorarius longicaudus LC

== Auks, murres, and puffins ==
Order: Charadriiformes Family: Alcidae

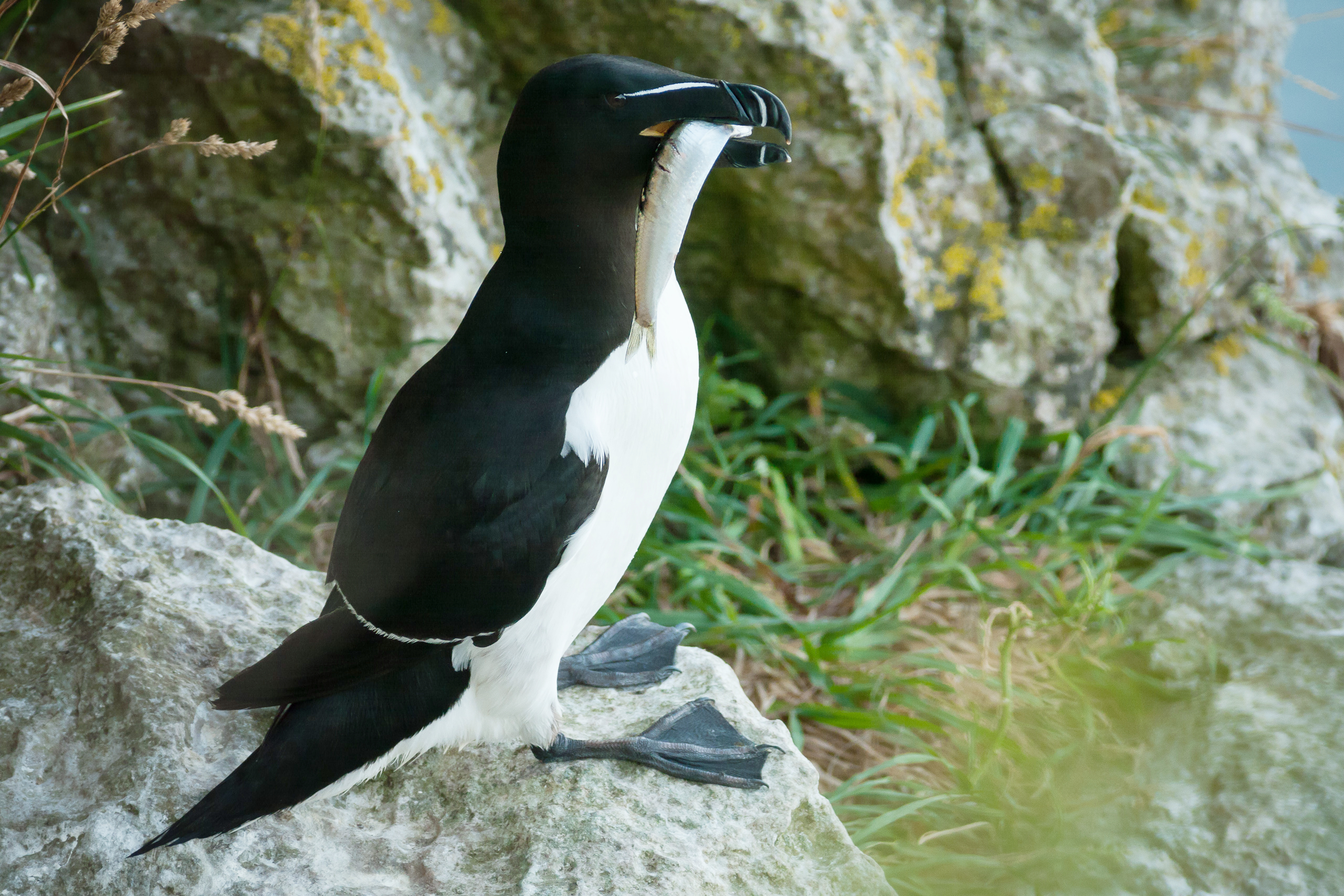
Razorbill

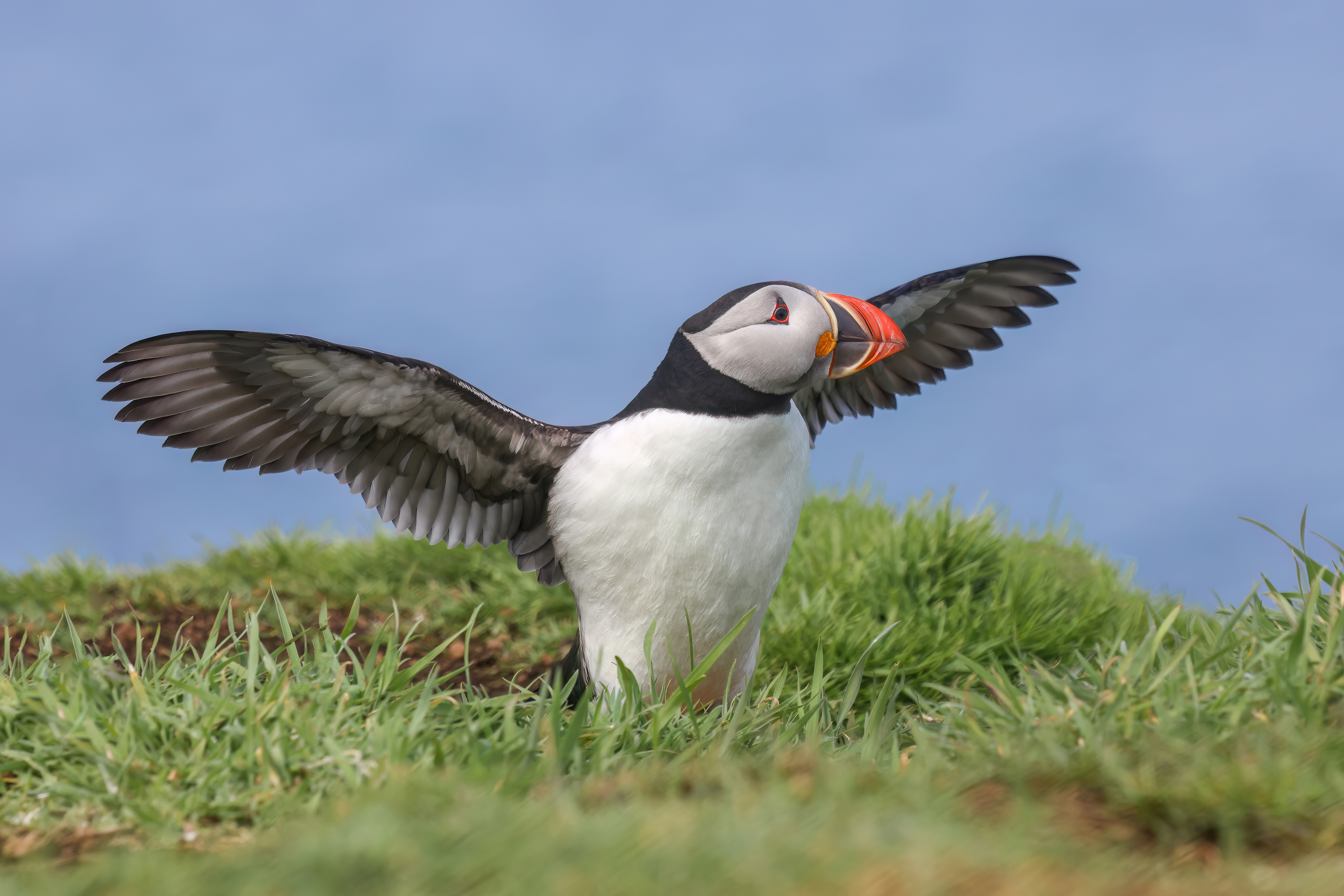
Atlantic puffin

Alcids are superficially similar to penguins due to their black-and-white colors, their upright posture, and some of their habits. However, they are only distantly related to the penguins and are able to fly. Auks live on the open sea, only deliberately coming ashore to nest.

- Dovekie, Alle alle LC
- Common murre, Uria aalge LC
- Thick-billed murre, Uria lomvia LC
- Razorbill, Alca torda NT
- Great auk, Pinguinus impennis (E) EX
- Black guillemot, Cepphus grylle LC
- Pigeon guillemot, Cepphus columba LC
- Long-billed murrelet, Brachyramphus perdix (A) NT
- Marbled murrelet, Brachyramphus marmoratus EN
- Kittlitz's murrelet, Brachyramphus brevirostris NT
- Scripps's murrelet, Synthliboramphus scrippsi VU
- Guadalupe murrelet, Synthliboramphus hypoleucus EN
- Craveri's murrelet, Synthliboramphus craveri VU
- Ancient murrelet, Synthliboramphus antiquus LC
- Japanese murrelet, Synthliboramphus wumizusume (U.S. Minor Outlying Islands) (A) VU
- Cassin's auklet, Ptychoramphus aleuticus NT
- Parakeet auklet, Aethia psittacula LC
- Least auklet, Aethia pusilla LC
- Whiskered auklet, Aethia pygmaea LC
- Crested auklet, Aethia cristatella LC
- Rhinoceros auklet, Cerorhinca monocerata LC
- Atlantic puffin, Fratercula arctica VU
- Horned puffin, Fratercula corniculata LC
- Tufted puffin, Fratercula cirrhata LC

== Gulls, terns, and skimmers ==
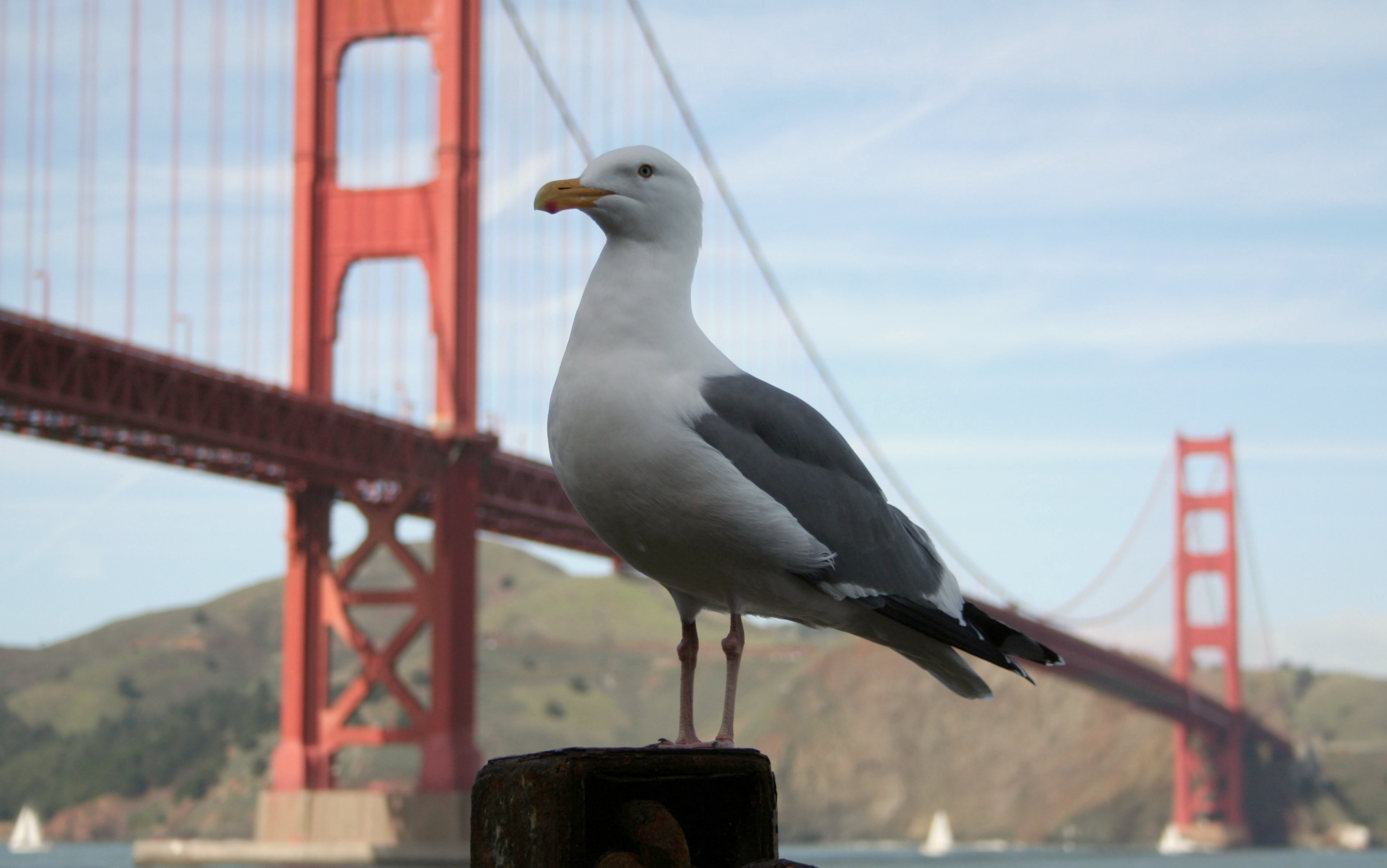
A western gull in front of the Golden Gate Bridge in San Francisco

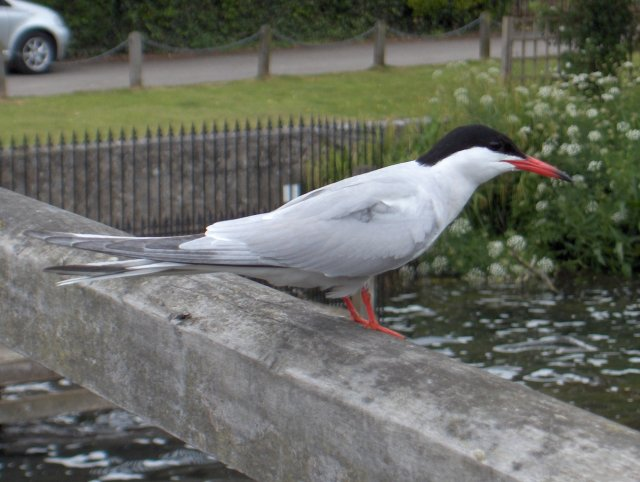
Common tern

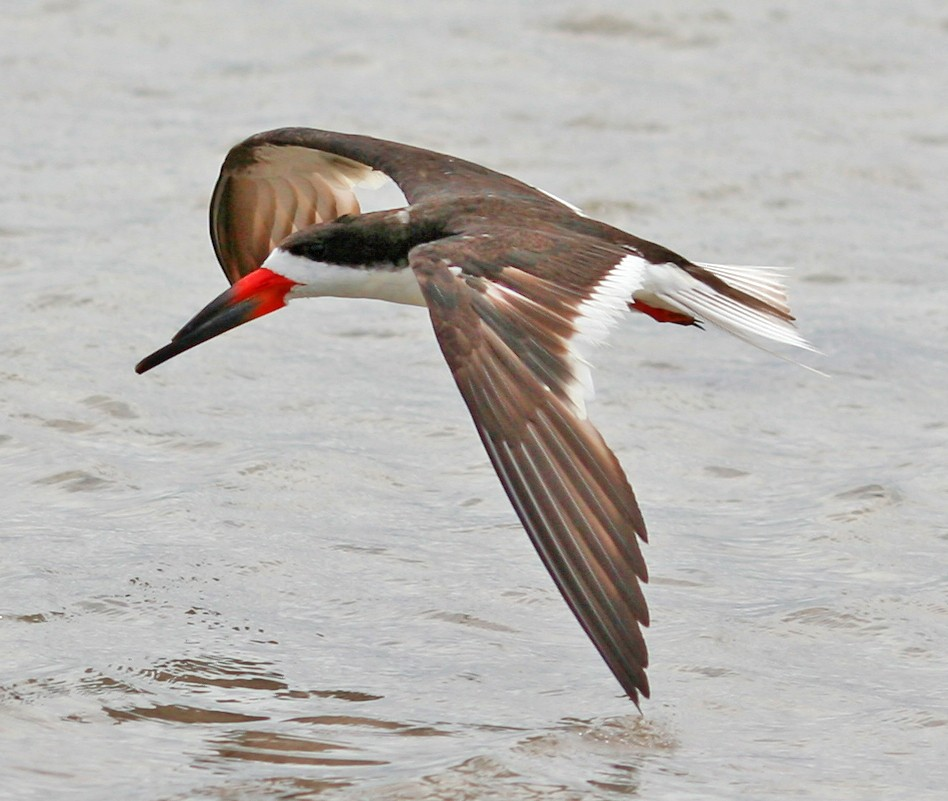
Black skimmer

Order: Charadriiformes Family: Laridae

Laridae is a family of medium to large seabirds and includes gulls, terns, and skimmers. Gulls are typically gray or white, often with black markings on the head or wings. They have stout, longish bills and webbed feet. Terns are a group of generally medium to large seabirds typically with grey or white plumage, often with black markings on the head. Most terns hunt fish by diving but some pick insects off the surface of fresh water. Terns are generally long-lived birds, with several species known to live in excess of 30 years. Skimmers are a small family of tropical tern-like birds. They have an elongated lower mandible which they use to feed by flying low over the water surface and skimming the water for small fish.

- Swallow-tailed gull, Creagrus furcatus (A) LC
- Black-legged kittiwake, Rissa tridactyla VU
- Red-legged kittiwake, Rissa brevirostris VU
- Ivory gull, Pagophila eburnea NT
- Sabine's gull, Xema sabini LC
- Bonaparte's gull, Chroicocephalus philadelphia LC
- Silver gull, Chroicocephalus novaehollandiae (U.S. Minor Outlying Islands) (A) LC
- Gray-hooded gull, Chroicocephalus cirrocephalus (A) LC
- Black-headed gull, Chroicocephalus ridibundus LC
- Little gull, Hydrocoloeus minutus LC
- Ross's gull, Rhodostethia rosea LC
- Laughing gull, Leucophaeus atricilla LC
- Franklin's gull, Leucophaeus pipixcan LC
- Pallas's gull, Ichthyaetus ichthyaetus LC
- Belcher's gull, Larus belcheri (A) LC
- Black-tailed gull, Larus crassirostris (C) LC
- Heermann's gull, Larus heermanni NT
- Common gull, Larus canus LC
- Short-billed gull, Larus brachyrhynchus
- Ring-billed gull, Larus delawarensis LC
- Western gull, Larus occidentalis LC
- Yellow-footed gull, Larus livens LC
- California gull, Larus californicus LC
- American herring gull, Larus smithsonianus LC
- Vega gull, Larus vegae LC
- European herring gull, Larus argentatus (C) LC
- Yellow-legged gull, Larus cachinnans (C) LC
- Iceland gull, Larus glaucoides LC
- Lesser black-backed gull, Larus fuscus LC
- Slaty-backed gull, Larus schistisagus LC
- Glaucous-winged gull, Larus glaucescens LC
- Glaucous gull, Larus hyperboreus LC
- Great black-backed gull, Larus marinus LC
- Kelp gull, Larus dominicanus (C) LC
- Brown noddy, Anous stolidus LC
- Black noddy, Anous minutus LC
- Blue-gray noddy, Anous ceruleus LC
- White tern, Gygis alba LC
- Sooty tern, Onychoprion fuscatus LC
- Gray-backed tern, Onychoprion lunatus (American Samoa, Northern Mariana Islands, U.S. Minor Outlying Islands) LC
- Bridled tern, Onychoprion anaethetus LC
- Aleutian tern, Onychoprion aleuticus VU
- Little tern, Sternula albifrons (C) LC
- Least tern, Sternula antillarum LC
- Large-billed tern, Phaetusa simplex (A) LC
- Gull-billed tern, Gelochelidon nilotica LC
- Caspian tern, Hydroprogne caspia LC
- Black tern, Chlidonias niger LC
- White-winged tern, Chlidonias leucopterus (C) LC
- Whiskered tern, Chlidonias hybrida (A) LC
- Roseate tern, Sterna dougallii LC
- Black-naped tern, Sterna sumatrana (American Samoa, Guam, Northern Mariana Islands) (A) LC
- Common tern, Sterna hirundo LC
- Arctic tern, Sterna paradisaea LC
- Forster's tern, Sterna forsteri LC
- Royal tern, Thalasseus maximus LC
- Great crested tern, Thalasseus bergii (A) LC
- Sandwich tern, Sterna sandvicensis LC
- Elegant tern, Thalasseus elegans NT
- Black skimmer, Rynchops niger LC

== Tropicbirds ==
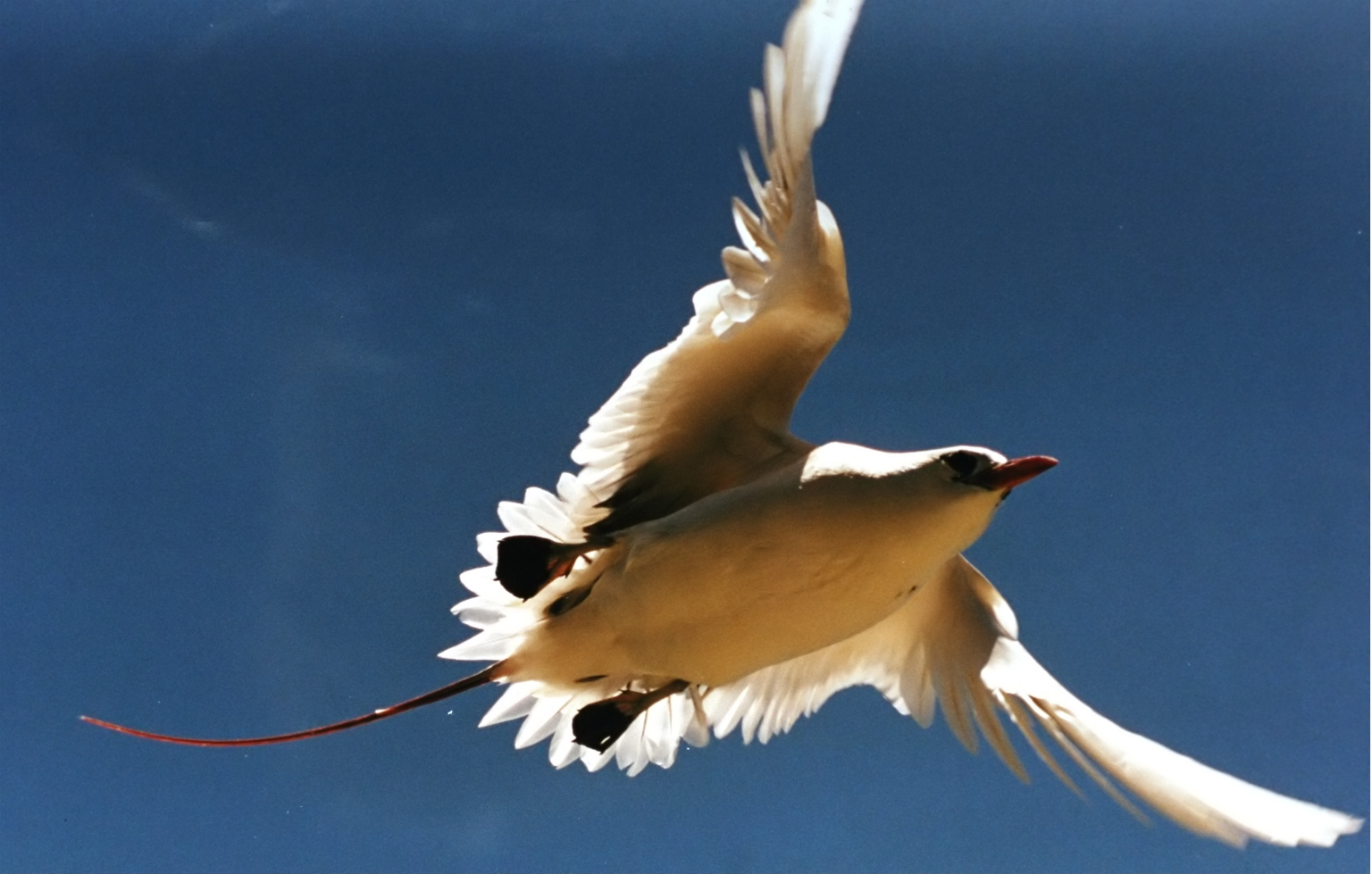
Red-tailed tropicbird

Order: Phaethontiformes Family: Phaethontidae

Tropicbirds are slender white birds of tropical oceans, with exceptionally long central tail feathers. Their long wings have black markings, as does the head.

- White-tailed tropicbird, Phaethon lepturus LC
- Red-billed tropicbird, Phaethon aethereus LC
- Red-tailed tropicbird, Phaethon rubricauda LC

== Loons ==
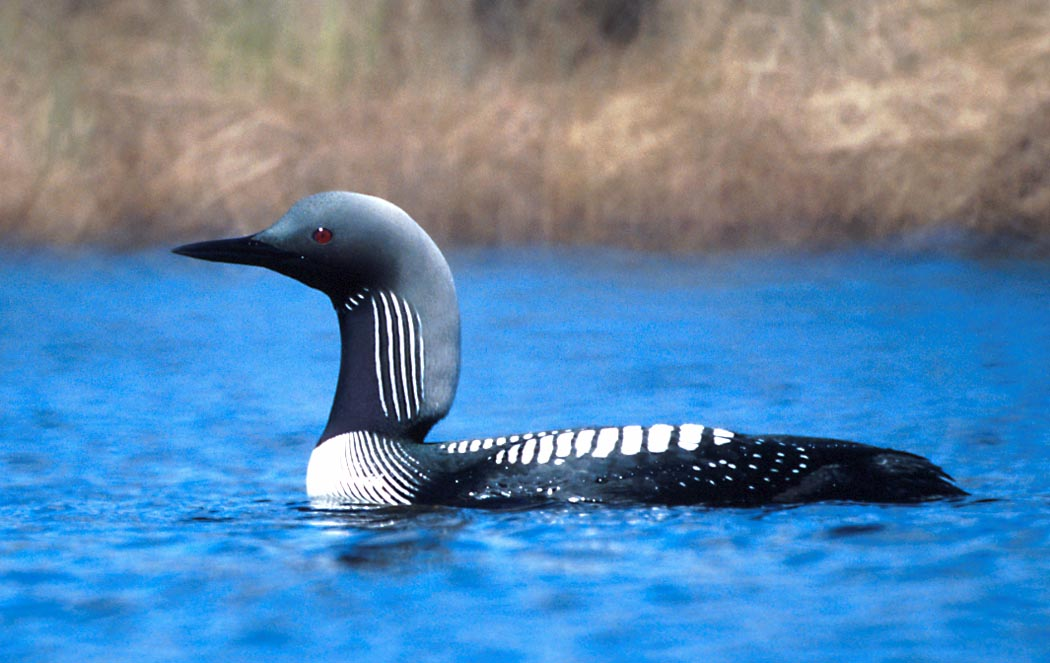
Pacific loon

Order: Gaviiformes Family: Gaviidae

Loons are aquatic birds, the size of a large duck, to which they are unrelated. Their plumage is largely gray or black, and they have spear-shaped bills. Loons swim well and fly adequately, but are almost hopeless on land, because their legs are placed towards the rear of the body.

- Red-throated loon, Gavia stellata LC
- Arctic loon, Gavia arctica LC
- Pacific loon, Gavia pacifica LC
- Common loon, Gavia immer LC
- Yellow-billed loon, Gavia adamsii NT

== Albatrosses ==
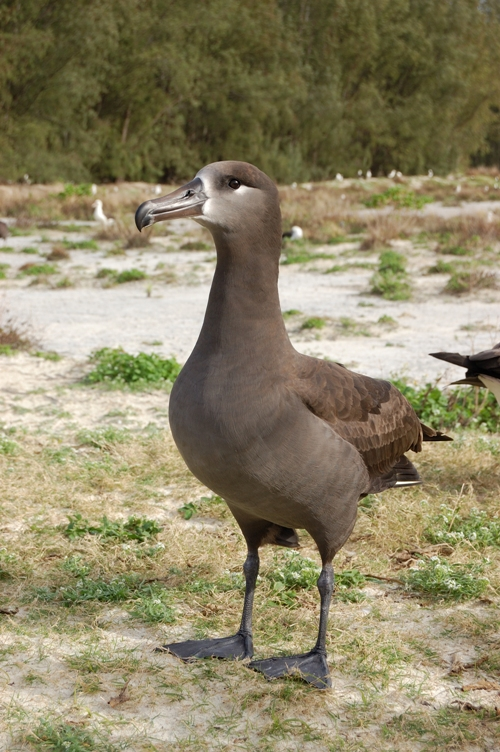
Black-footed albatross

Order: Procellariiformes Family: Diomedeidae

The albatrosses are among the largest of flying birds, and the great albatrosses of the genus Diomedea have the largest wingspans of any extant birds.

- Yellow-nosed albatross, Thalassar chlororhynchus (C) LC
- White-capped albatross, Thalassarche cauta (C) NT
- Chatham albatross, Thalassarche eremita (A) VU
- Salvin's albatross, Thalassarche salvini (A) VU
- Black-browed albatross, Thalassarche melanophris (A) LC
- Light-mantled albatross, Phoebetria palpebrata (A) NT
- Wandering albatross, Diomedea exulans (A) VU
- Laysan albatross, Phoebastria immutabilis NT
- Black-footed albatross, Phoebastria nigripes NT
- Short-tailed albatross, Phoebastria albatrus VU

== Southern storm-petrels ==
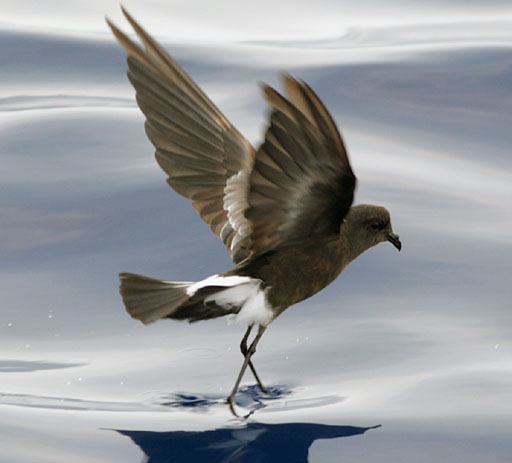
Wilson's storm-petrel

Order: Procellariiformes Family: Oceanitidae

The storm-petrels are the smallest seabirds, relatives of the petrels, feeding on planktonic crustaceans and small fish picked from the surface, typically while hovering. The flight is fluttering and sometimes bat-like. Until 2018, these species were included with the other storm-petrels in family Hydrobatidae.

- Wilson's storm-petrel, Oceanites oceanicus LC
- White-faced storm-petrel, Pelagodroma marina LC
- Black-bellied storm-petrel, Fregetta tropica (A) LC
- Polynesian storm-petrel, Nesofregetta fuliginosa (American Samoa) (Note: The Polynesian storm-petrel is accidental to rare in the U.S. Minor Outlying Islands.) EN

== Northern storm-petrels ==
Order: Procellariiformes Family: Hydrobatidae

Though the members of the family are similar in many respects to the southern storm-petrels, including their general appearance and habits, there are enough genetic differences to warrant their placement in a separate family.

- European storm-petrel, Hydrobates pelagicus (C) LC
- Fork-tailed storm-petrel, Hydrobates furcatus LC
- Ringed storm-petrel, Hydrobates hornbyi (A) NT
- Swinhoe's storm-petrel, Hydrobates monorhis (A) NT
- Leach's storm-petrel, Hydrobates leucorhous VU
- Townsend's storm-petrel, Hydrobates socorroensis EN
- Ashy storm-petrel, Hydrobates homochroa EN
- Band-rumped storm-petrel, Hydrobates castro LC
- Wedge-rumped storm-petrel, Hydrobates tethys (C) LC
- Black storm-petrel, Hydrobates melania LC
- Tristram's storm-petrel, Hydrobates tristrami LC
- Least storm-petrel, Hydrobates microsoma VU
- Matsudaira's storm-petrel, Oceanodroma matsudairae (Guam, Northern Mariana Islands) VU

== Shearwaters and petrels ==
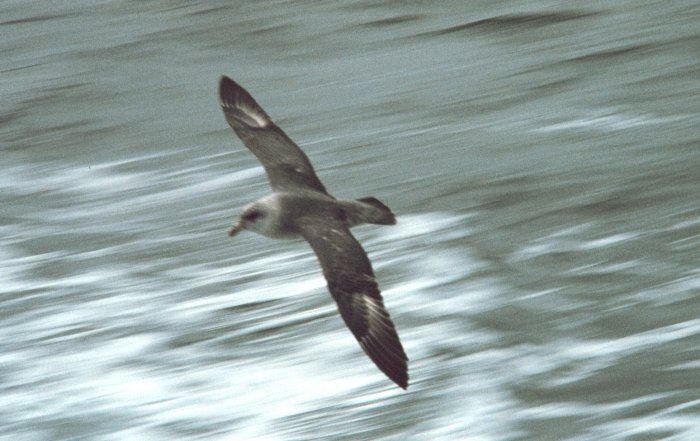
Northern fulmar

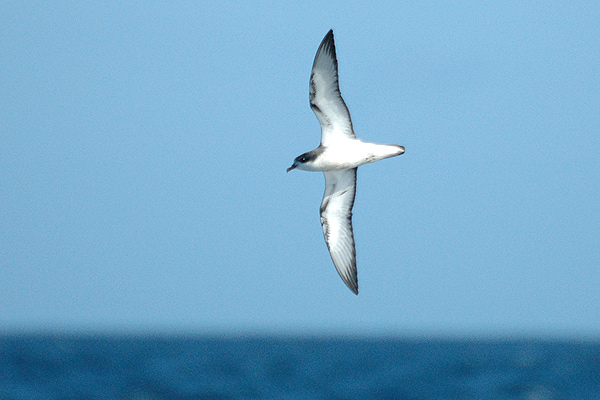
Cook's petrel

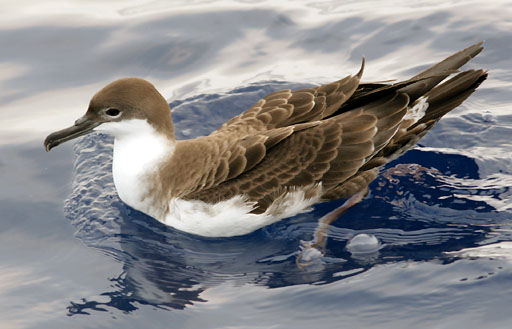
Great shearwater

Order: Procellariiformes Family: Procellariidae

The procellariids are the main group of medium-sized "true petrels", characterized by united nostrils with medium septum and a long outer functional primary.

- Northern giant petrel, Macronectes halli (A) LC
- Northern fulmar, Fulmarus glacialis LC
- Gray-faced petrel, Pterodroma gouldi (A) LC
- Providence petrel, Pterodroma solandri (C) VU
- Kermadec petrel, Pterodroma neglecta (C) LC
- Trindade petrel, Pterodroma arminjoniana VU
- Herald petrel, Pterodroma heraldica (C) LC
- Murphy's petrel, Pterodroma ultima LC
- Mottled petrel, Pterodroma inexpectata NT
- Bermuda petrel, Pterodroma cahow EN
- Black-capped petrel, Pterodroma hasitata EN
- Juan Fernandez petrel, Pterodroma externa VU
- Hawaiian petrel, Pterodroma sandwichensis VU
- White-necked petrel, Pterodroma cervicalis VU
- Bonin petrel, Pterodroma hypoleuca LC
- Black-winged petrel, Pterodroma nigripennis LC
- Fea's petrel, Pterodroma feae NT
- Zino's petrel, Pterodroma madeira (A) VU
- Cook's petrel, Pterodroma cookii VU
- Gould's petrel, Pterodroma leucoptera (American Samoa) VU
- Collared petrel, Pterodroma brevipes (American Samoa) VU
- Stejneger's petrel, Pterodroma longirostris (C) VU
- Phoenix petrel, Pterodroma alba (American Samoa, U.S. Minor Outlying Islands) EN
- Tahiti petrel, Pseudobulweria rostrata (A) NT
- Bulwer's petrel, Bulweria bulwerii LC
- Jouanin's petrel, Bulweria fallax (A) NT
- White-chinned petrel, Procellaria aequinoctialis (A) VU
- Parkinson's petrel, Procellaria parkinsoni (A) VU
- Streaked shearwater, Calonectris leucomelas (C) NT
- Cory's shearwater, Calonectris diomedea LC
- Cape Verde shearwater, Calonectris edwardsii (A) NT
- Wedge-tailed shearwater, Ardenna pacifica LC
- Buller's shearwater, Ardenna bulleri VU
- Short-tailed shearwater, Ardenna tenuirostris LC
- Sooty shearwater, Ardenna grisea NT
- Great shearwater, Ardenna gravis LC
- Pink-footed shearwater, Ardenna creatopus VU
- Flesh-footed shearwater, Ardenna carneipes LC
- Christmas shearwater, Puffinus nativitatis NT
- Manx shearwater, Puffinus puffinus LC
- Townsend's shearwater, Puffinus auricularis CR
- Newell's shearwater, Puffinus newelli CR
- Bryan's shearwater, Puffinus bryani (A) CR
- Black-vented shearwater, Puffinus opisthomelas NT
- Little shearwater, Puffinus assimilis (U.S. Minor Outlying Islands) LC
- Sargasso shearwater, Puffinus lherminieri LC
- Tropical shearwater, Puffinus bailloni (American Samoa, Guam, Northern Mariana Islands, U.S. Minor Outlying Islands) LC
- Barolo shearwater, Puffinus baroli (A) (Not yet assessed by the IUCN)

== Storks ==
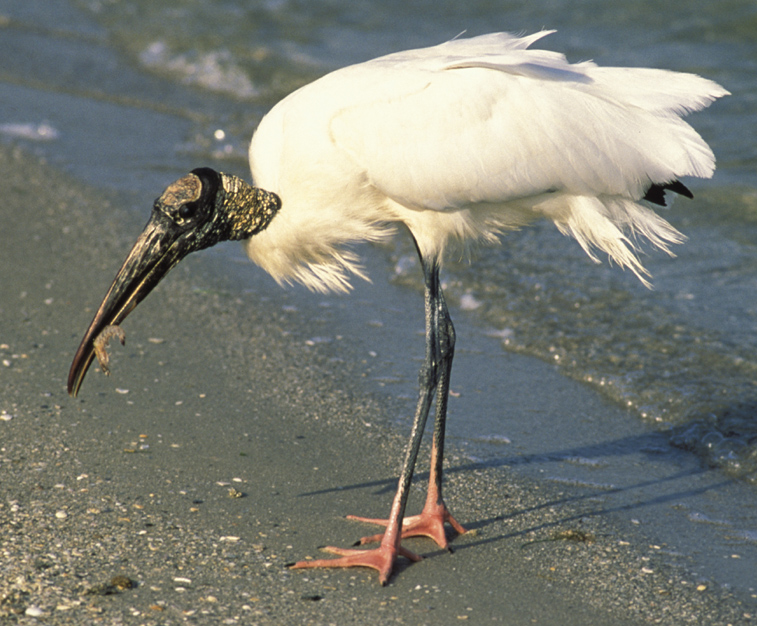
Wood stork

Order: Ciconiiformes Family: Ciconiidae

Storks are large, heavy, long-legged, long-necked wading birds with long stout bills and wide wingspans. They lack the powder down that other wading birds such as herons, spoonbills, and ibises use to clean off fish slime. Storks lack a pharynx and are mute.

- Jabiru, Jabiru mycteria (C) LC
- Wood stork, Mycteria americana LC

== Frigatebirds ==
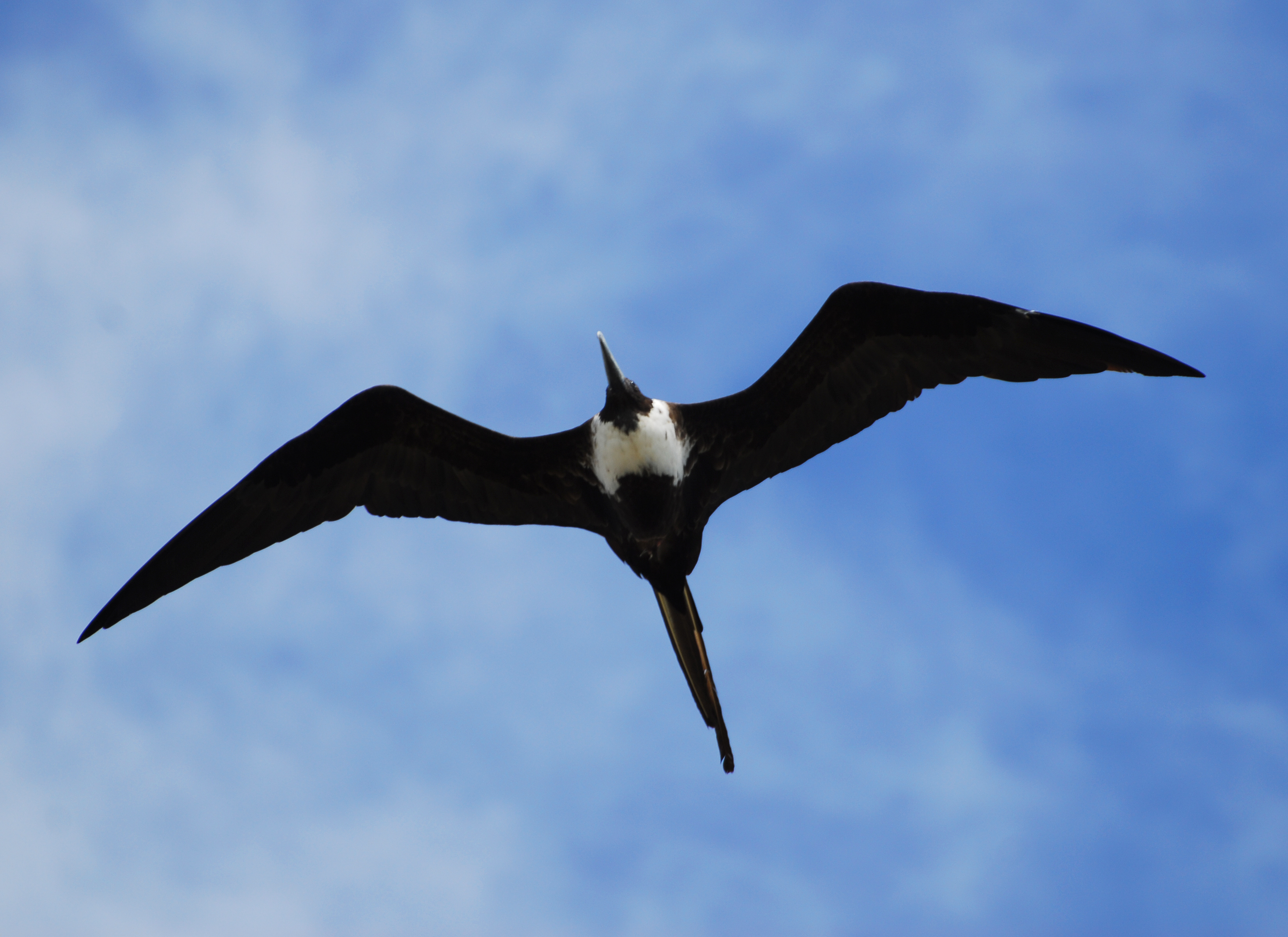
Magnificent frigatebird

Order: Suliformes Family: Fregatidae

Frigatebirds are large seabirds usually found over tropical oceans. They are large, black, or black-and-white, with long wings and deeply forked tails. The males have colored inflatable throat pouches. They do not swim or walk and cannot take off from a flat surface. Having the largest wingspan-to-body-weight ratio of any bird, they are essentially aerial, able to stay aloft for more than a week.

- Lesser frigatebird, Fregata ariel (C) LC
- Magnificent frigatebird, Fregata magnificens LC
- Great frigatebird, Fregata minor LC

== Boobies and gannets ==
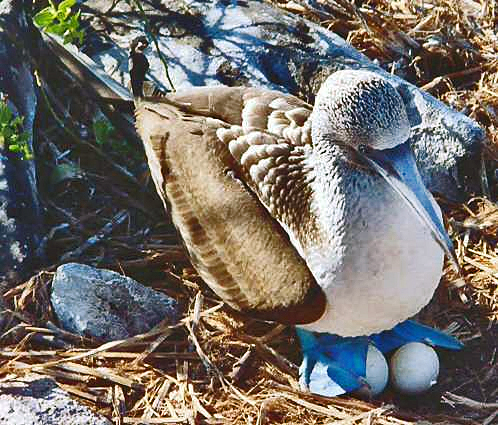
Blue-footed booby

Order: Suliformes Family: Sulidae

The sulids comprise the gannets and boobies. Both groups are medium-large coastal seabirds that plunge-dive for fish.

- Masked booby, Sula dactylatra LC
- Nazca booby, Sula granti (C) LC
- Blue-footed booby, Sula nebouxii (C) LC
- Brown booby, Sula leucogaster LC
- Cocos booby,Sula brewsteri LC
- Red-footed booby, Sula sula LC
- Abbott's booby, Papasula abbotti (Northern Mariana Islands) (A) EN
- Northern gannet, Morus bassanus LC

== Anhingas ==
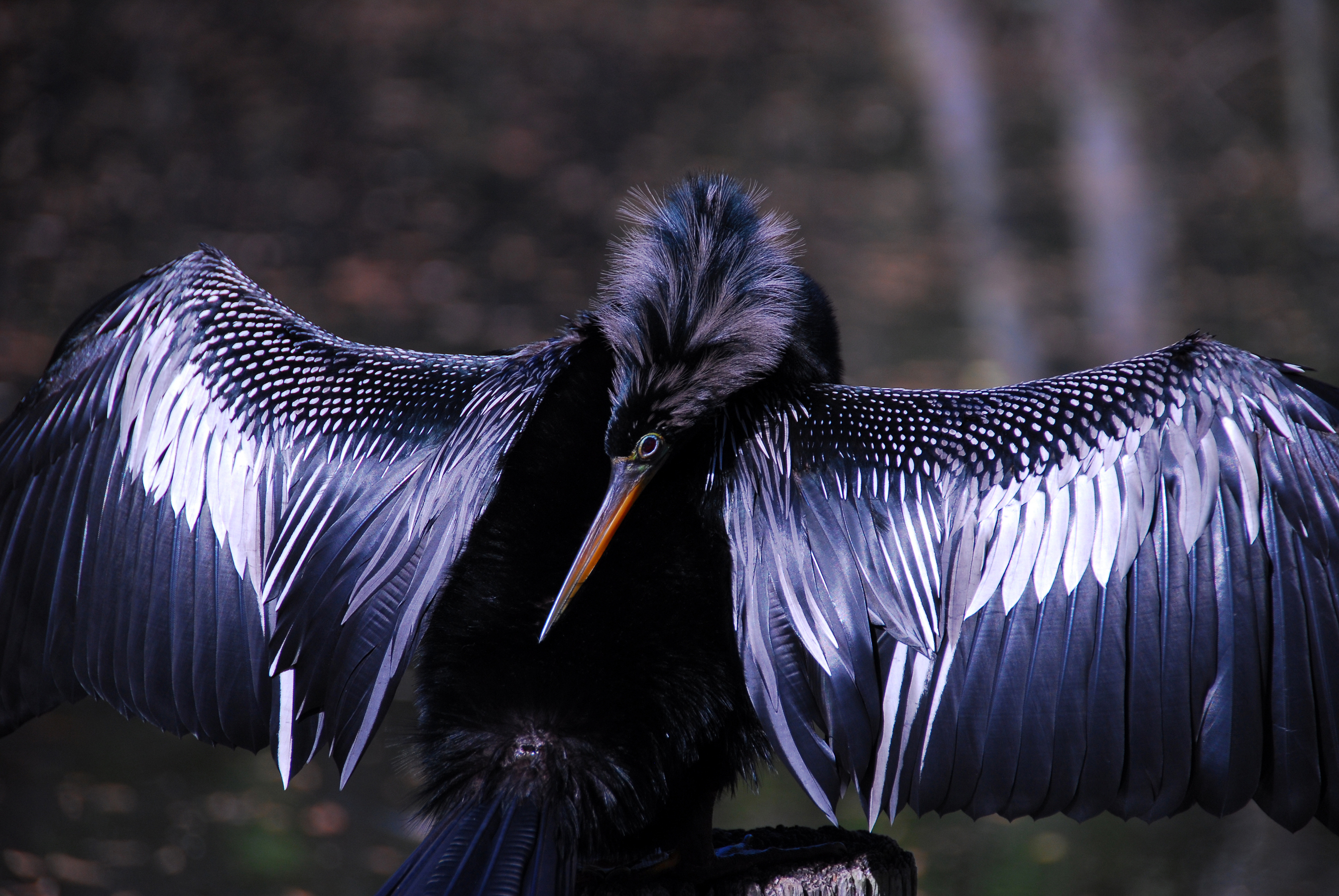
Anhinga

Order: Suliformes Family: Anhingidae

Anhingas are cormorant-like water birds with very long necks and long straight beaks. They are fish eaters which often swim with only their neck above the water.

- Anhinga, Anhinga anhinga LC

== Cormorants and shags ==
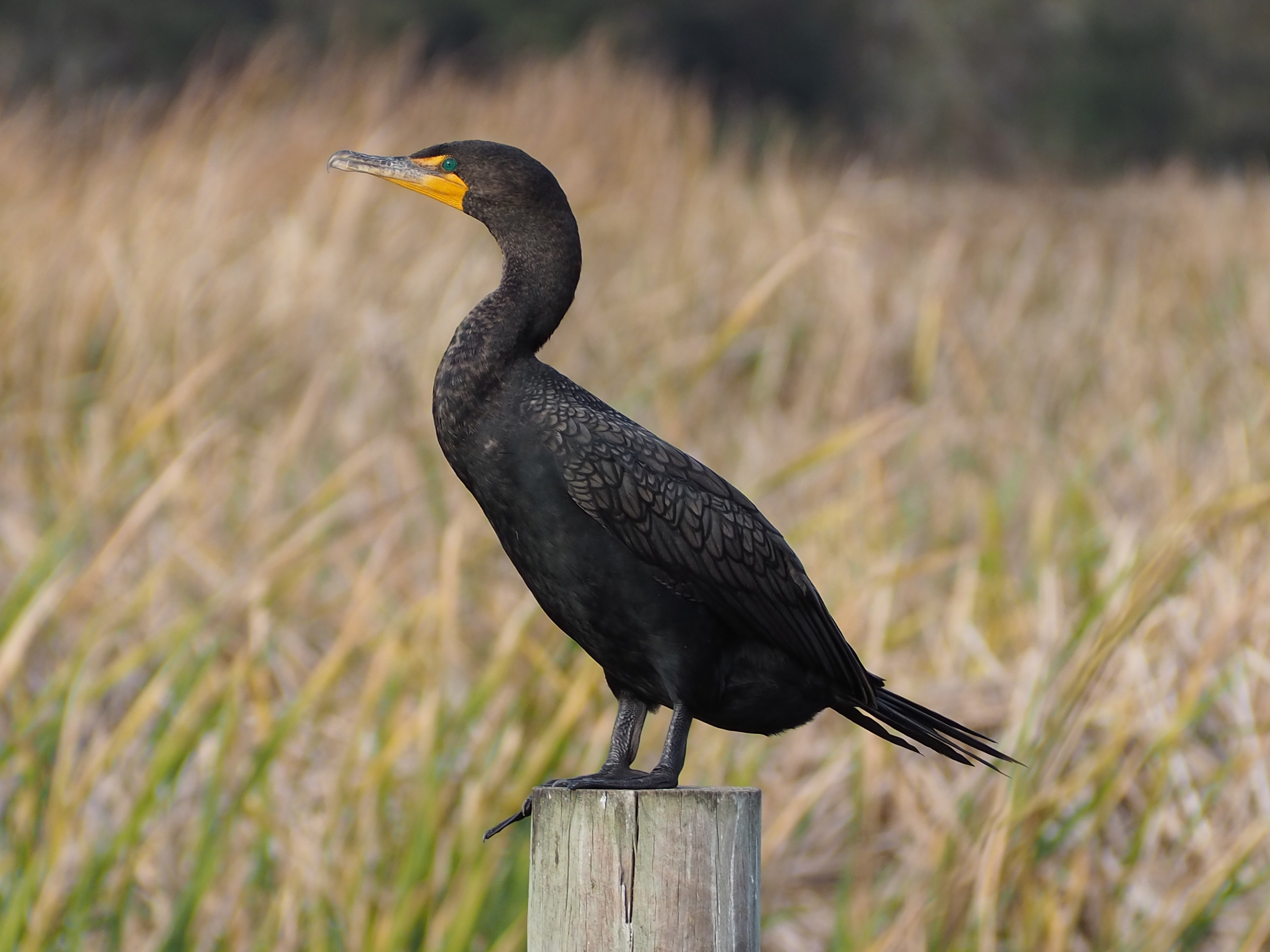
Double-crested cormorant

Order: Suliformes Family: Phalacrocoracidae

Cormorants are medium-to-large aquatic birds, usually with mainly dark plumage and areas of colored skin on the face. The bill is long, thin, and sharply hooked. Their feet are four-toed and webbed.

- Little pied cormorant, Microcarbo melanoleucos (Northern Mariana Islands) (A) LC
- Brandt's cormorant, Urile penicillatus LC
- Red-faced cormorant, Urile urile LC
- Pelagic cormorant, Urile pelagicus LC
- Great cormorant, Phalacrocorax carbo LC
- Double-crested cormorant, Nannopterum auritum LC
- Neotropic cormorant, Nannopterum brasilianum LC

== Pelicans ==
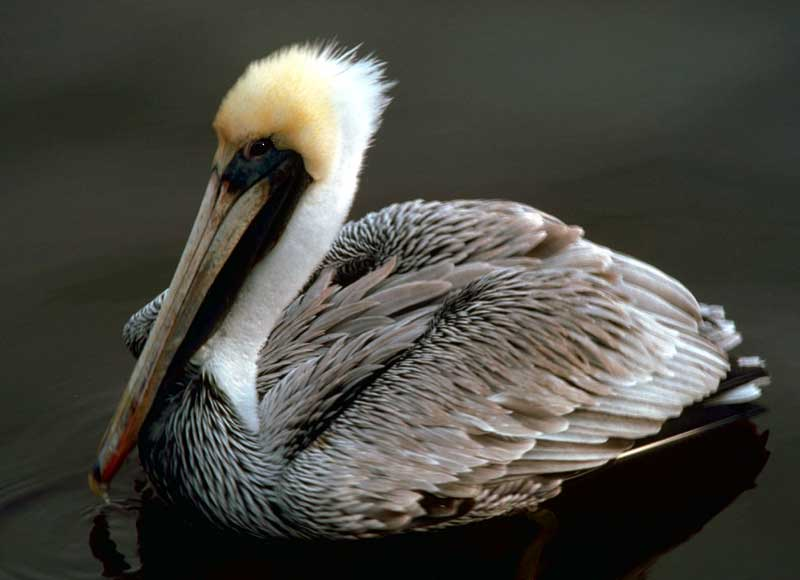
Brown pelican

Order: Pelecaniformes Family: Pelecanidae

Pelicans are very large water birds with a distinctive pouch under their beak. Like other birds in the order Pelecaniformes, they have four webbed toes.

- American white pelican, Pelecanus erythrorhynchos LC
- Brown pelican, Pelecanus occidentalis LC

== Herons, egrets, and bitterns ==
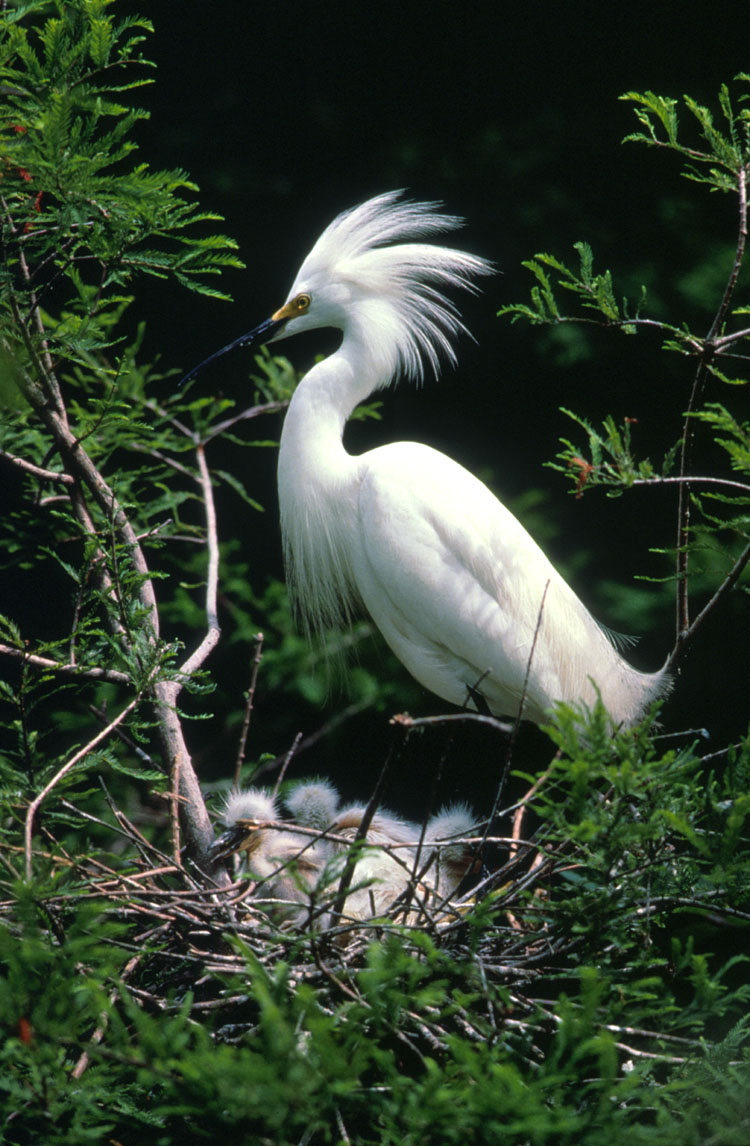
Snowy egret

Order: Pelecaniformes Family: Ardeidae

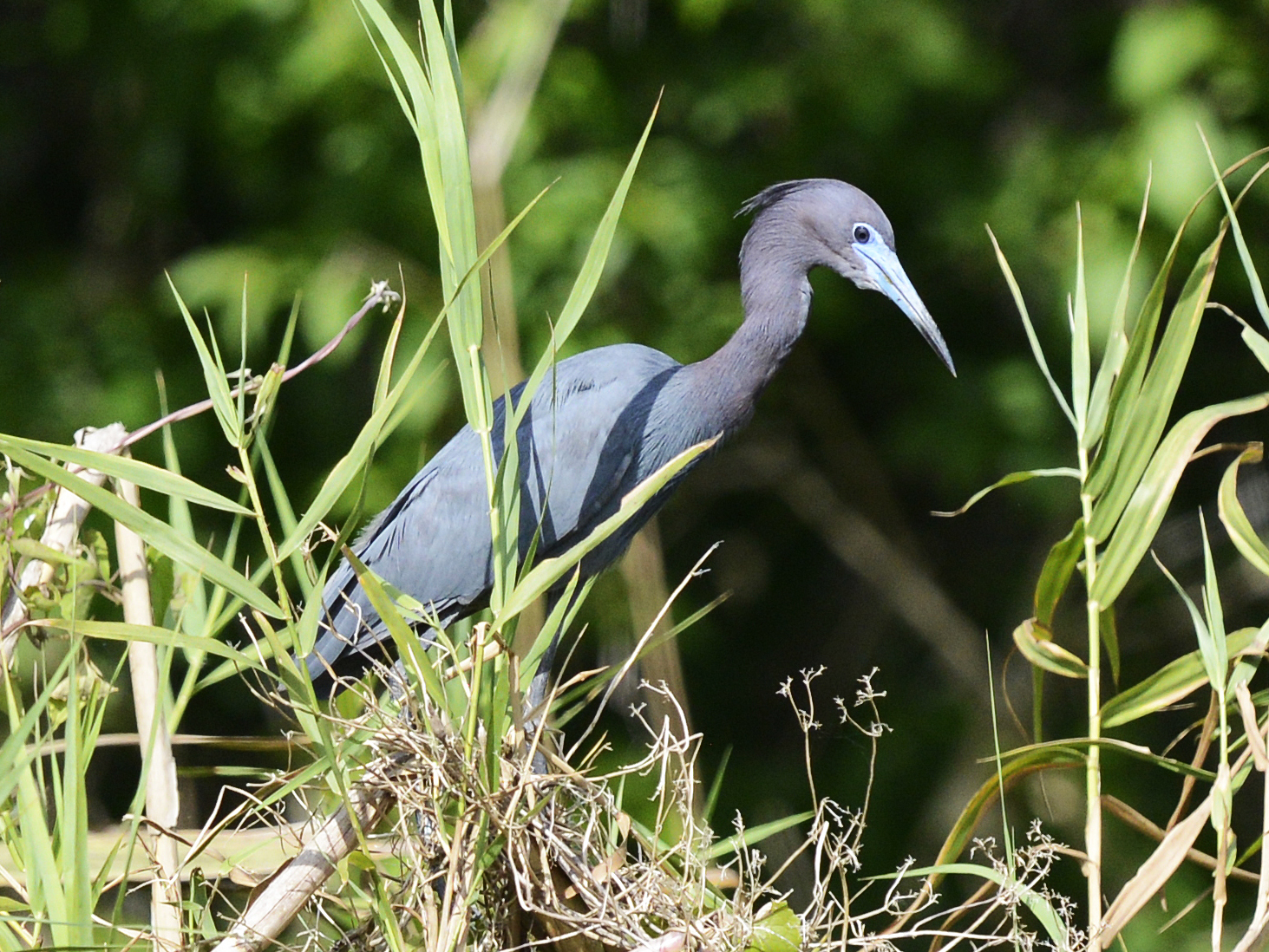
Little blue heron

The family Ardeidae contains the herons, egrets, and bitterns. Herons and egrets are medium to large wading birds with long necks and legs. Bitterns tend to be shorter necked and more secretive. Members of Ardeidae fly with their necks retracted, unlike other long-necked birds such as storks, ibises, and spoonbills.

- American bittern, Botaurus lentiginosus LC
- Yellow bittern, Ixobrychus sinensis (A) LC
- Cinnamon bittern, Ixobrychus cinnamomeus (Northern Mariana Islands) (A) LC
- Black bittern, Ixobrychus flavicollis (Guam) (A) LC
- Least bittern, Ixobrychus exilis LC
- Bare-throated tiger-heron, Tigrisoma mexicanum (A) LC
- Great blue heron, Ardea herodias LC
- Gray heron, Ardea cinerea (A) LC
- Great egret, Ardea alba LC
- Intermediate egret, Ardea intermedia (A) LC
- White-faced heron, Egretta novaehollandiae (American Samoa) (A) LC
- Chinese egret, Egretta eulophotes (A) VU
- Little egret, Egretta garzetta (C) LC
- Western reef-heron, Egretta gularis (A) LC
- Pacific reef-heron, Egretta sacra (American Samoa, Guam, Northern Mariana Islands) LC
- Snowy egret, Egretta thula LC
- Little blue heron, Egretta caerulea LC
- Tricolored heron, Egretta tricolor LC
- Reddish egret, Egretta rufescens NT
- Western cattle egret, Ardea ibis LC
- Chinese pond-heron, Ardeola bacchus (A) LC
- Green heron, Butorides virescens LC
- Striated heron, Butorides striata (Puerto Rico) (A) LC
- Black-crowned night-heron, Nycticorax nycticorax LC
- Nankeen night-heron, Nycticorax caledonicus (Northern Mariana Islands) (A) LC
- Yellow-crowned night-heron, Nyctanassa violacea LC

== Ibises and spoonbills ==
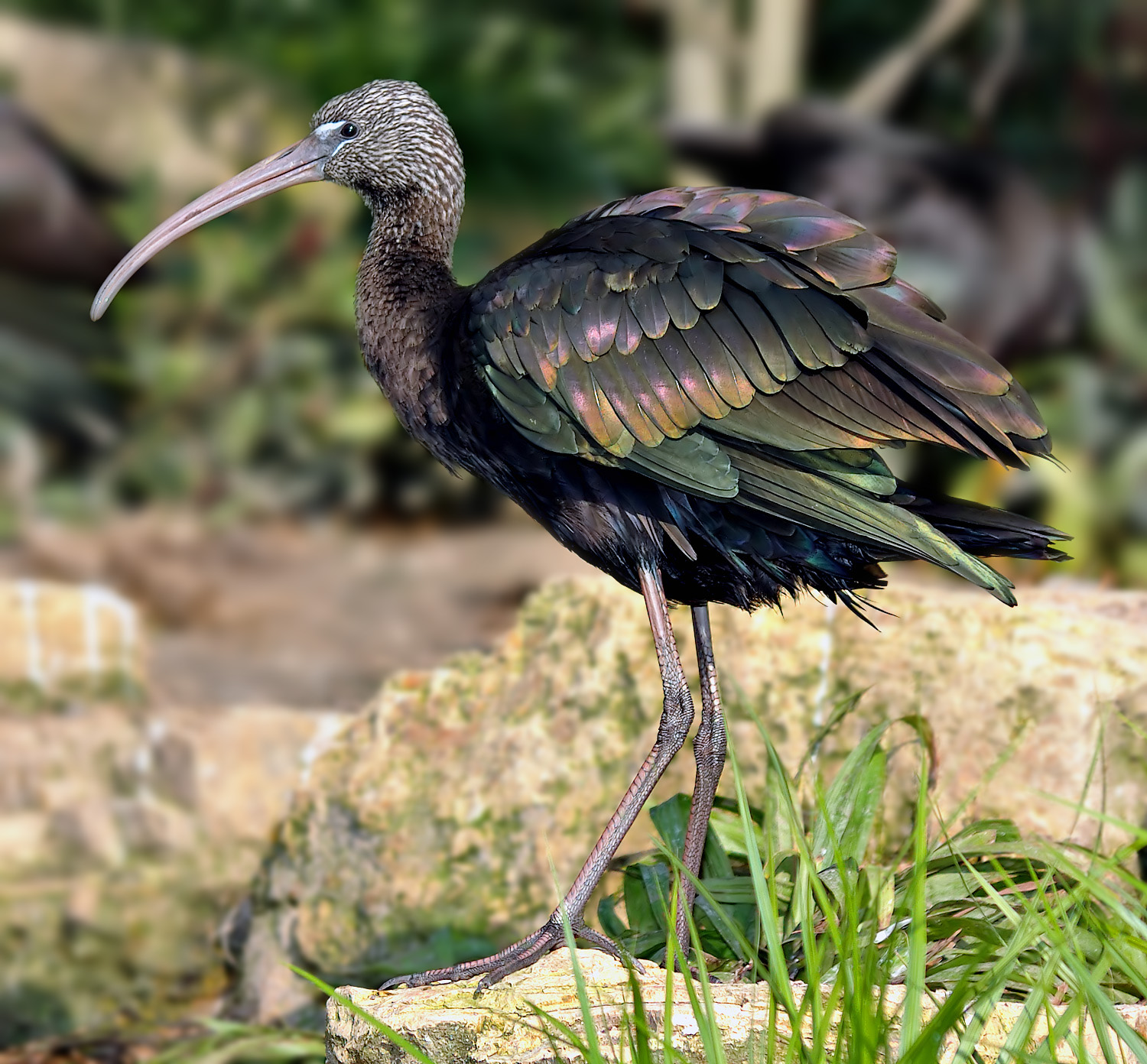
Glossy ibis

Order: Pelecaniformes Family: Threskiornithidae

The family Threskiornithidae includes the ibises and spoonbills. They have long, broad wings. Their bodies tend to be elongated, the neck more so, with rather long legs. The bill is also long, decurved in the case of the ibises, straight and distinctively flattened in the spoonbills.

- White ibis, Eudocimus albus LC
- Scarlet ibis, Eudocimus ruber (A) LC
- Glossy ibis, Plegadis falcinellus LC
- White-faced ibis, Plegadis chihi LC
- Roseate spoonbill, Platalea ajaja LC
- African sacred ibis, Threskiornis aethiopicus (I) LC

== New World vultures ==
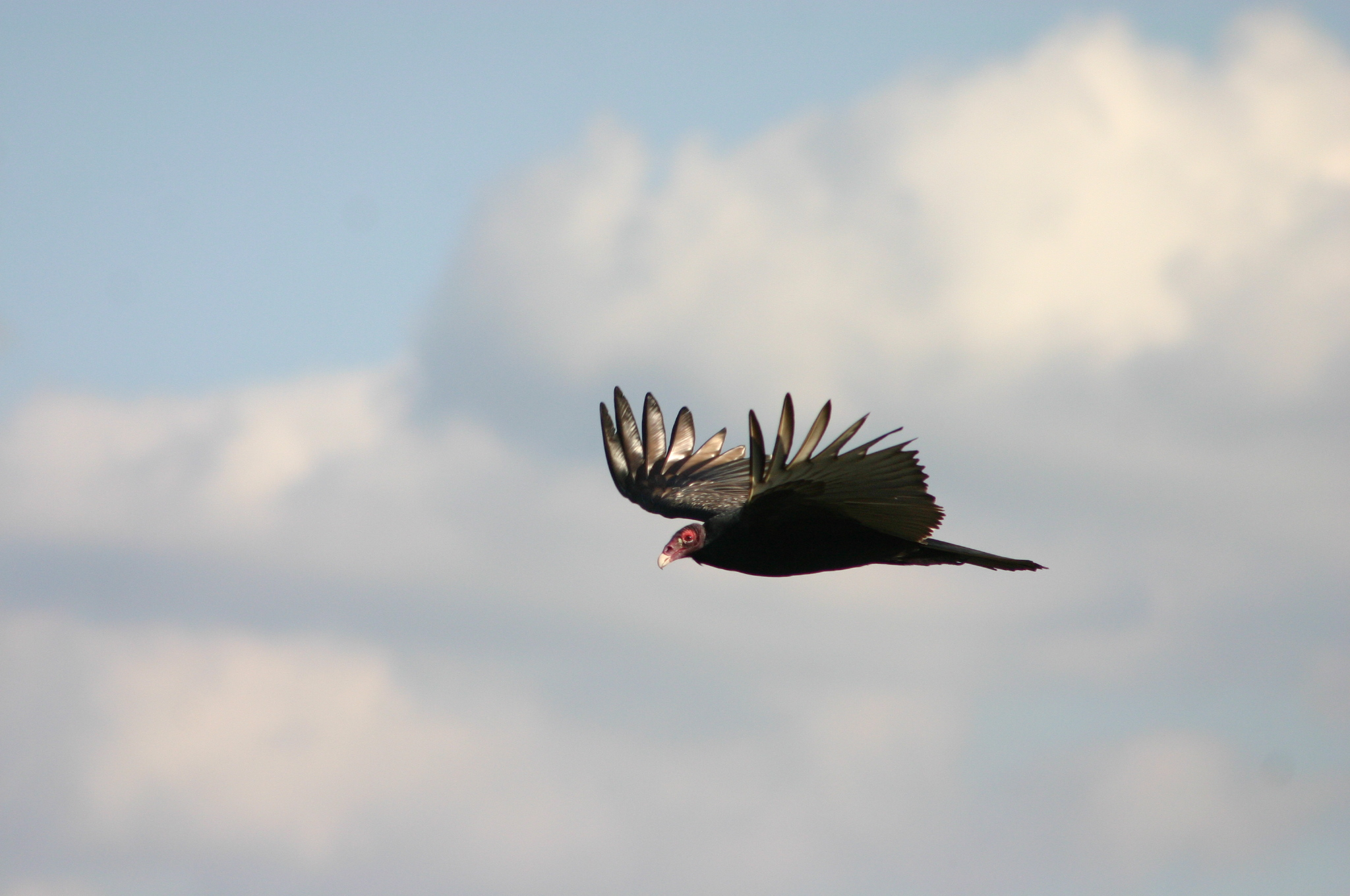
Turkey vulture

Order: Cathartiformes Family: Cathartidae

The New World vultures are not closely related to Old World vultures, but superficially resemble them because of convergent evolution. Like the Old World vultures, they are scavengers. However, unlike Old World vultures, which find carcasses by sight, New World vultures have a good sense of smell with which they locate carcasses.

- California condor, Gymnogyps californianus (Ex) (Note: The reintroduction of the California condor is in progress but the species is not yet reestablished per the California Bird Records Committee; it is "not self-sustaining" per the Cornell Lab of Ornithology.) CR
- Black vulture, Coragyps atratus LC
- Turkey vulture, Cathartes aura LC

== Osprey ==
Order: Accipitriformes Family: Pandionidae

Pandionidae is a monotypic family of fish-eating birds of prey. Its single species possesses a very large and powerful hooked beak, strong legs, strong talons, and keen eyesight.

- Osprey, Pandion haliaetus LC

== Hawks, eagles, and kites ==
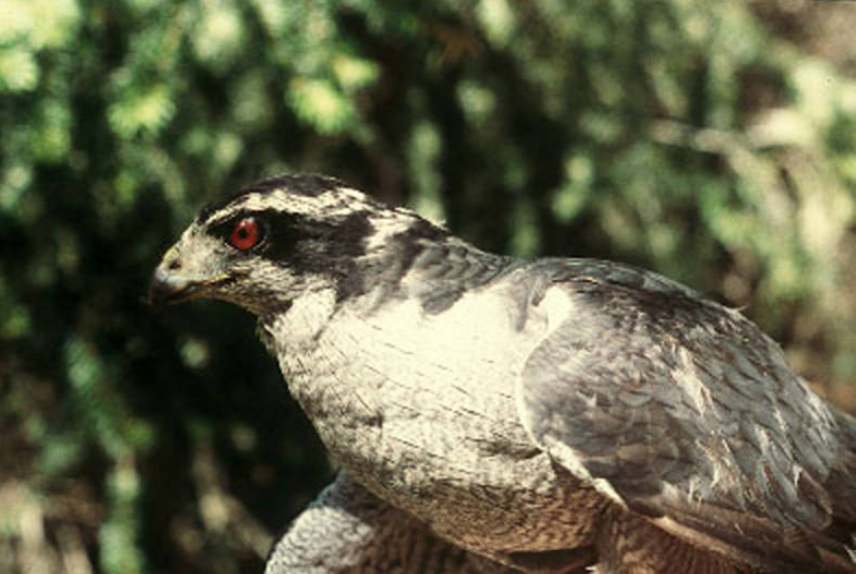
American goshawk

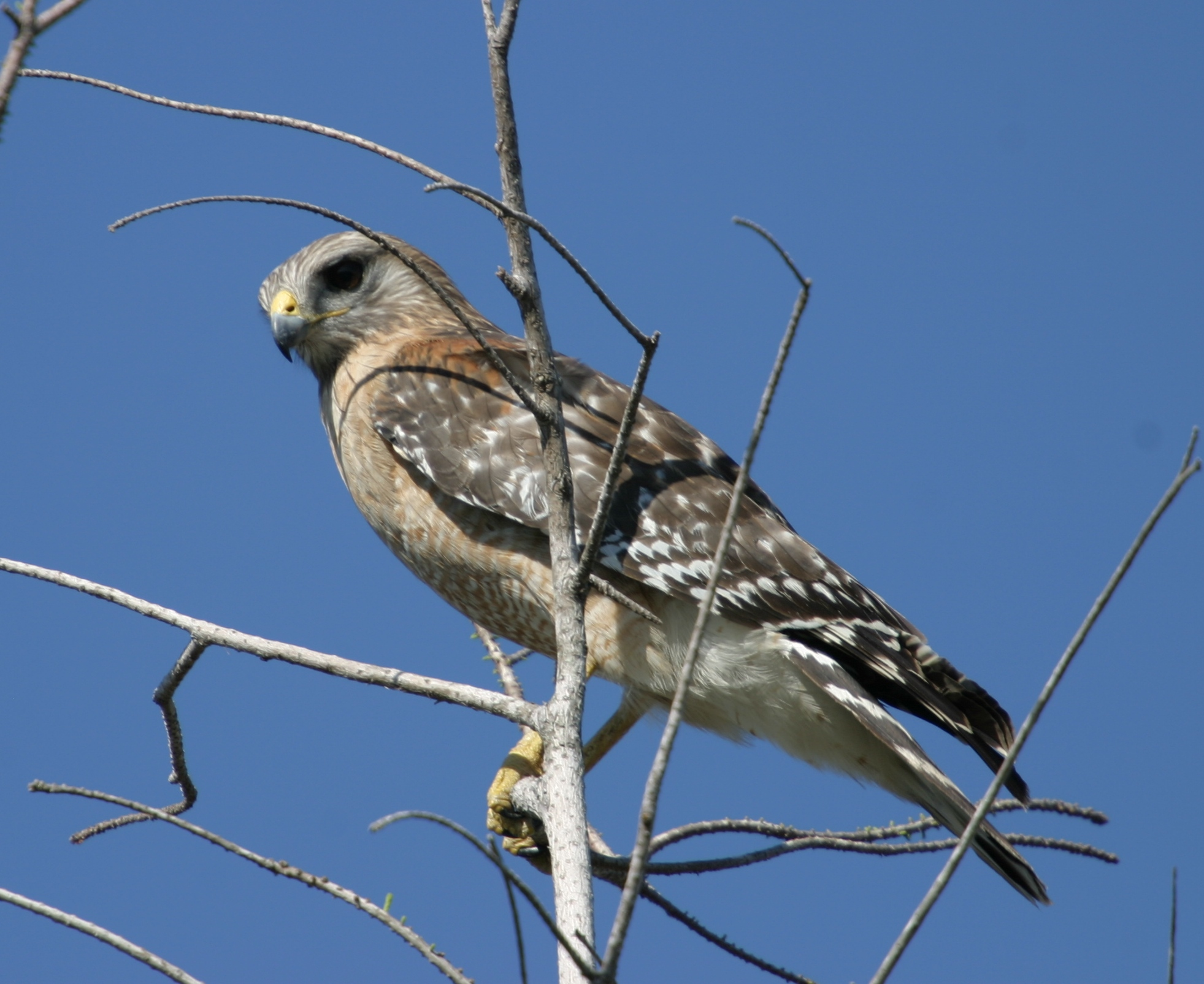
Red-shouldered hawk

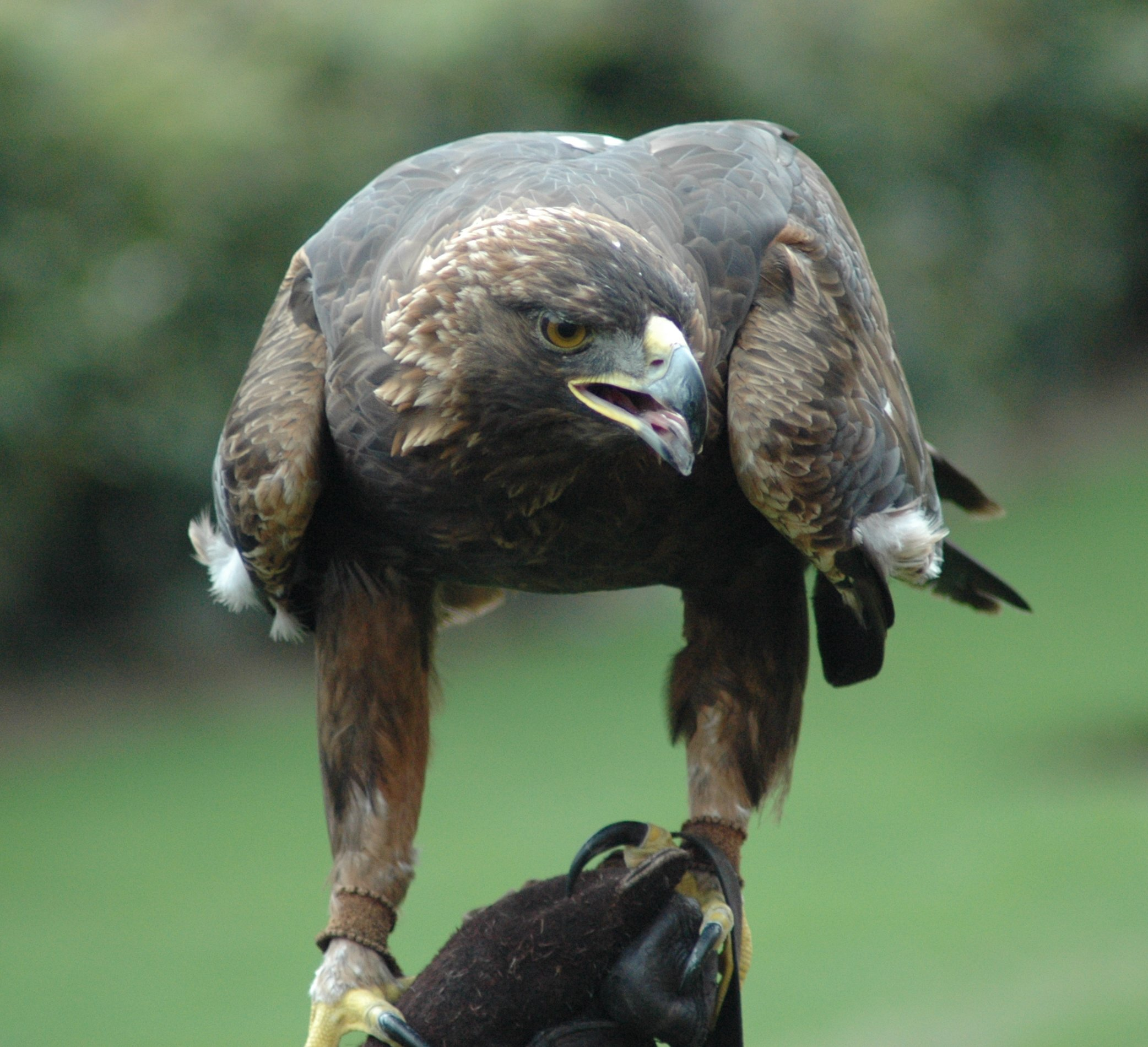
A five-year-old golden eagle

Order: Accipitriformes Family: Accipitridae

Accipitridae is a family of birds of prey which includes hawks, eagles, kites, harriers, and Old World vultures. These birds have very large powerful hooked beaks for tearing flesh from their prey, strong legs, powerful talons, and keen eyesight.

- White-tailed kite, Elanus leucurus LC
- Hook-billed kite, Chondrohierax uncinatus LC
- Swallow-tailed kite, Elanoides forficatus LC
- Golden eagle, Aquila chrysaetos LC
- Double-toothed kite, Harpagus bidentatus (A) LC
- Gray-faced buzzard, Butastur indicus (Guam) (A) LC
- Northern harrier, Circus hudsonius LC
- Western marsh-harrier, Circus aeruginosus LC
- Eastern marsh harrier, Circus spilonotus (Northern Mariana Islands) (A) LC
- Hen harrier, Circus cyaneus (U.S. Minor Outlying Islands) (A) LC
- Chinese sparrowhawk, Accipiter soloensis (A) LC
- Sharp-shinned hawk, Accipiter striatus LC
- Cooper's hawk, Accipiter cooperii LC
- Eurasian goshawk, Accipiter gentilis (A) LC
- American goshawk, Accipiter atricapillus LC
- Eurasian sparrowhawk, Accipiter nisus (A) LC
- Black kite, Milvus migrans (A) LC
- Bald eagle, Haliaeetus leucocephalus LC
- White-tailed eagle, Haliaeetus albicilla (C) LC
- Steller's sea-eagle, Haliaeetus pelagicus (C) VU
- Mississippi kite, Ictinia mississippiensis LC
- Crane hawk, Geranospiza caerulescens (A) LC
- Snail kite, Rostrhamus sociabilis LC
- Common black hawk, Buteogallus anthracinus LC
- Great black hawk, Buteogallus urubitinga (A) LC
- Roadside hawk, Rupornis magnirostris (C) LC
- Harris's hawk, Parabuteo unicinctus LC
- White-tailed hawk, Geranoaetus albicaudatus LC
- Gray hawk, Buteo plagiatus LC
- Red-shouldered hawk, Buteo lineatus LC
- Broad-winged hawk, Buteo platypterus LC
- Hawaiian hawk, Buteo solitarius (EH) NT
- Short-tailed hawk, Buteo brachyurus LC
- Swainson's hawk, Buteo swainsoni LC
- Zone-tailed hawk, Buteo albonotatus LC
- Red-tailed hawk, Buteo jamaicensis LC
- Rough-legged hawk, Buteo lagopus LC
- Ferruginous hawk, Buteo regalis LC
- Long-legged buzzard, Buteo rufinus (A) LC
- Common buzzard, Buteo buteo (Northern Mariana Islands) LC
- Eastern buzzard, Buteo japonicus (Northern Mariana Islands) (A) LC

== Barn-owls ==
Order: Strigiformes Family: Tytonidae

Owls in the family Tytonidae are medium to large owls with large heads and characteristic heart-shaped faces.

- American barn owl, Tyto furcata LC
- Western barn owl, Tyto alba (A) LC

== Owls ==
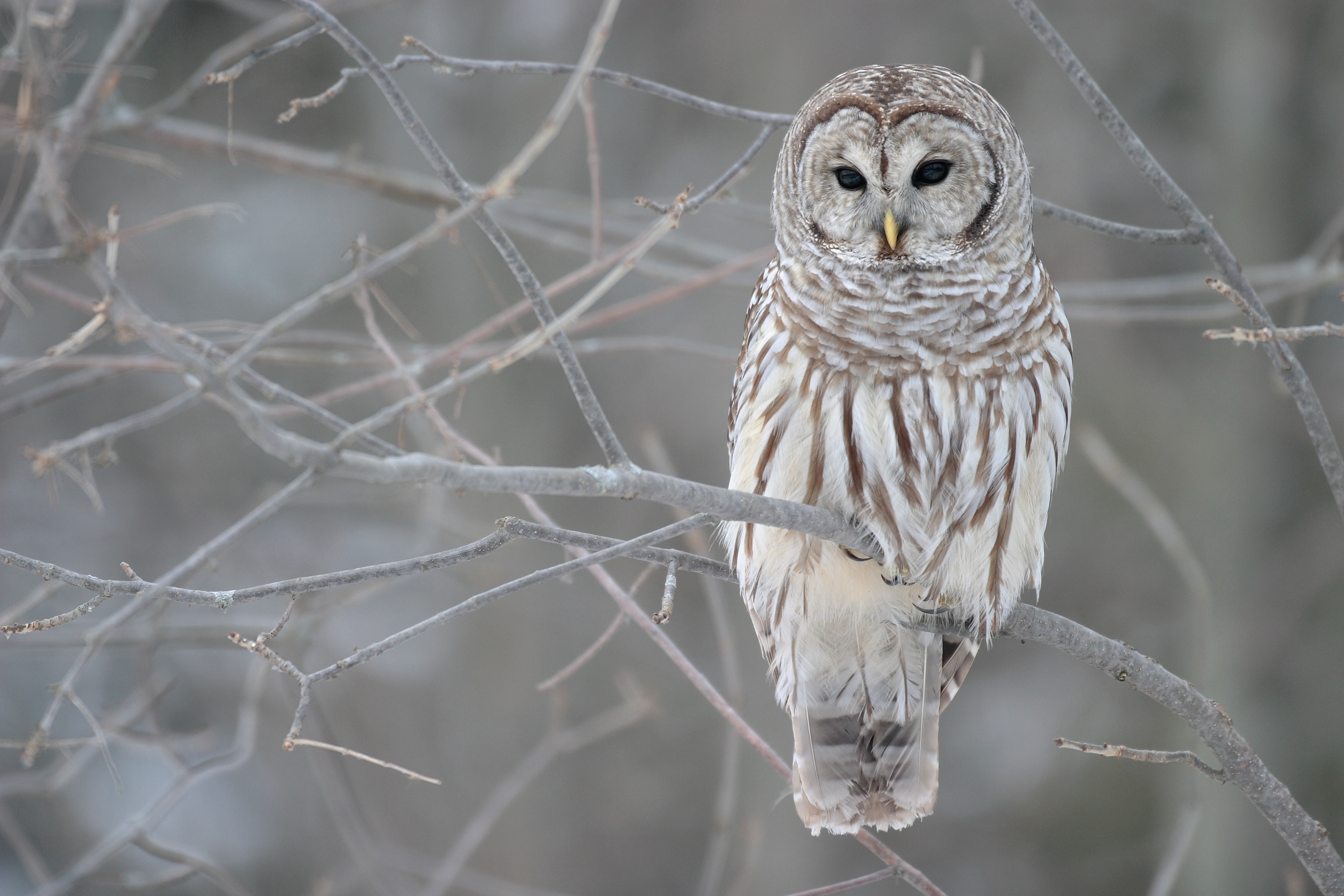
Barred owl

Order: Strigiformes Family: Strigidae

Typical or "true" owls are small to large solitary nocturnal birds of prey. They have large forward-facing eyes and ears, a hawk-like beak, and a conspicuous circle of feathers around each eye called a facial disk.

- Oriental scops-owl, Otus sunia (A) LC
- Flammulated owl, Psiloscops flammeolus LC
- Puerto Rican owl, Gymnasio nudipes (Puerto Rico) (EP) LC
- Whiskered screech-owl, Megascops trichopsis LC
- Western screech-owl, Megascops kennicottii LC
- Eastern screech-owl, Megascops asio LC
- Great horned owl, Bubo virginianus LC
- Snowy owl, Bubo scandiacus VU
- Northern hawk owl, Surnia ulula LC
- Northern pygmy-owl, Glaucidium gnoma LC
- Ferruginous pygmy-owl, Glaucidium brasilianum LC
- Elf owl, Micrathene whitneyi LC
- Burrowing owl, Athene cunicularia LC
- Mottled owl, Strix virgata (A) LC
- Spotted owl, Strix occidentalis NT
- Barred owl, Strix varia LC
- Great gray owl, Strix nebulosa LC
- Long-eared owl, Asio otus LC
- Stygian owl, Asio stygius (A) LC
- Short-eared owl, Asio flammeus LC
- Boreal owl, Aegolius funereus LC
- Northern saw-whet owl, Aegolius acadicus LC
- Northern boobook, Ninox scutulata (A) LC

== Trogons ==
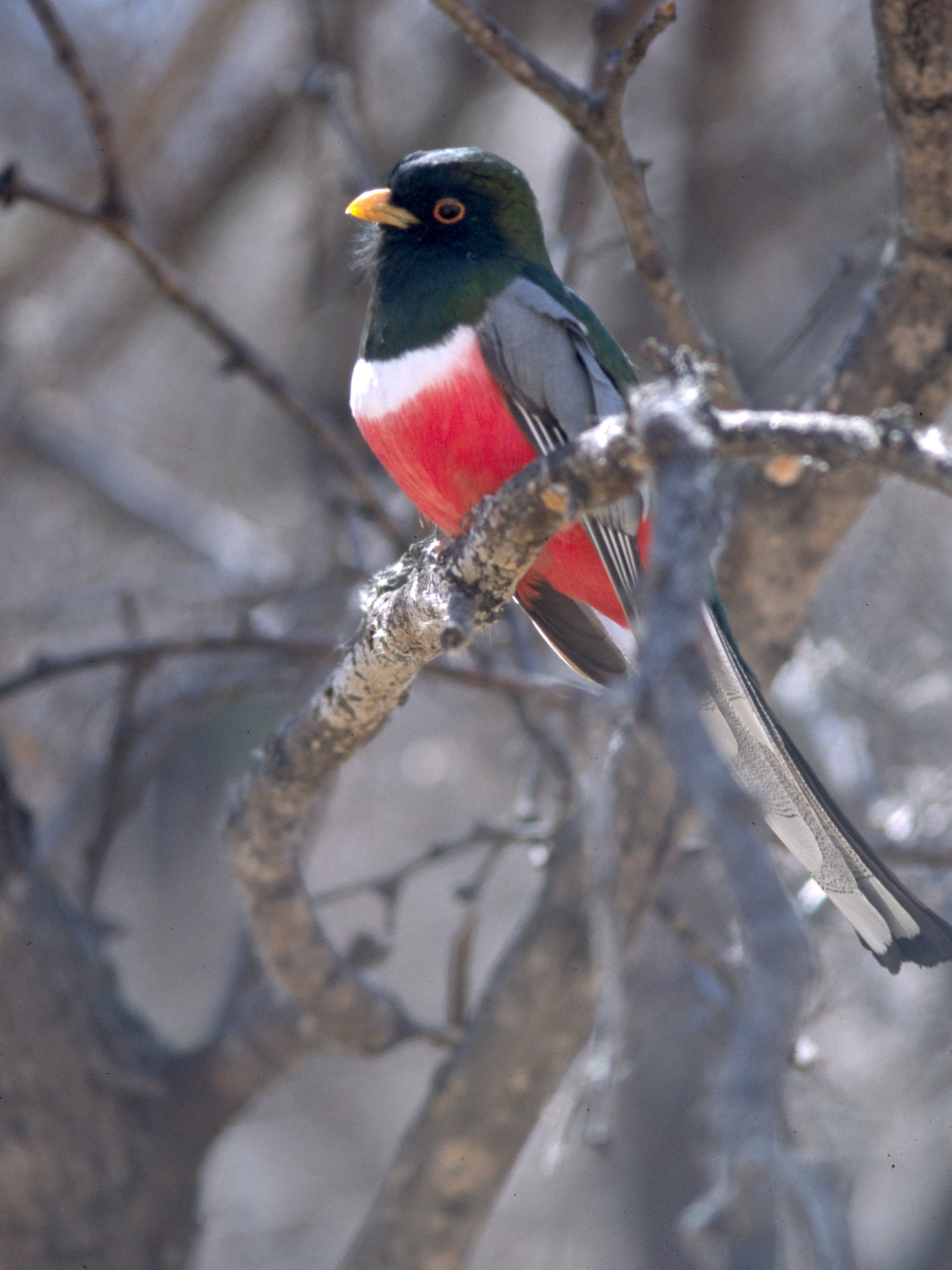
Elegant trogon

Order: Trogoniformes Family: Trogonidae

Trogons are residents of tropical forests worldwide with the greatest diversity in Central and South America. They feed on insects and fruit, and their broad bills and weak legs reflect their diet and arboreal habits. Although their flight is fast, they are reluctant to fly any distance. Trogons do not migrate. Trogons have soft, often colorful, feathers with distinctive male and female plumage. They nest in holes in trees or termite nests, laying white or pastel-colored eggs.

- Elegant trogon, Trogon elegans LC
- Eared quetzal, Euptilotis neoxenus (C) LC

== Hoopoes ==
Order: Upupiformes Family: Upupidae

Hoopoes spend much time on the ground hunting insects and worms. This black, white, and pink bird is quite unmistakable, especially in its erratic flight, which is like that of a giant butterfly. The crest is erectile, but is mostly kept closed. It walks on the ground like a starling. The song is a trisyllabic oop-oop-oop, which gives rise to its English and scientific names.

- Eurasian hoopoe, Upupa epops (A) LC

== Todies ==
Order: Coraciiformes Family: Todidae

Todies are a group of small near passerine forest species endemic to the Caribbean. These birds have colorful plumage and resembles kingfishers, but have flattened bills with serrated edges. They eat small prey such as insects and lizards.

- Puerto Rican tody, Todus mexicanus (Puerto Rico) (EP) LC

== Kingfishers ==
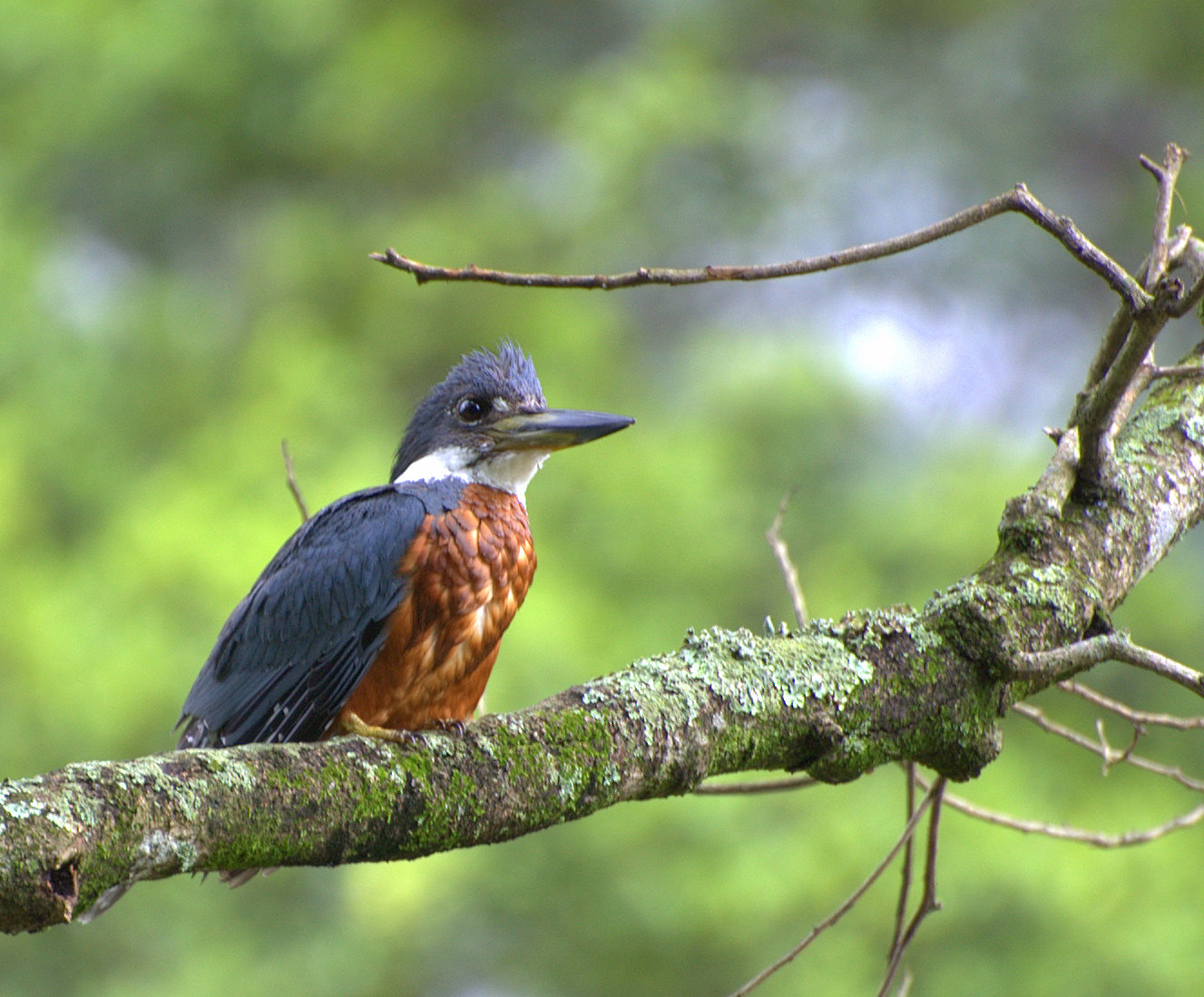
Ringed kingfisher

Order: Coraciiformes Family: Alcedinidae

Kingfishers are medium-sized birds with large heads, long, pointed bills, short legs, and stubby tails.

- Common kingfisher, Alcedo atthis (Guam) (A) LC
- Pacific kingfisher, Todiramphus sacer (American Samoa)
- Guam kingfisher, Todiramphus cinnamominus (Guam) (EG) EW
- Collared kingfisher, Todiramphus chloris (American Samoa) LC
- Mariana kingfisher, Todiramphus albicilla (Northern Mariana Islands) (ENM)
- Ringed kingfisher, Megaceryle torquata LC
- Belted kingfisher, Megaceryle alcyon LC
- Amazon kingfisher, Chloroceryle amazona (A) LC
- Green kingfisher, Chloroceryle americana LC

== Rollers ==
Order: Coraciiformes Family: Coraciidae

Rollers resemble crows in size and build, but are more closely related to the kingfishers and bee-eaters. They share the colorful appearance of those groups with blues and browns predominating. The two inner front toes are connected, but the outer toe is not.

- Oriental dollarbird, Eurystomus orientalis (Guam, Northern Mariana Islands) (A) LC

== Woodpeckers ==
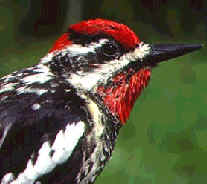
Red-naped sapsucker

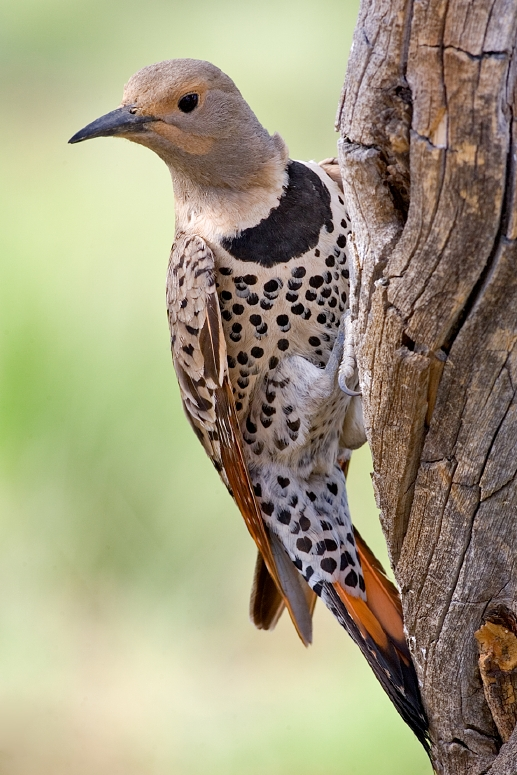
Northern flicker

Order: Piciformes Family: Picidae

Woodpeckers are small to medium-sized birds with chisel-like beaks, short legs, stiff tails, and long tongues used for capturing insects. Some species have feet with two toes pointing forward and two backward, while several species have only three toes. Many woodpeckers have the habit of tapping noisily on tree trunks with their beaks.

- Eurasian wryneck, Jynx torquilla (A) LC
- Lewis's woodpecker, Melanerpes lewis LC
- Puerto Rican woodpecker, Melanerpes portoricensis (Puerto Rico, extirpated from U.S. Virgin Islands) (EP) LC
- Red-headed woodpecker, Melanerpes erythrocephalus LC
- Acorn woodpecker, Melanerpes formicivorus LC
- Gila woodpecker, Melanerpes uropygialis LC
- Golden-fronted woodpecker, Melanerpes aurifrons LC
- Red-bellied woodpecker, Melanerpes carolinus LC
- Williamson's sapsucker, Sphyrapicus thyroideus LC
- Yellow-bellied sapsucker, Sphyrapicus varius LC
- Red-naped sapsucker, Sphyrapicus nuchalis LC
- Red-breasted sapsucker, Sphyrapicus ruber LC
- American three-toed woodpecker, Picoides dorsalis LC
- Black-backed woodpecker, Picoides arcticus LC
- Great spotted woodpecker, Dendrocopos major (C) LC
- Downy woodpecker, Dryobates pubescens LC
- Nuttall's woodpecker, Dryobates nuttallii LC
- Ladder-backed woodpecker, Dryobates scalaris LC
- Red-cockaded woodpecker, Dryobates borealis (EM) NT
- Hairy woodpecker, Dryobates villosus LC
- White-headed woodpecker, Dryobates albolarvatus LC
- Arizona woodpecker, Dryobates arizonae LC
- Northern flicker, Colaptes auratus LC
- Gilded flicker, Colaptes chrysoides LC
- Pileated woodpecker, Dryocopus pileatus LC
- Ivory-billed woodpecker, Campephilus principalis (E?)(Ex?) CR

== Falcons and caracaras ==
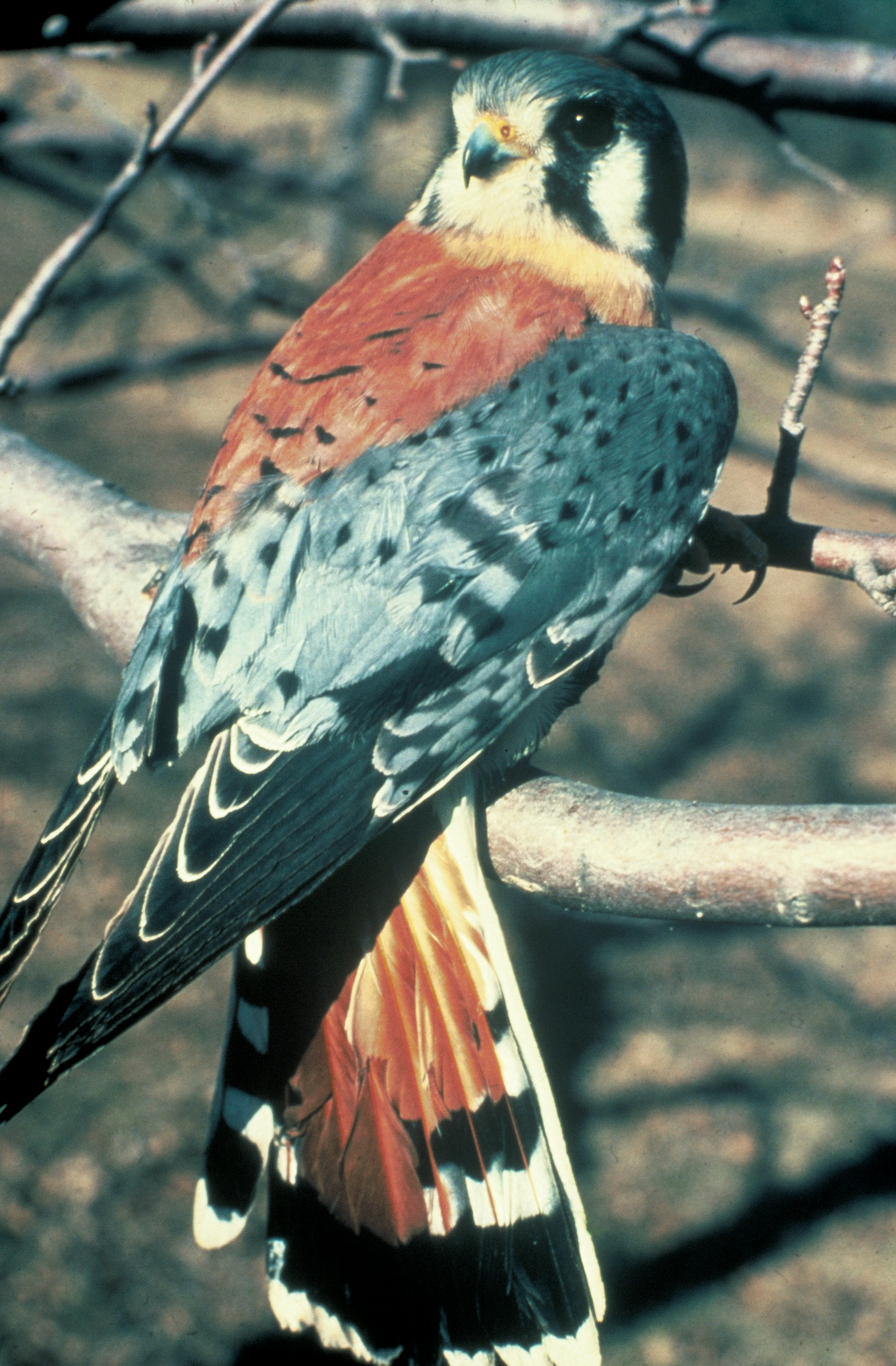
American kestrel

Order: Falconiformes Family: Falconidae

Falconidae is a family of diurnal birds of prey, notably the falcons and caracaras. They differ from hawks, eagles, and kites in that they kill with their beaks instead of their talons.

- Collared forest-falcon, Micrastur semitorquatus (A) LC
- Crested caracara, Caracara plancus LC
- Eurasian kestrel, Falco tinnunculus (C) LC
- American kestrel, Falco sparverius LC
- Red-footed falcon, Falco vespertinus (A) NT
- Amur falcon, Falco amurensis (Northern Mariana Islands) (A) LC
- Merlin, Falco columbarius LC
- Eurasian hobby, Falco subbuteo (C) LC
- Aplomado falcon, Falco femoralis LC
- Gyrfalcon, Falco rusticolus LC
- Peregrine falcon, Falco peregrinus LC
- Prairie falcon, Falco mexicanus LC

== Cockatoos ==
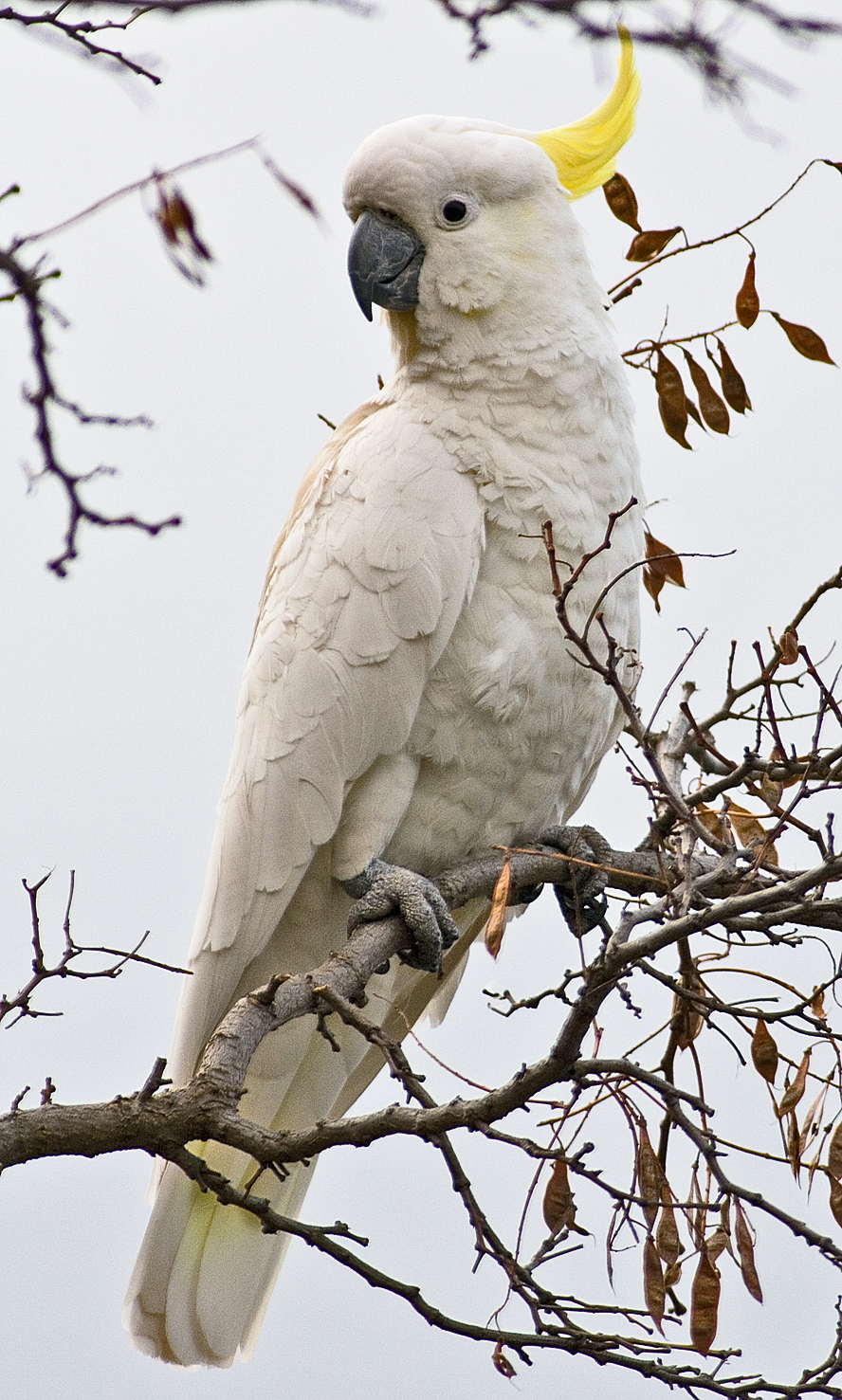
Sulphur-crested cockatoo

Order: Psittaciformes Family: Cacatuidae

Cockatoos share many features with true parrots (family Psittacidae) including the characteristic curved beak shape and a zygodactyl foot, with two forward toes and two backwards toes. They differ, however in a number of characteristics, including the movable headcrest, and their lack of the Dyck texture feather composition, which gives many parrots their iridescent colors. Cockatoos are also, on average, larger than the true parrots.

- Tanimbar corella, Cacatua goffiniana (Puerto Rico) (I) LC
- Sulphur-crested cockatoo, Cacatua galerita (Puerto Rico) (I) LC
- White cockatoo, Cacatua alba (Puerto Rico) (I) EN

== New World and African parrots ==
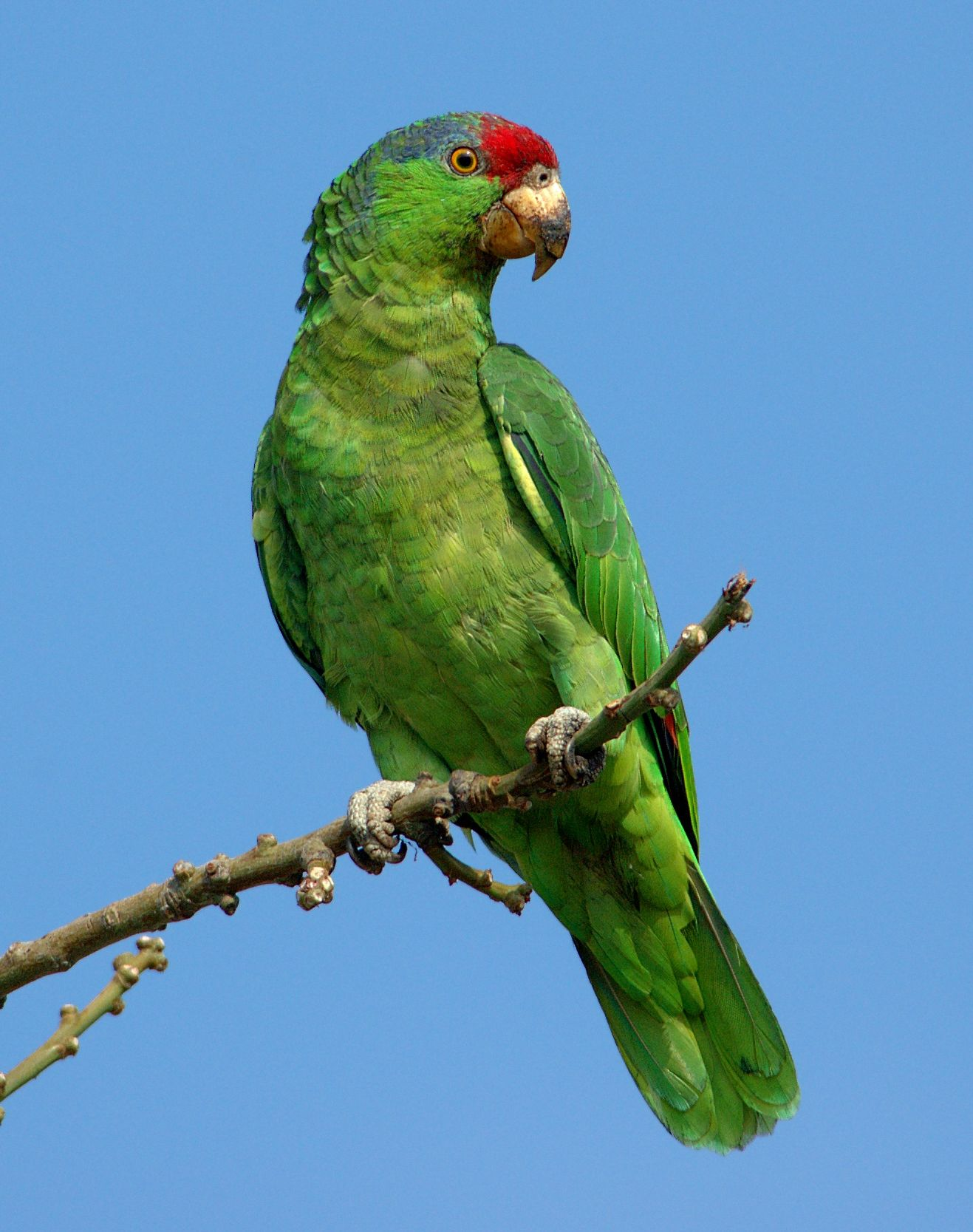
Red-crowned parrot

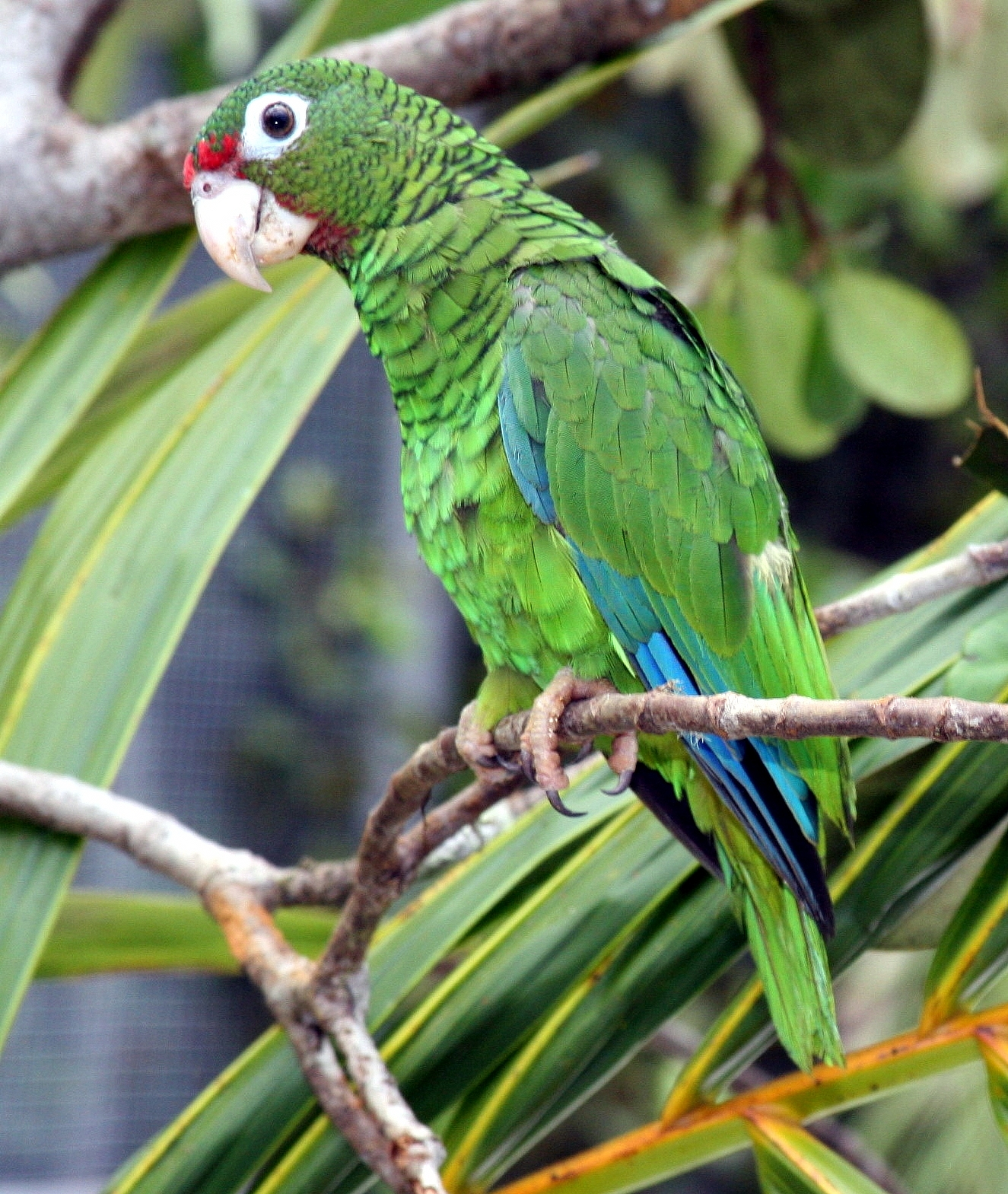
Puerto Rican parrot

Order: Psittaciformes Family: Psittacidae

Characteristic features of parrots include a strong curved bill, an upright stance, strong legs, and clawed zygodactyl feet. Many parrots are vividly colored, and some are multi-colored. In size they range from 8 cm (3.1 in) to 1 m (3.3 ft) in length. Most of the more than 150 species in this family are found in the New World.

- Monk parakeet, Myiopsitta monachus (I) LC
- Carolina parakeet, Conuropsis carolinensis (E) EX
- Orange-fronted parakeet, Eupsittula canicularis (Puerto Rico) (I) LC
- Brown-throated parakeet, Eupsittula pertinax (Puerto Rico, U.S. Virgin Islands) (I)(Ex?) LC
- Nanday parakeet, Aratinga nenday (I) LC
- Green parakeet, Psittacara holochlorus LC
- Puerto Rican parakeet, Psittacara maugei (Puerto Rico) (EP) (E) EX
- Hispaniolan parakeet, Psittacara choloropterus (Puerto Rico) (I) VU
- Mitred parakeet, Psittacara mitratus (I) LC
- Red-masked parakeet, Psittacara erythrogenys (Puerto Rico) (I) NT
- Thick-billed parrot, Rhynchopsitta pachyrhyncha (Ex) EN
- White-winged parakeet, Brotogeris versicolurus (I) LC
- Yellow-chevroned parakeet, Brotogeris chiriri (I) LC
- White-fronted parrot, Amazon albifrons (Puerto Rico) (I) LC
- Hispaniolan parrot, Amazona ventralis (Puerto Rico, U.S. Virgin Islands) (I) VU
- Puerto Rican parrot, Amazona vittata (Puerto Rico) (EP) CR
- Orange-winged parrot, Amazona amazonica (Puerto Rico) (I) LC
- Red-crowned parrot, Amazona viridigenalis (I) EN
- Yellow-headed parrot, Amazona oratrix (Puerto Rico) (I) EN

== Old World parrots ==
Order: Psittaciformes Family: Psittaculidae

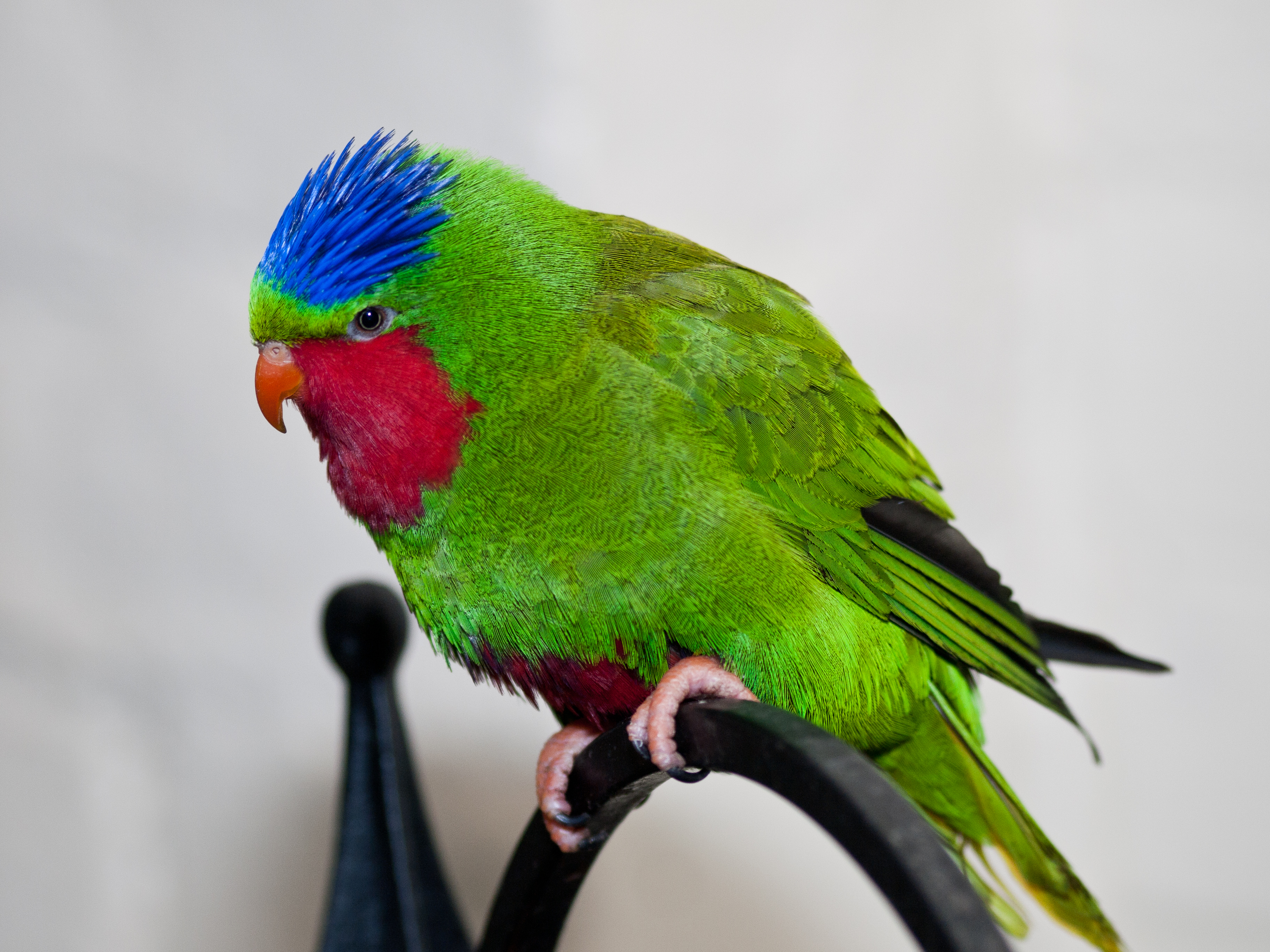
Blue-crowned lorikeet

Characteristic features of parrots include a strong curved bill, an upright stance, strong legs, and clawed zygodactyl feet. Many parrots are vividly colored, and some are multi-colored. In size they range from 8 cm (3.1 in) to 1 m (3.3 ft) in length. Old World parrots are found from Africa east across south and southeast Asia and Oceania to Australia and New Zealand.

- Rose-ringed parakeet, Psittacula krameri (I) LC
- Blue-crowned lorikeet, Vini australis (American Samoa) LC
- Rosy-faced lovebird, Agapornis roseicollis (I) LC

== Tityras and allies ==
Order: Passeriformes Family: Tityridae

Tityridae is family of suboscine passerine birds found in forest and woodland in the Neotropics. The approximately 30 species in this family were formerly lumped with the families Pipridae and Cotingidae (see Taxonomy). As yet, no widely accepted common name exists for the family, although Tityras and allies and Tityras, mourners, and allies have been used. They are small to medium-sized birds.

- Masked tityra, Tityra semifasciata (A) LC
- Gray-collared becard, Pachyramphus major (A) LC
- Rose-throated becard, Pachyramphus aglaiae LC

== Honeyeaters ==
Order: Passeriformes Family: Meliphagidae

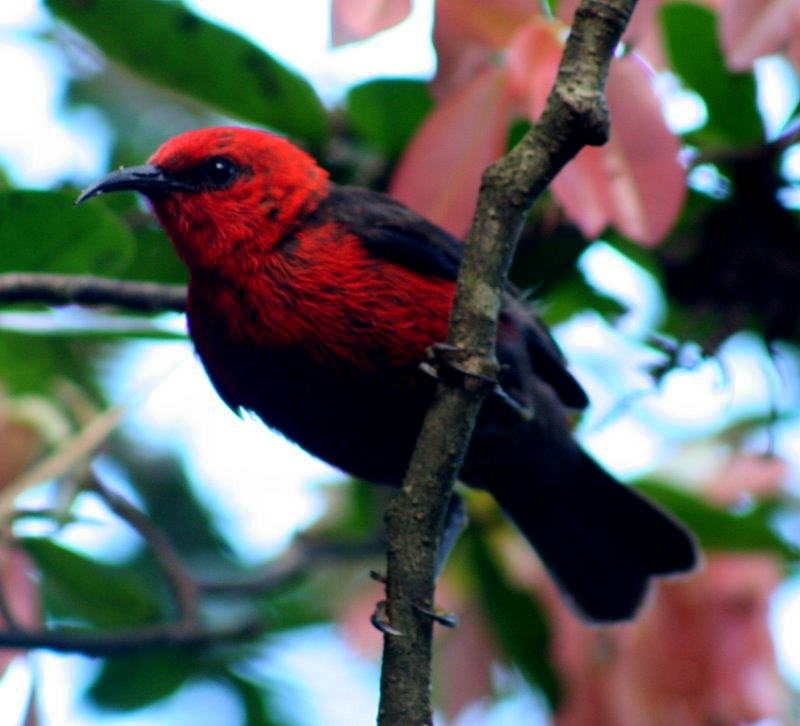
Micronesian myzomela

The honeyeaters are a large and diverse family of small to medium-sized birds most common in Australia and New Guinea. They are nectar feeders and closely resemble other nectar-feeding passerines.

- Micronesian myzomela, Myzomela rubratra (Northern Mariana Islands; extirpated from Guam) LC
- Cardinal myzomela, Myzomela cardinalis (American Samoa, extirpated from Guam) LC
- Mao, Gymnomyza samoensis (American Samoa) (Ex) EN
- Eastern wattled-honeyeater, Foulehaio carunculatus (American Samoa) LC

== Cuckooshrikes ==
Order: Passeriformes Family: Campephagidae

The cuckooshrikes are small to medium-sized passerine birds. They are predominantly grayish with white and black, although some species are brightly colored.

- Ashy minivet, Pericrocotus divaricatus (Northern Mariana Islands) (A) LC

== Drongos ==
Order: Passeriformes Family: Dicruridae

The drongos are mostly black or dark gray in color, sometimes with metallic tints. They have long forked tails, and some Asian species have elaborate tail decorations. They have short legs and sit very upright when perched, like a shrike. They flycatch or take prey from the ground.

- Black drongo, Dicrurus macrocercus (Guam, Northern Mariana Islands) (I) LC

== Fantails ==
Order: Passeriformes Family: Rhipiduridae

The fantails are small insectivorous birds which are specialist aerial feeders.

- Rufous fantail, Rhipidura rufifrons (Guam, Northern Mariana Islands) (Ex) LC

== Tyrant flycatchers ==
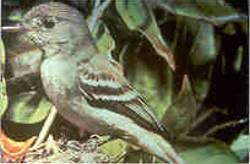
Willow flycatcher

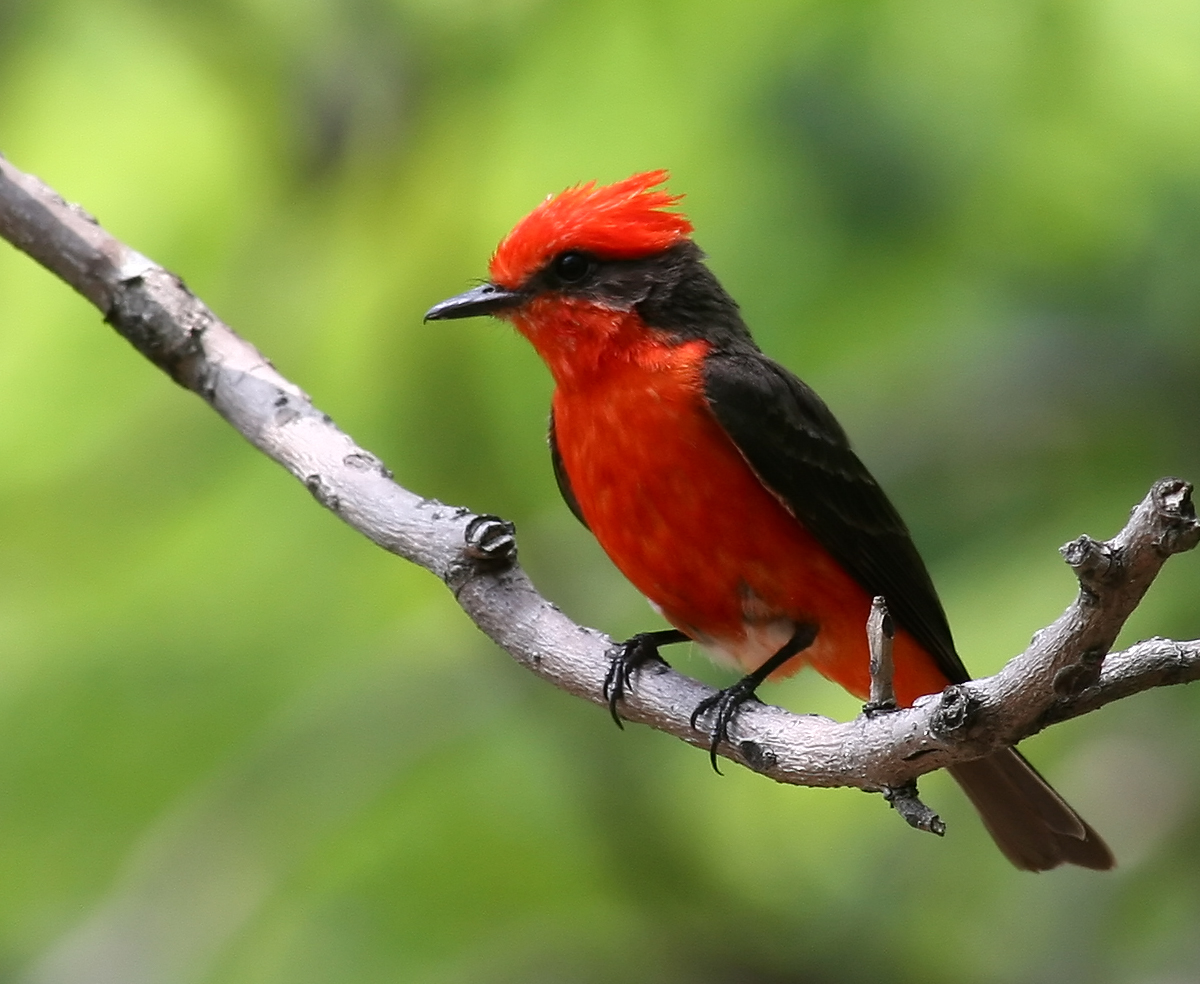
Vermilion flycatcher

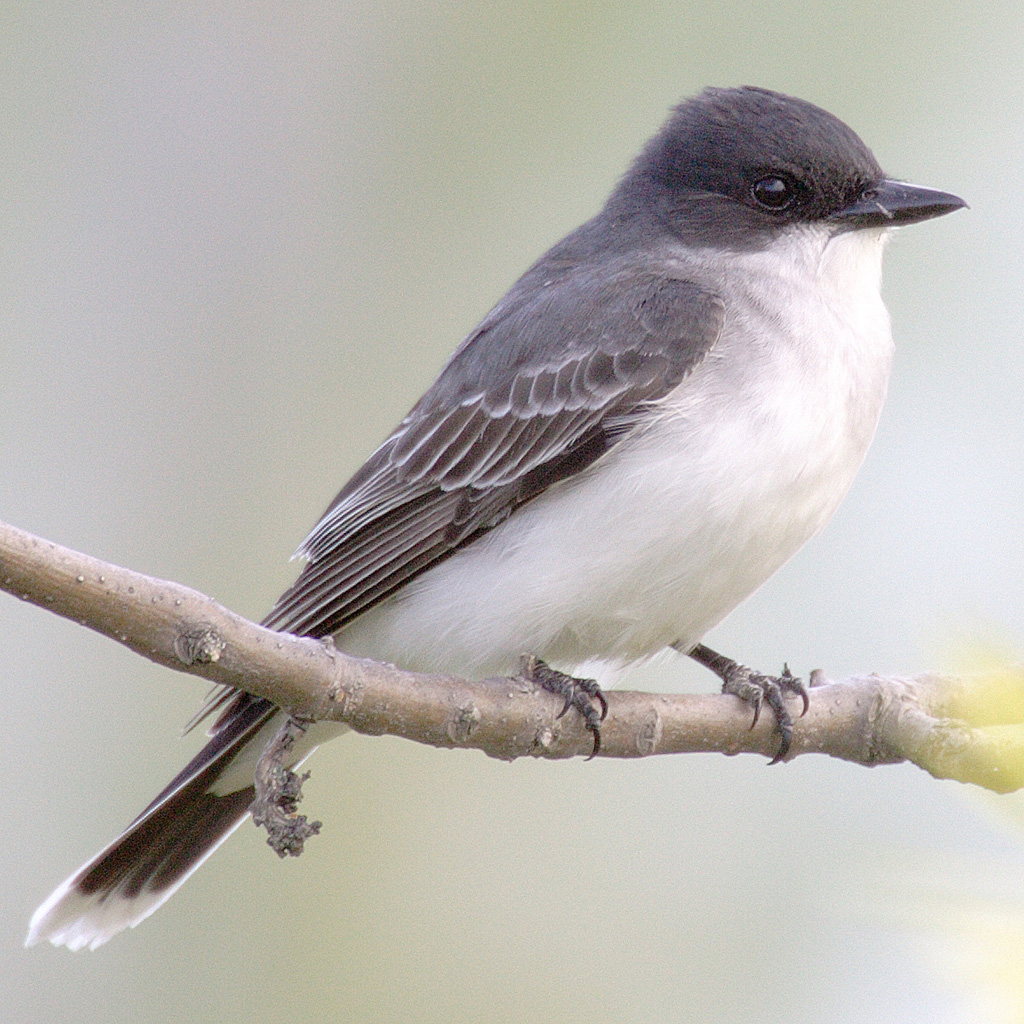
Eastern kingbird

Order: Passeriformes Family: Tyrannidae

Tyrant flycatchers are Passerine birds which occur throughout North and South America. They superficially resemble the Old World flycatchers, but are more robust and have stronger bills. They do not have the sophisticated vocal capabilities of the songbirds. Most, but not all, are rather plain. As the name implies, most are insectivorous.

- Northern beardless-tyrannulet, Camptostoma imberbe LC
- Greenish elaenia, Myiopagis viridicata (A) LC
- Small-billed elaenia, Elaenia parvirostris (A) LC
- Caribbean elaenia, Elaenia martinica (Puerto Rico, U.S. Virgin Islands) LC
- White-crested elaenia, Elaenia albiceps (A) LC
- Dusky-capped flycatcher, Myiarchus tuberculifer LC+
- Ash-throated flycatcher, Myiarchus cinerascens LC
- Nutting's flycatcher, Myiarchus nuttingi LC
- Great crested flycatcher, Myiarchus crinitus LC
- Brown-crested flycatcher, Myiarchus tyrannulus LC
- La Sagra's flycatcher, Myiarchus sagrae LC
- Stolid flycatcher, Myiarchus stolidus (U.S. Virgin Islands) (A) LC
- Puerto Rican flycatcher, Myiarchus antillarum (Puerto Rico) (EP) LC
- Great kiskadee, Pitangus sulphuratus LC
- Social flycatcher, Myiozetetes similis (A) LC
- Sulphur-bellied flycatcher, Myiodynastes luteiventris LC
- Piratic flycatcher, Legatus leucophaius (C) LC
- Variegated flycatcher, Empidonomus varius (A) LC
- Crowned slaty flycatcher, Empidonomus aurantioatrocristatus (A) LC
- Tropical kingbird, Tyrannus melancholicus LC
- Couch's kingbird, Tyrannus couchii LC
- Cassin's kingbird, Tyrannus vociferans LC
- Thick-billed kingbird, Tyrannus crassirostris LC
- Western kingbird, Tyrannus verticalis LC
- Eastern kingbird, Tyrannus tyrannus LC
- Gray kingbird, Tyrannus dominicensis LC
- Loggerhead kingbird, Tyrannus caudifasciatus (A) LC
- Scissor-tailed flycatcher, Tyrannus forficatus LC
- Fork-tailed flycatcher, Tyrannus savana LC
- Tufted flycatcher, Mitrephanes phaeocercus (C) LC
- Olive-sided flycatcher, Contopus cooperi NT
- Greater pewee, Contopus pertinax LC
- Western wood-pewee, Contopus sordidulus LC
- Eastern wood-pewee, Contopus virens LC
- Cuban pewee, Contopus caribaeus (A) LC
- Hispaniolan pewee, Contopus hispaniolensis (Puerto Rico) (A) LC
- Lesser Antillean pewee, Contopus latirostris (Puerto Rico) LC
- Yellow-bellied flycatcher, Empidonax flaviventris LC
- Acadian flycatcher, Empidonax virescens LC
- Alder flycatcher, Empidonax alnorum LC
- Willow flycatcher, Empidonax traillii LC
- Least flycatcher, Empidonax minimus LC
- Hammond's flycatcher, Empidonax hammondii LC
- Gray flycatcher, Empidonax wrightii LC
- Dusky flycatcher, Empidonax oberholseri LC
- Pine flycatcher, Empidonax affinis (A) LC
- Western flycatcher, Empidonax difficilis LC
- Black phoebe, Sayornis nigricans LC
- Eastern phoebe, Sayornis phoebe LC
- Say's phoebe, Sayornis saya LC
- Vermilion flycatcher, Pyrocephalus rubinus LC

== Vireos, shrike-babblers, and erpornis ==
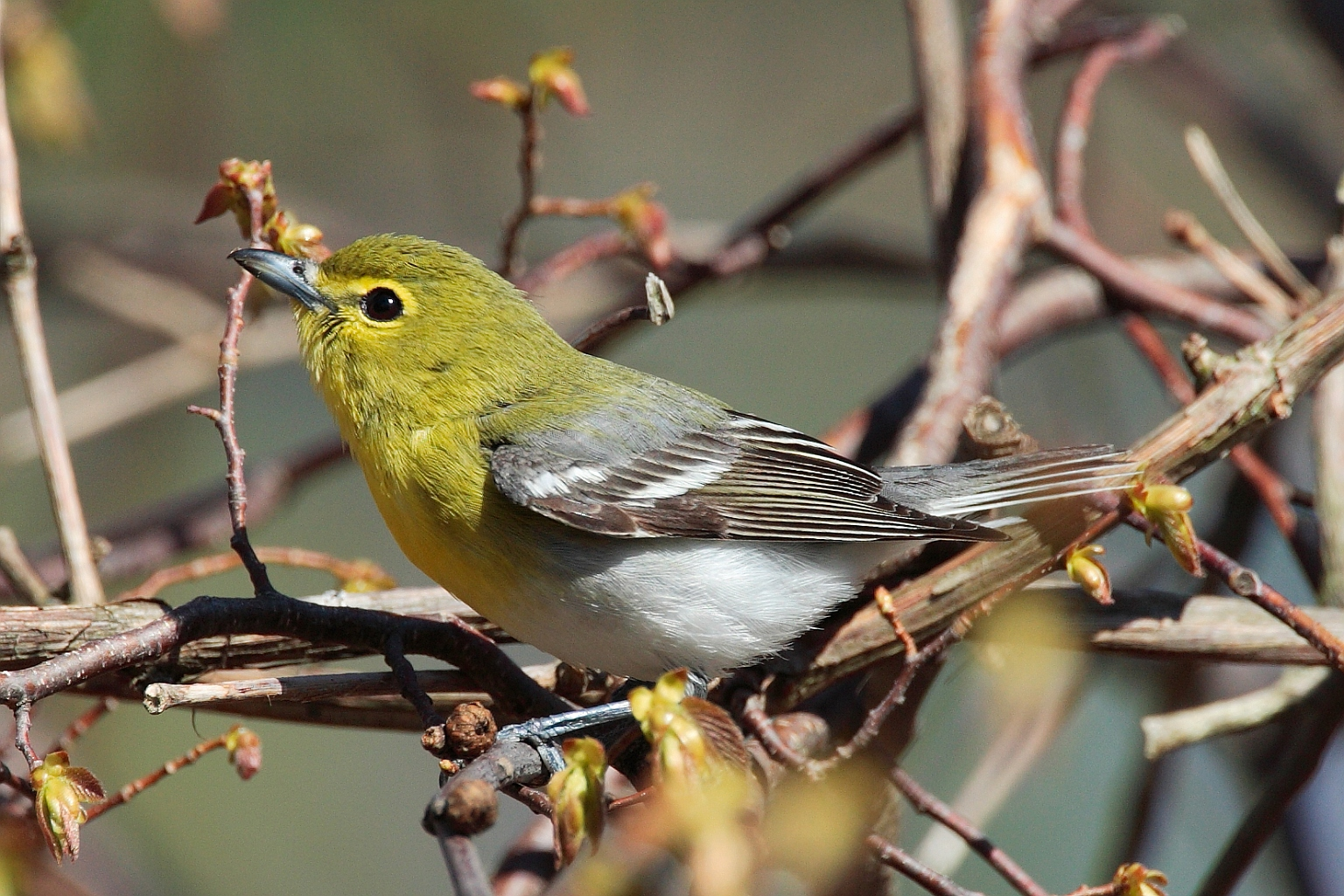
Yellow-throated vireo

Order: Passeriformes Family: Vireonidae

The vireos are a group of small to medium-sized passerine birds mostly restricted to the New World, though a few other species in the family are found in Asia. They are typically greenish in color and resemble wood-warblers apart from their heavier bills.

- Black-capped vireo, Vireo atricapilla NT
- White-eyed vireo, Vireo griseus LC
- Thick-billed vireo, Vireo crassirostris (C) LC
- Cuban vireo, Vireo gundlachii (A) LC
- Puerto Rican vireo, Vireo latimeri (Puerto Rico) (EP) LC
- Bell's vireo, Vireo bellii LC
- Gray vireo, Vireo vicinior LC
- Hutton's vireo, Vireo huttoni LC
- Yellow-throated vireo, Vireo flavifrons LC
- Cassin's vireo, Vireo cassinii LC
- Blue-headed vireo, Vireo solitarius LC
- Plumbeous vireo, Vireo plumbeus LC
- Philadelphia vireo, Vireo philadelphicus LC
- Warbling vireo, Vireo gilvus LC
- Red-eyed vireo, Vireo olivaceus LC
- Yellow-green vireo, Vireo flavoviridis LC
- Black-whiskered vireo, Vireo altiloquus LC
- Yucatan vireo, Vireo magister (A) LC

== Monarch flycatchers ==
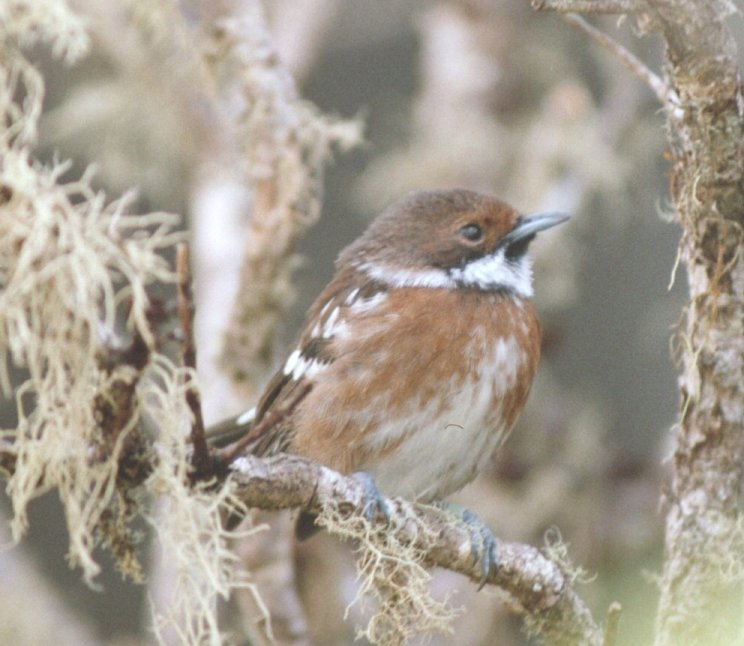
Hawaii elepaio

Order: Passeriformes Family: Monarchidae

The Monarchinae are a relatively recent grouping of a number of seemingly very different birds, mostly from the Southern Hemisphere, which are more closely related than they at first appear. Many of the approximately 140 species making up the family were previously assigned to other groups, largely on the basis of general morphology or behavior. With the new insights generated by the DNA-DNA hybridisation studies of Sibley and his co-workers toward the end of the 20th century, however, it became clear that these apparently unrelated birds were all descended from a common ancestor. The Monarchinae are small to medium-sized insectivorous passerines, many of which hunt by flycatching.

Five of the species listed below (three species endemic to Hawaii, one species found in American Samoa, and one species endemic to the Northern Mariana Islands) represent the group in the United States. One species, the Guam flycatcher, is extinct because of the introduced brown tree snake on Guam.

- Kauai elepaio, Chasiempis sclateri (EH) VU
- Oahu elepaio, Chasiempis ibidis (EH) EN
- Hawaii elepaio, Chasiempis sandwichensis (EH) VU
- Fiji shrikebill, Clytorhynchus vitiensi (American Samoa) LC
- Tinian monarch, Monarcha takatsukasae (Northern Mariana Islands) (ENM) VU
- Guam flycatcher, Myiagra freycineti (Guam) (EG) (E) EX

== Shrikes ==
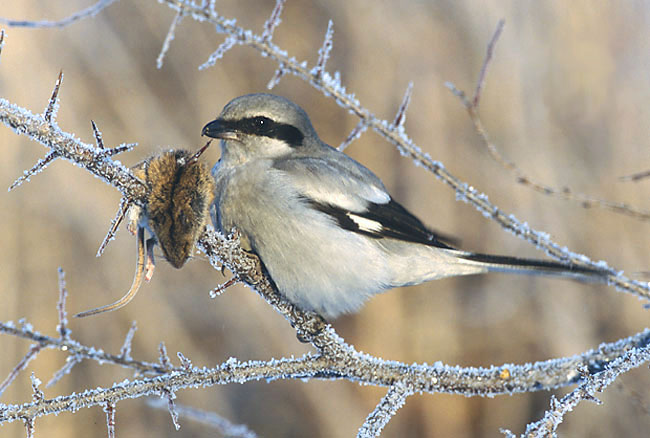
Northern shrike

Order: Passeriformes Family: Laniidae

Shrikes are passerine birds known for their habit of catching other birds and small animals and impaling the uneaten portions of their bodies on thorns. A shrike's beak is hooked, like that of a typical bird of prey.

- Brown shrike, Lanius cristatus (C) LC
- Red-backed shrike, Lanius collurio (A) LC
- Loggerhead shrike, Lanius ludovicianus NT
- Northern shrike, Lanius borealis LC

== Crows, jays, and magpies ==
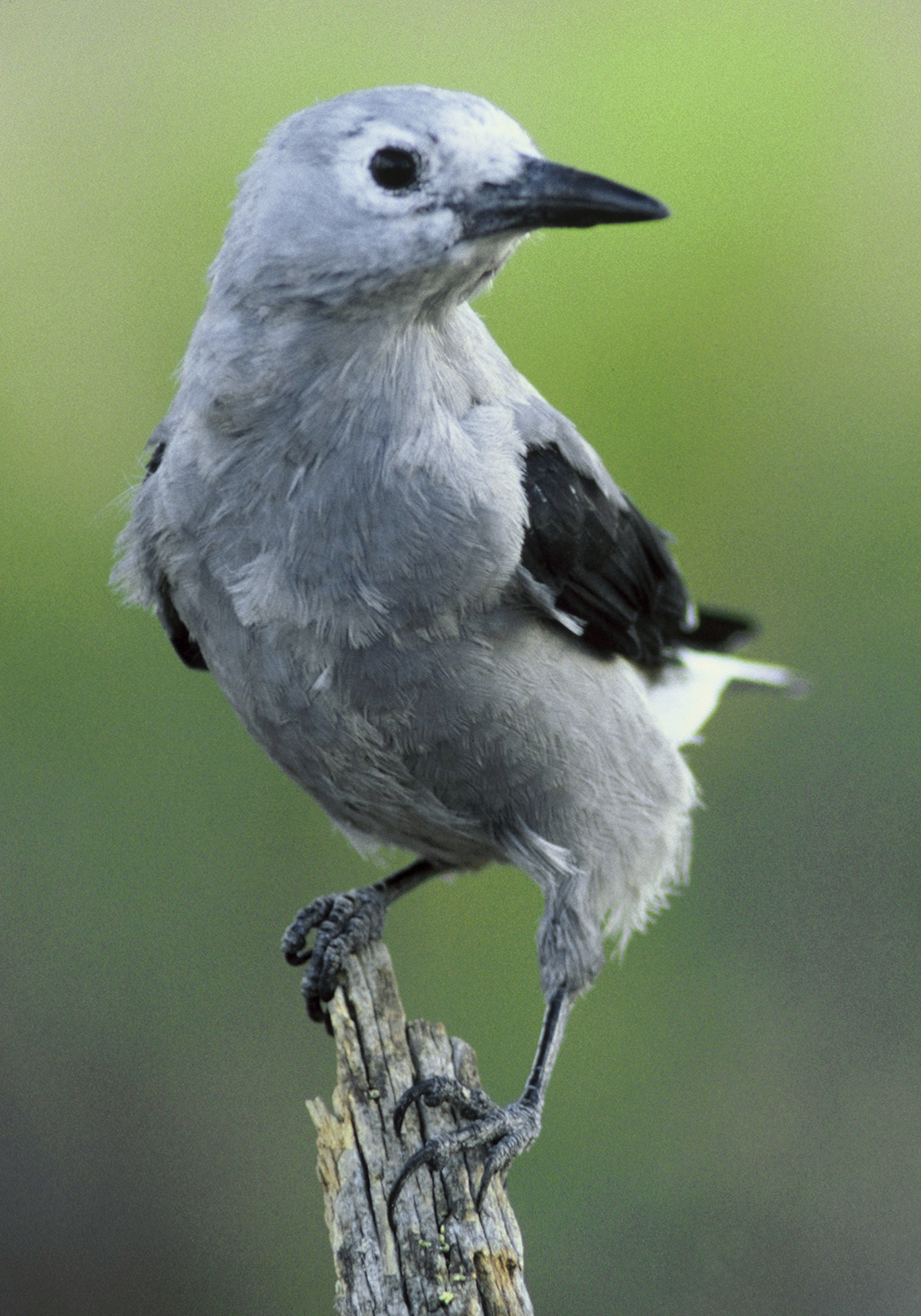
Clark's nutcracker

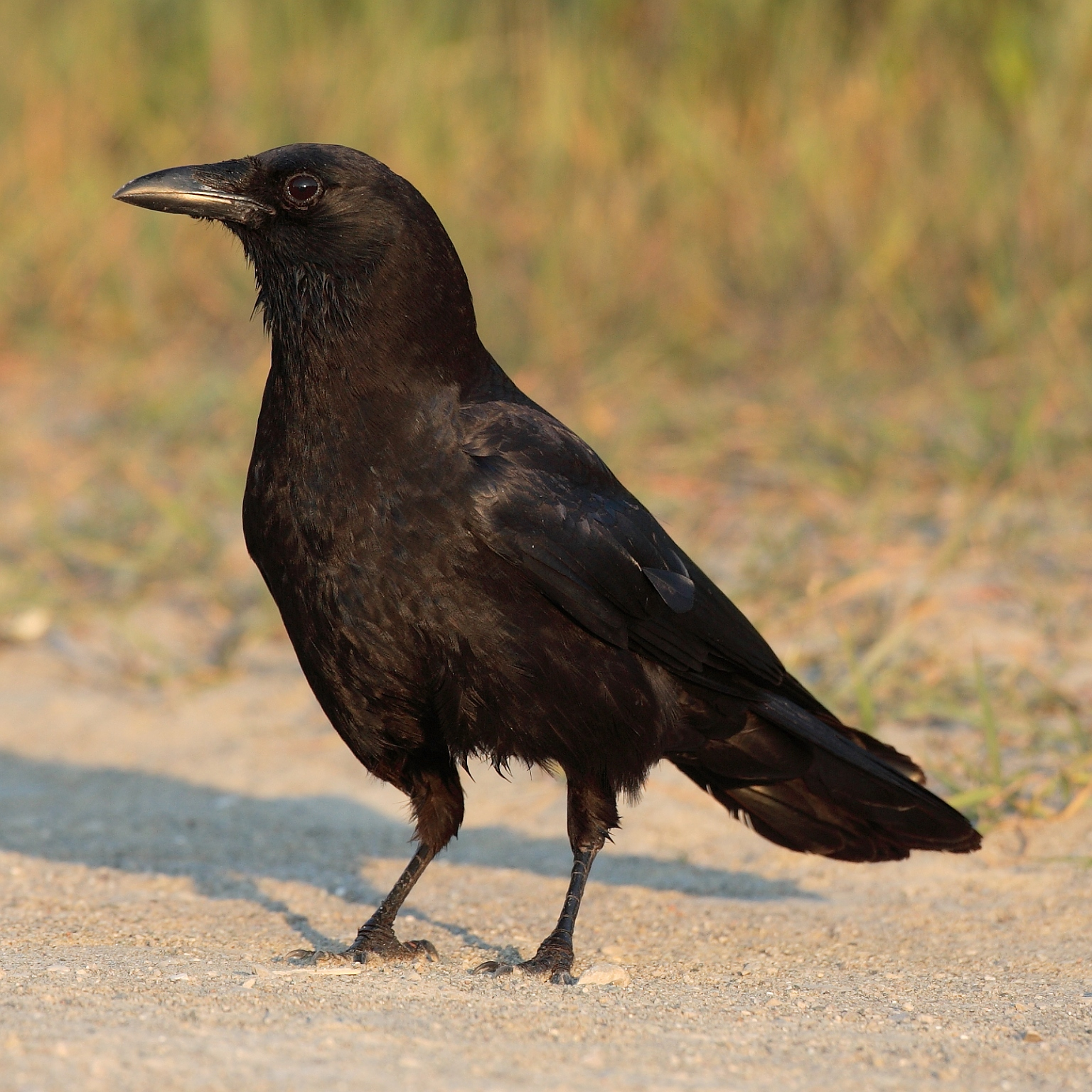
American crow

Order: Passeriformes Family: Corvidae

The family Corvidae includes crows, ravens, jays, choughs, magpies, treepies, nutcrackers, and ground jays. Corvids are above average in size among the Passeriformes, and some of the larger species show high levels of intelligence. Since about 2012, nesting fish crows have increasingly been documented in Canada along the northwest shore of Lake Ontario, so the species will probably soon no longer be considered endemic to the lower 48 U.S. states.

- Canada jay, Perisoreus canadensis LC
- Brown jay, Psilorhinus morio (C) LC
- Green jay, Cyanocorax yncas LC
- Pinyon jay, Gymnorhinus cyanocephalus VU
- Steller's jay, Cyanocitta stelleri LC
- Blue jay, Cyanocitta cristata LC
- Florida scrub-jay, Aphelocoma coerulescens (EM) VU
- Island scrub-jay, Aphelocoma insularis (EM) VU
- California scrub-jay, Aphelocoma californica (Not yet assessed by the IUCN)
- Woodhouse's scrub-jay, Aphelocoma woodhouseii (Not yet assessed by the IUCN)
- Mexican jay, Aphelocoma wollweberi LC
- Clark's nutcracker, Nucifraga columbiana LC
- Black-billed magpie, Pica hudsonia LC
- Yellow-billed magpie, Pica nuttalli (EM) VU
- Eurasian jackdaw, Corvus monedula (C) LC
- Mariana crow, Corvus kubaryi (Guam, Northern Mariana Islands) CR
- American crow, Corvus brachyrhynchos LC
- White-necked crow, Corvus leucognaphalus (U.S. Minor Outlying Islands, Puerto Rico) (Ex) VU
- Tamaulipas crow, Corvus imparatus LC
- Fish crow, Corvus ossifragus (EM) LC
- Hawaiian crow, Corvus hawaiiensis (EH) EW
- Chihuahuan raven, Corvus cryptoleucus (A) LC
- Common raven, Corvus corax LC

== Penduline-tits ==
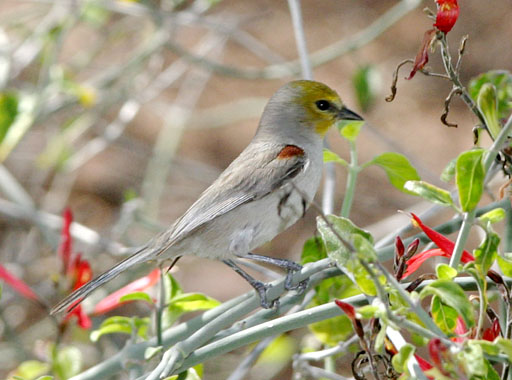
Verdin

Order: Passeriformes Family: Remizidae

The only member of this family in the New World, the verdin is one of the smallest passerines in North America. It is gray overall and adults have a bright yellow head and rufous "shoulder patch" (the lesser coverts). Verdins are insectivorous, continuously foraging among the desert trees and scrubs. They are usually solitary except when they pair up to construct their conspicuous nests.

- Verdin, Auriparus flaviceps LC

== Tits, chickadees, and titmice ==
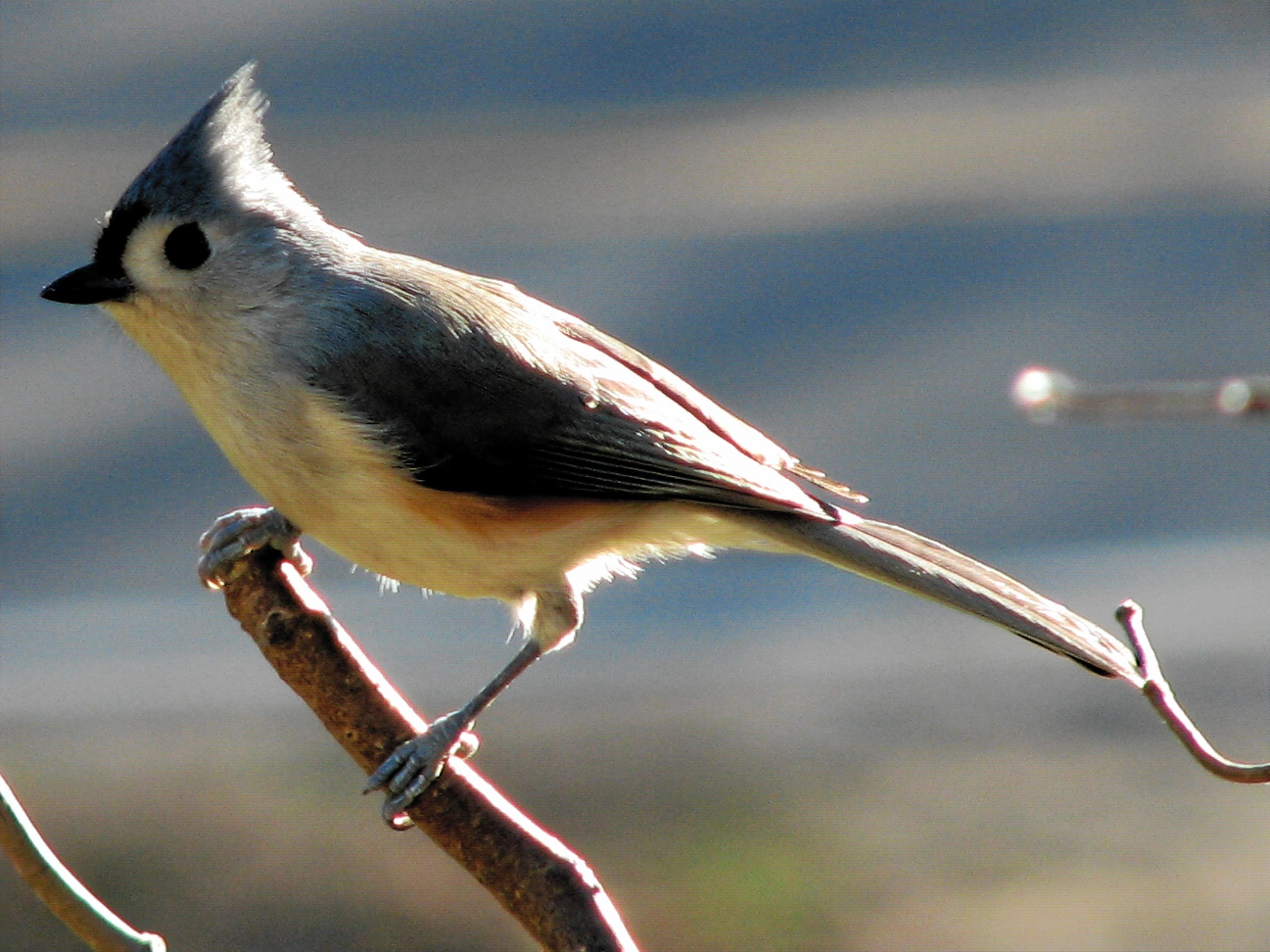
Tufted titmouse

Order: Passeriformes Family: Paridae

The Paridae are mainly small stocky woodland species with short stout bills. Some have crests. They are adaptable birds, with a mixed diet including seeds and insects.

- Carolina chickadee, Poecile carolinensis (EM) LC
- Black-capped chickadee, Poecile atricapillus LC
- Mountain chickadee, Poecile gambeli LC
- Mexican chickadee, Poecile sclateri LC
- Chestnut-backed chickadee, Poecile rufescens LC
- Boreal chickadee, Poecile hudsonicus LC
- Gray-headed chickadee, Poecile cinctus LC
- Bridled titmouse, Baeolophus wollweberi LC
- Oak titmouse, Baeolophus inornatus LC
- Juniper titmouse, Baeolophus ridgwayi LC
- Tufted titmouse, Baeolophus bicolor LC
- Black-crested titmouse, Baeolophus atricristatus LC

== Larks ==
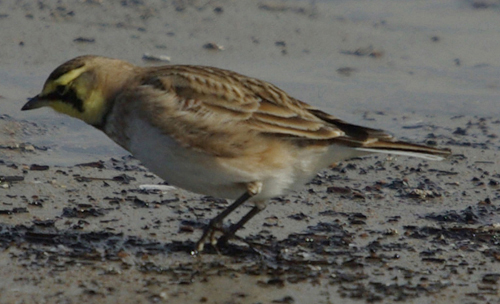
Horned lark

Order: Passeriformes Family: Alaudidae

Larks are small terrestrial birds with often extravagant songs and display flights. Most larks are fairly dull in appearance. Their food is insects and seeds.

- Eurasian skylark, Alauda arvensis (see note for occurrence) (Note: In the U.S., the Eurasian skylark is introduced and resident in Hawaii and San Juan Island, Washington. It is a rare summer visitor to Alaska and has bred there, and is an accidental visitor to California and the minor outlying islands in the Pacific.) LC
- Horned lark, Eremophila alpestris LC

== Reed warblers and allies ==
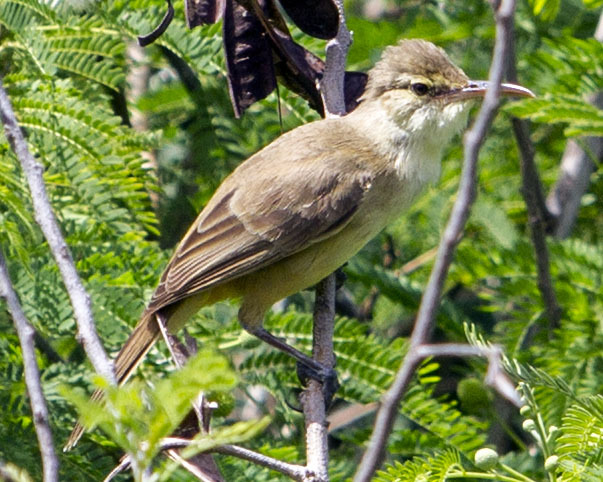
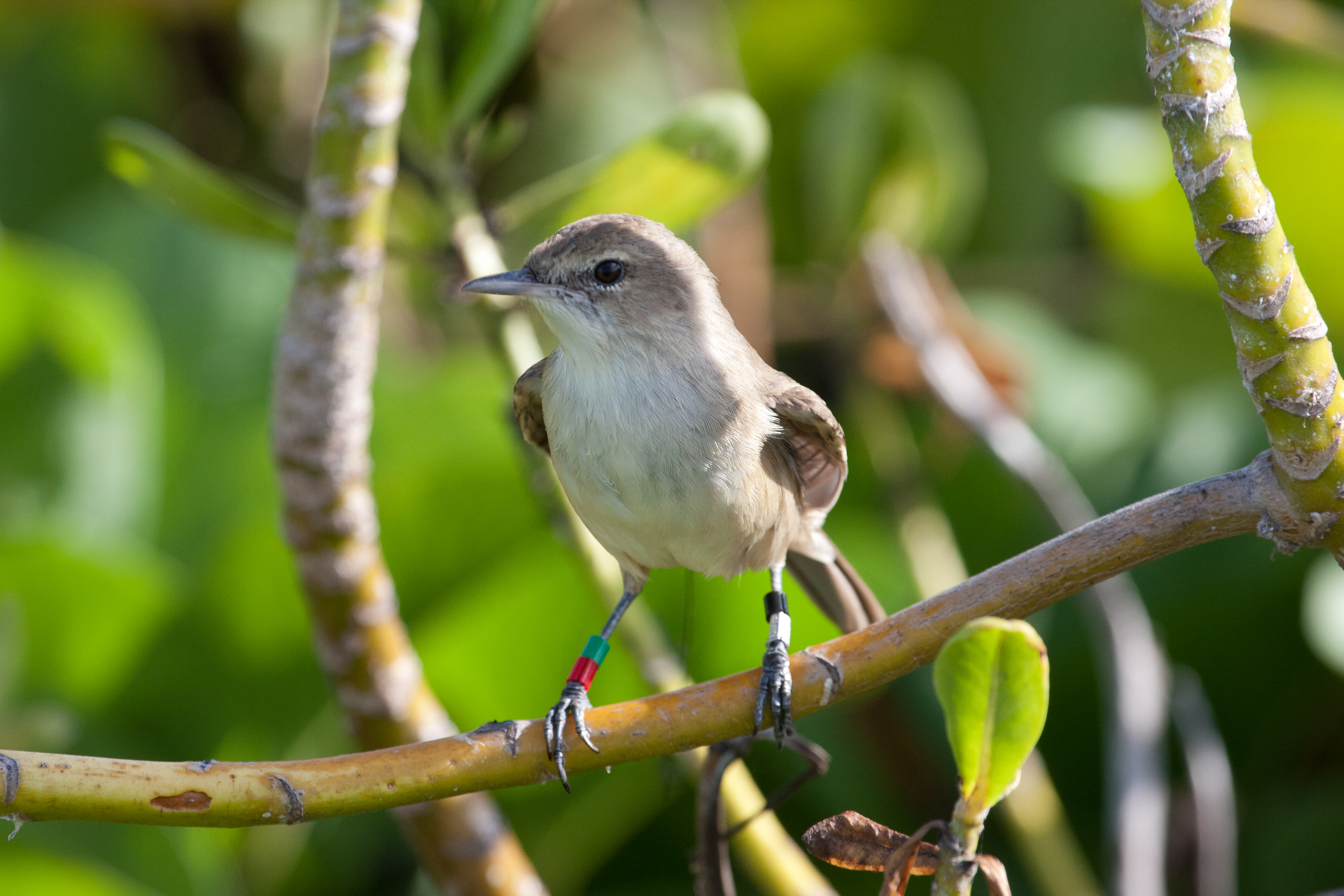
Left: Saipan reed warbler; Right: Millerbird

Order: Passeriformes Family: Acrocephalidae

The members of this family are usually rather large for "warblers". Most are rather plain olivaceous brown above with much yellow to beige below. They are usually found in open woodland, reedbeds, or tall grass. The family occurs mostly in southern to western Eurasia and surroundings, but also ranges far into the Pacific, with some species in Africa.

- Icterine warbler, Hippolais icterina (A)
- Thick-billed warbler, Arundinax aedon (A) LC
- Millerbird, Acrocephalus familiaris (EH) CR
- Sedge warbler, Acrocephalus schoenobaenus (A) LC
- Icterine warbler, Acrocephalus icterina (A) LC
- Blyth's reed warbler, Acrocephalus dumetorum (A) LC
- Nightingale reed warbler, Acrocephalus luscinius (Guam) (EG) (E) EX
- Saipan reed warbler, Acrocephalus hiwae (Northern Mariana Islands) (ENM) EN
- Aguiguan reed warbler, Acrocephalus nijoi (Northern Mariana Islands) (ENM) (E) EX
- Pagan reed warbler, Acrocephalus yamashinae (Northern Mariana Islands) (ENM) (E) EX

== Grassbirds and allies ==
Order: Passeriformes Family: Locustellidae

Locustellidae are a family of small insectivorous songbirds found mainly in Eurasia, Africa, and the Australian region. They are smallish birds with tails that are usually long and pointed, and tend to be drab brownish or buffy all over.

- Pallas's grasshopper warbler, Helopsaltes certhiola (A) LC
- Middendorff's grasshopper warbler, Helopsaltes ochotensis (C) LC
- Lanceolated warbler, Locustella lanceolata (A) LC
- River warbler, Locustella fluviatilis (A) LC

== Swallows ==
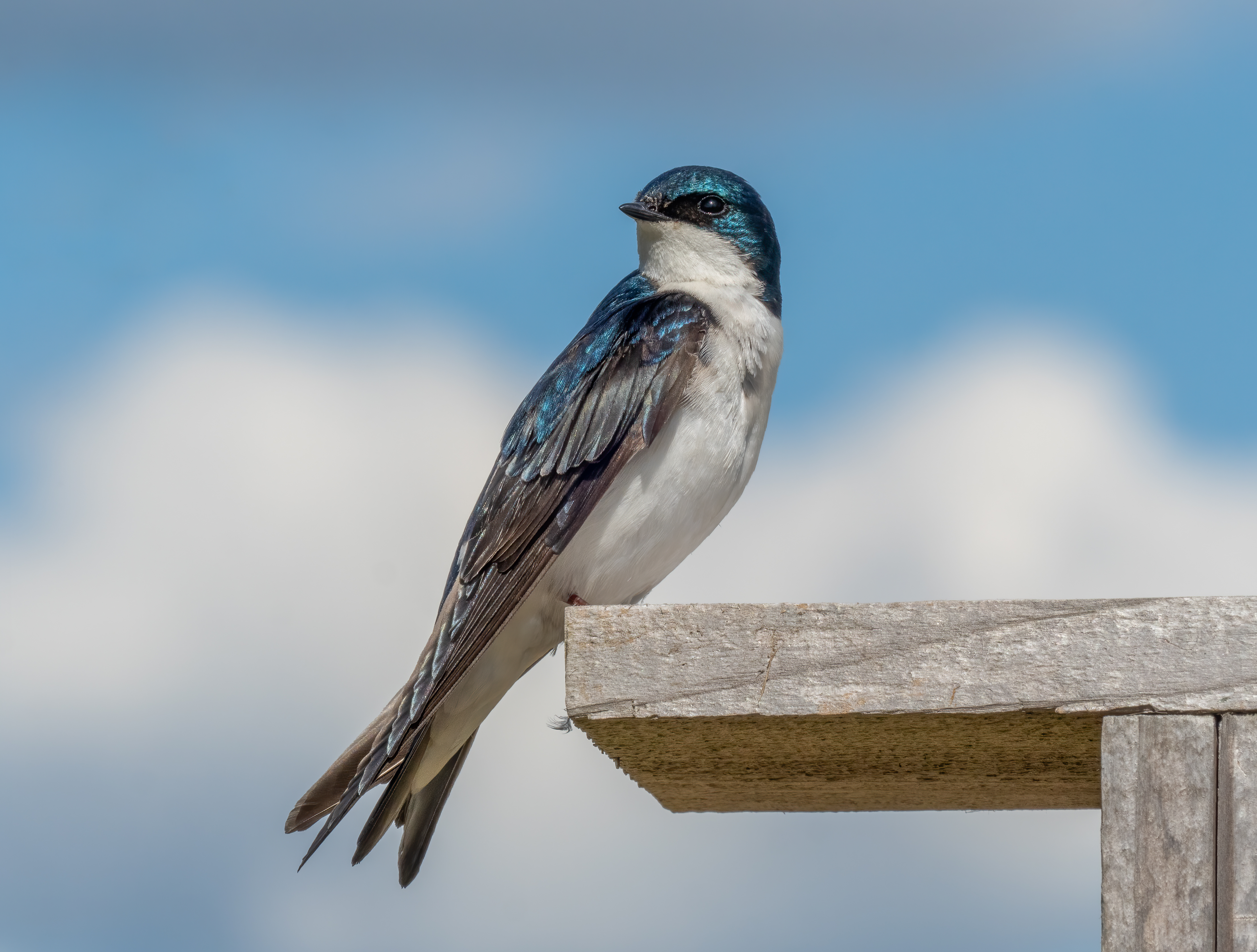
Tree swallow

Order: Passeriformes Family: Hirundinidae

The family Hirundinidae is adapted to aerial feeding. They have a slender streamlined body, long pointed wings, and a short bill with a wide gape. The feet are adapted to perching rather than walking, and the front toes are partially joined at the base.

- Bank swallow, Riparia riparia LC
- Tree swallow, Tachycineta bicolor LC
- Bahama swallow, Tachycineta cyaneoviridis (C) EN
- Violet-green swallow, Tachycineta thalassina LC
- Mangrove swallow, Tachycineta albilinea (A) LC
- Northern rough-winged swallow, Stelgidopteryx serripennis LC
- Brown-chested martin, Progne tapera (A) LC
- Purple martin, Progne subis LC
- Southern martin, Progne elegans (A) LC
- Gray-breasted martin, Progne chalybea (A) LC
- Cuban martin, Progne cryptoleuca (A) LC
- Caribbean martin, Progne dominicensis (Puerto Rico, U.S. Virgin Islands) LC
- Barn swallow, Hirundo rustica LC
- Common house-martin, Delichon urbica (C) LC
- Cliff swallow, Petrochelidon pyrrhonota LC
- Cave swallow, Petrochelidon fulva LC

== Long-tailed tits ==
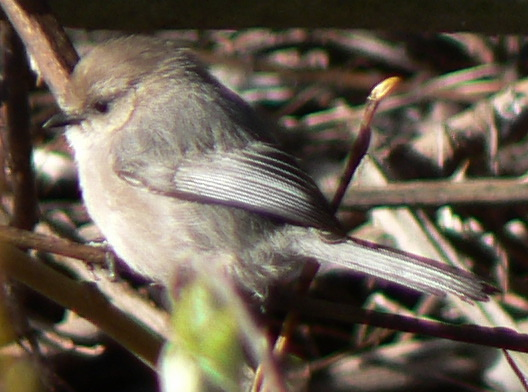
Bushtit

Order: Passeriformes Family: Aegithalidae

The long-tailed tits are a family of small passerine birds with medium to long tails. They make woven bag nests in trees. Most eat a mixed diet which includes insects.

- Bushtit, Psaltriparus minimus LC

== Bush warblers and allies ==
Order: Passeriformes Family: Scotocercidae

The members of this family are found throughout Africa, Asia, and Polynesia.

- Japanese bush-warbler, Horornis diphone (I) LC

== Leaf warblers ==
Order: Passeriformes Family: Phylloscopidae

Leaf warblers are a family of small insectivorous birds found mostly in Eurasia and ranging into Wallacea and Africa. The Arctic warbler breeds east into Alaska. The species are of various sizes, often green-plumaged above and yellow below, or more subdued with grayish-green to grayish-brown colors.

- Willow warbler, Phylloscopus trochilus (A) LC
- Common chiffchaff, Phylloscopus collybita (A) LC
- Wood warbler, Phylloscopus sibilatrix (A) LC
- Dusky warbler, Phylloscopus fuscatus (C) LC
- Pallas's leaf warbler, Phylloscopus proregulus (A) LC
- Yellow-browed warbler, Phylloscopus inornatus (C) LC
- Arctic warbler, Phylloscopus borealis LC
- Kamchatka leaf warbler, Phylloscopus examinandus (A) LC

== Bulbuls ==
Order: Passeriformes Family: Pycnonotidae

The bulbuls are a family of medium-sized passerine songbirds native to Africa and tropical Asia. These are noisy and gregarious birds with often beautiful striking songs.

- Red-vented bulbul, Pycnonotus cafer (I) LC
- Red-whiskered bulbul Pycnonotus jocosus (I) LC

== Sylviid warblers, parrotbills, and allies ==
Order: Passeriformes Family: Sylviidae

The family Sylviidae is a group of small insectivorous passerine birds. They mainly occur as breeding species, as the common name implies, in Europe, Asia, and to a lesser extent Africa. Most are of generally undistinguished appearance, but many have distinctive songs.

- Lesser whitethroat, Curruca curruca (A) LC
- Wrentit, Chamaea fasciata LC

== White-eyes, yuhinas, and allies ==
Order: Passeriformes Family: Zosteropidae

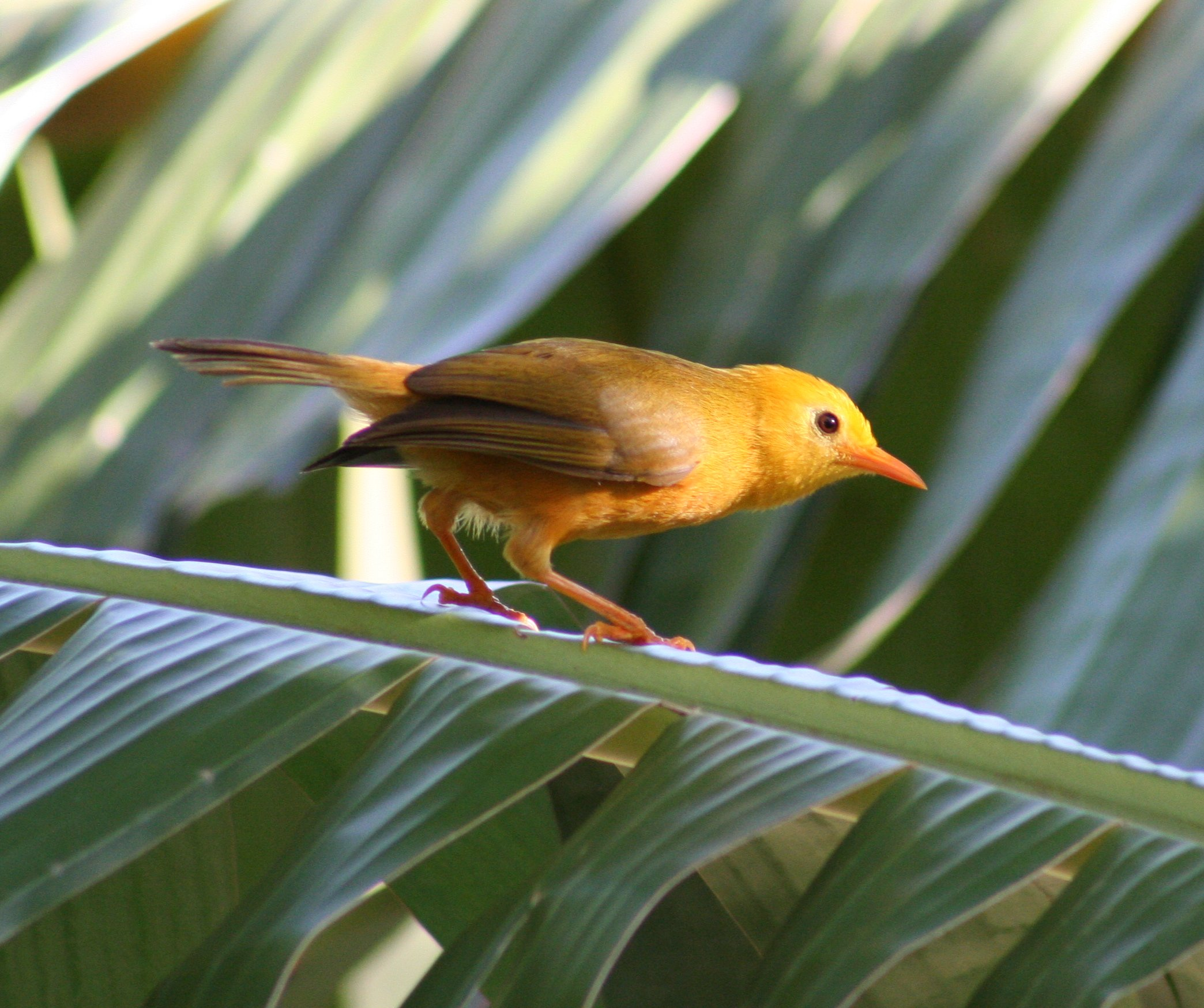
Golden white-eye

The white-eyes are small passerine birds native to tropical and sub-tropical Africa, southern Asia, and Australasia. The birds of this group are mostly of undistinguished appearance, their plumage above being generally some dull color like greenish-olive, but some species have a white or bright yellow throat, breast, or lower parts, and several have buff flanks. But as indicated by their scientific name, derived from the Ancient Greek for girdle-eye, there is a conspicuous ring around the eyes of many species. They have rounded wings and strong legs. The size ranges up to 15 cm (6 inches) in length. All the species of white-eyes are sociable, forming large flocks which only separate on the approach of the breeding season. Though mainly insectivorous, they eat nectar and fruits of various kinds.

- Golden white-eye, Cleptornis marchei (Northern Mariana Islands) (ENM) CR
- Warbling white-eye, Zosterops japonicus (I) LC
- Bridled white-eye, Zosterops conspicullatus(Northern Mariana Islands; Extirpated from Guam) (ENM) EN
- Rota white-eye, Zosterops rotensis (Northern Mariana Islands) (ENM) CR

== Laughingthrushes ==
Order: Passeriformes Family: Leiothrichidae

The laughingthrushes are a large family of Old World passerine birds. They are rather diverse in size and coloration, but are characterized by soft fluffy plumage. These birds have strong legs and many are quite terrestrial. This group is not strongly migratory and most species have short rounded wings and a weak flight.

- Greater necklaced laughingthrush, Garrulax pectoralis (I) LC
- Hwamei, Garrulax canorus (I) LC
- Red-billed leiothrix, Leiothrix lutea (I) LC

== Kinglets ==
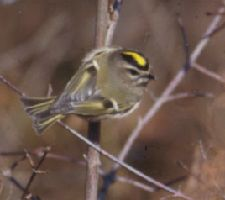
Golden-crowned kinglet

Order: Passeriformes Family: Regulidae

The kinglets and "crests" are a small family of birds which resemble some warblers. They are very small insectivorous birds in the single genus Regulus. The adults have colored crowns, giving rise to their name.

- Ruby-crowned kinglet, Corthylio calendula LC
- Golden-crowned kinglet, Regulus satrapa LC

== Waxwings ==
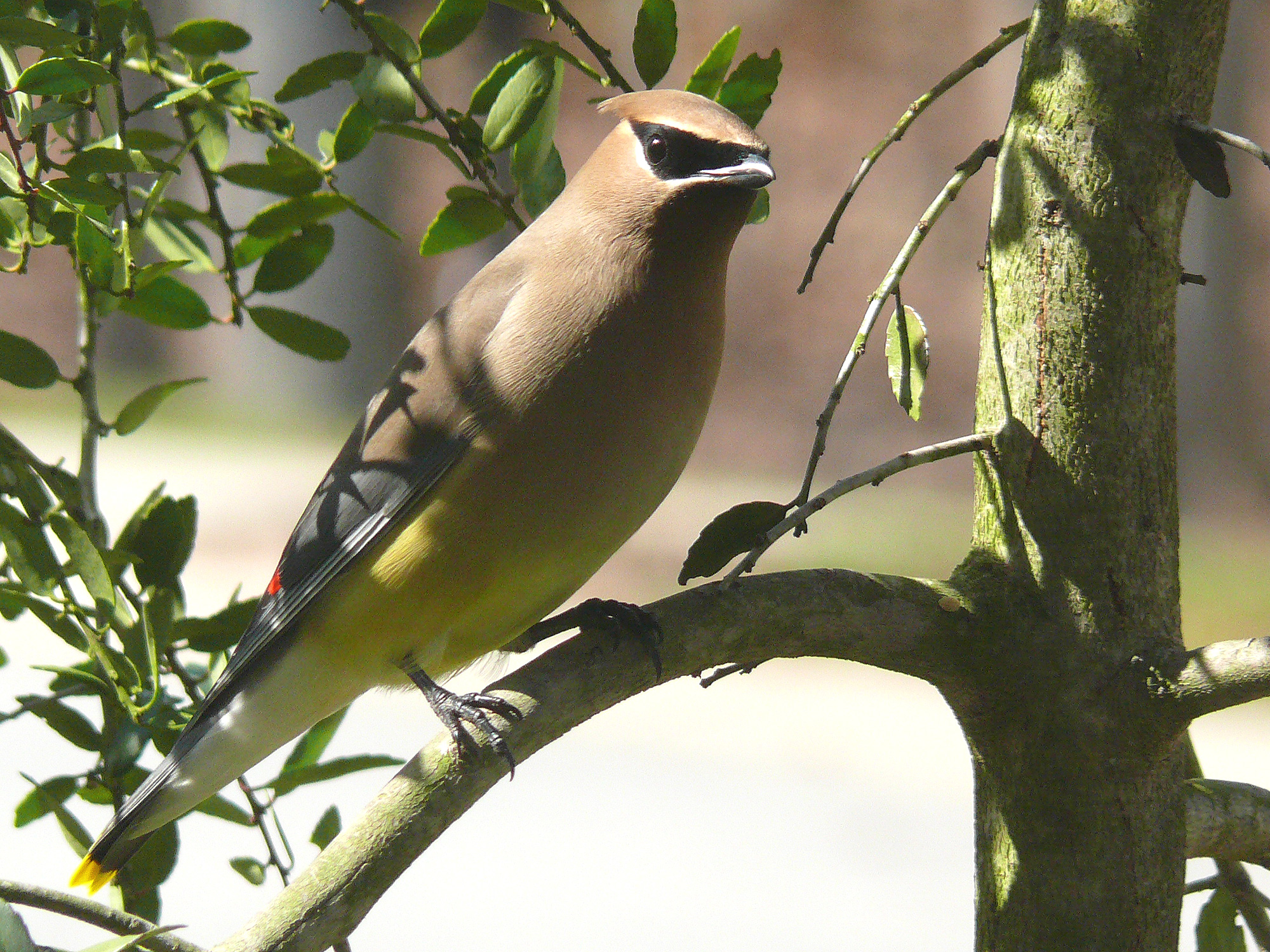
Cedar waxwing

Order: Passeriformes Family: Bombycillidae

The waxwings are a group of passerine birds with soft silky plumage and unique red tips to some of the wing feathers. In the Bohemian and cedar waxwings, these tips look like sealing wax and give the group its name. These are arboreal birds of northern forests. They live on insects in summer and berries in winter.

- Bohemian waxwing, Bombycilla garrulus LC
- Cedar waxwing, Bombycilla cedrorum LC

== Silky-flycatchers ==
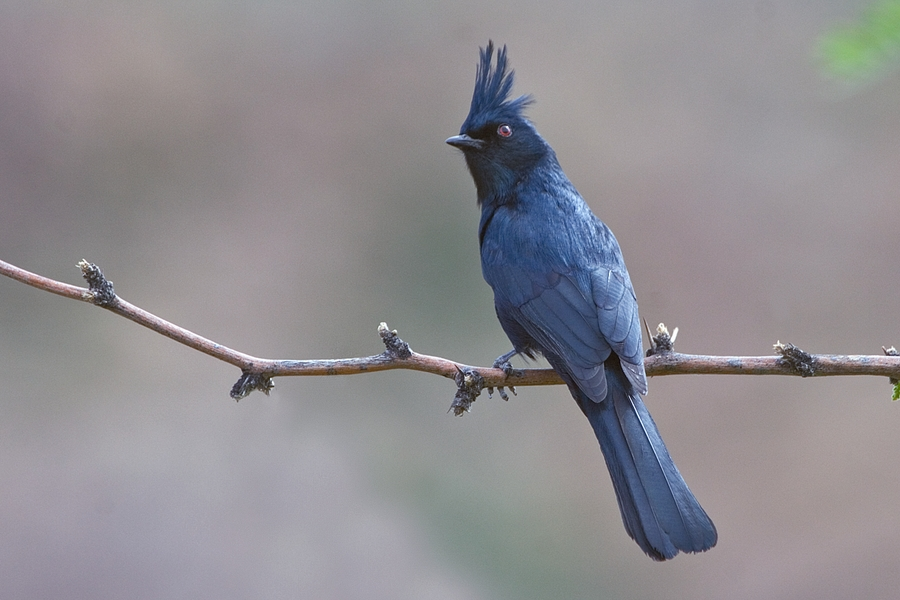
Phainopepla

Order: Passeriformes Family: Ptiliogonatidae

The silky-flycatchers are a small family of passerine birds which occur mainly in Central America. They are related to waxwings and most species have small crests.

- Gray silky-flycatcher, Ptiliogonys cinereus (A) LC
- Phainopepla, Phainopepla nitens LC

== Hawaiian honeyeaters ==
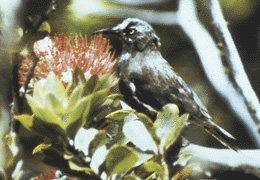
The extinct Kauai oo

Order: Passeriformes Family: Mohoidae

Hawaiian honeyeaters prefer to flit quickly from perch to perch in the outer foliage, stretching up or sideways or hanging upside down at need. They have a highly developed brush-tipped tongue, which is frayed and fringed with bristles which soak up liquids readily. The tongue is flicked rapidly and repeatedly into a flower, the upper mandible then compressing any liquid out when the bill is closed. All species of honeyeaters below were endemic to Hawaii, but are now extinct. The Kauai oo was the last species to survive, and was last seen in 1987.

- Kauai oo, Moho braccatus (EH) (E) EX
- Oahu oo, Moho apicalus (EH) (E) EX
- Bishop's oo, Moho bishopi (EH) (E) EX
- Hawaii oo, Moho nobilis (EH) (E) EX
- Kioea, Chaetoptila angustipluma (EH) (E) EX

== Nuthatches ==
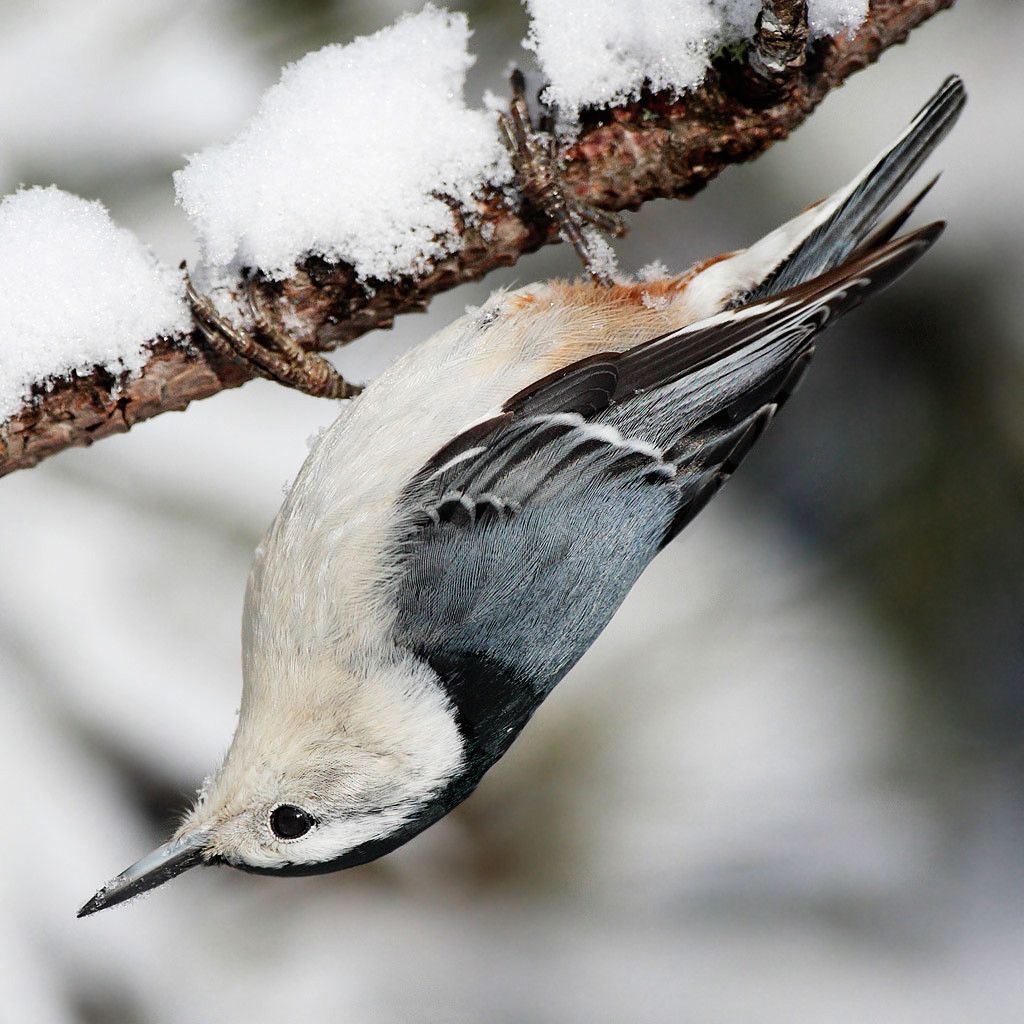
White-breasted nuthatch

Order: Passeriformes Family: Sittidae

Nuthatches are small woodland birds. They have the unusual ability to climb down trees head first, unlike other birds which can only go upwards. Nuthatches have big heads, short tails, and powerful bills and feet.

- Red-breasted nuthatch, Sitta canadensis LC
- White-breasted nuthatch, Sitta carolinensis LC
- Pygmy nuthatch, Sitta pygmaea LC
- Brown-headed nuthatch, Sitta pusilla (EM) LC

== Treecreepers ==
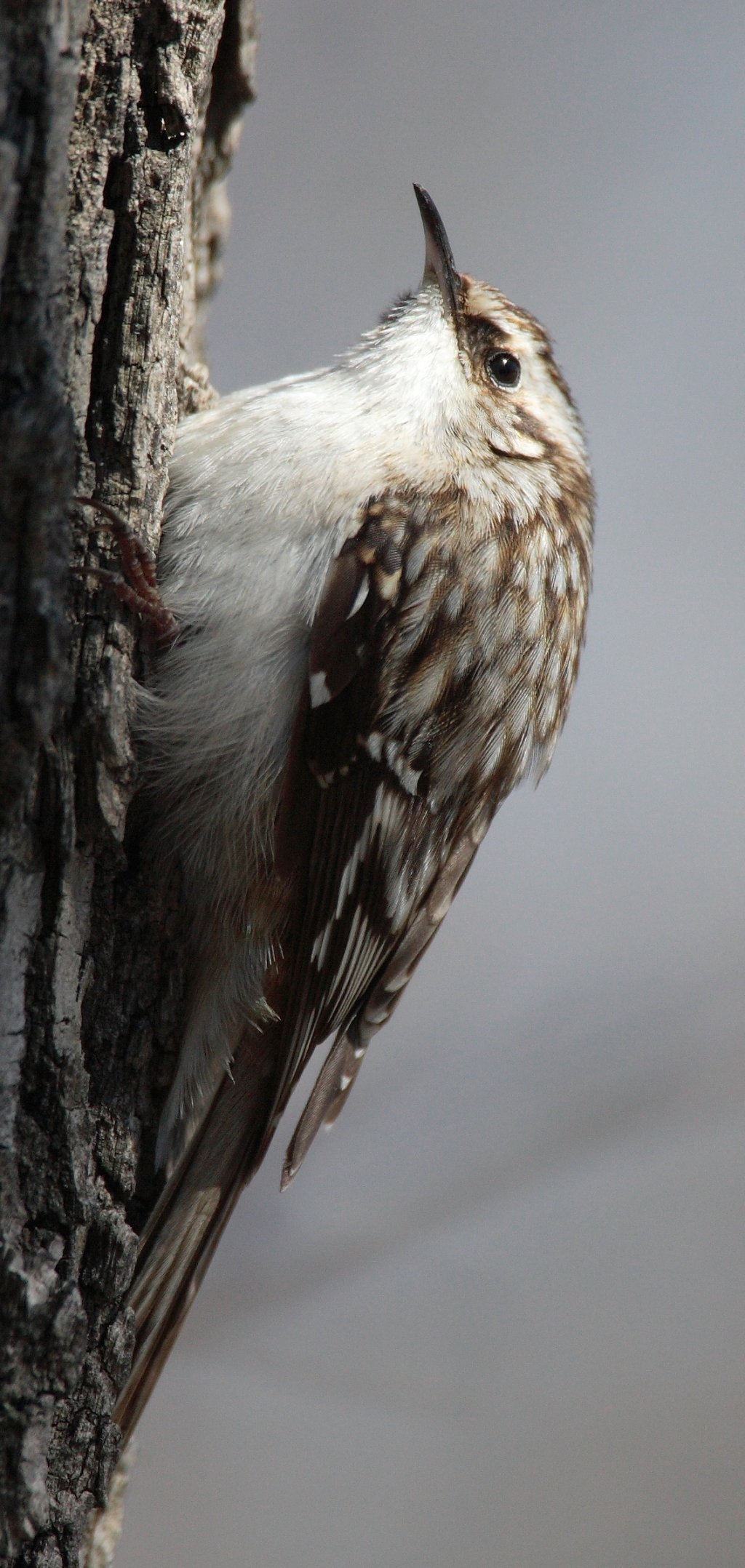
Brown creeper

Order: Passeriformes Family: Certhiidae

Treecreepers are small woodland birds, brown above and white below. They have thin pointed down-curved bills, which they use to extricate insects from bark. They have stiff tail feathers, like woodpeckers, which they use to support themselves on vertical trees.

- Brown creeper, Certhia americana LC

== Gnatcatchers ==
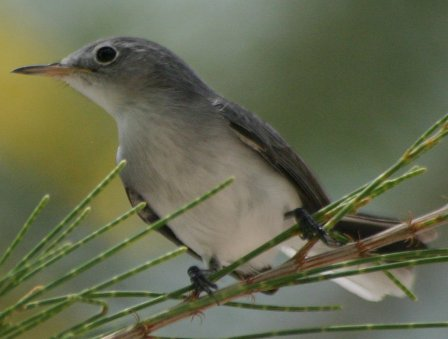
Blue-gray gnatcatcher

Order: Passeriformes Family: Polioptilidae

These dainty birds resemble Old World warblers in their structure and habits, moving restlessly through the foliage seeking insects. The gnatcatchers are mainly soft bluish gray in color and have the typical insectivore's long sharp bill. Many species have distinctive black head patterns (especially males) and long, regularly cocked, black-and-white tails.

- Blue-gray gnatcatcher, Polioptila caerulea LC
- Black-tailed gnatcatcher, Polioptila melanura LC
- California gnatcatcher, Polioptila californica LC
- Black-capped gnatcatcher, Polioptila nigriceps LC

== Wrens ==
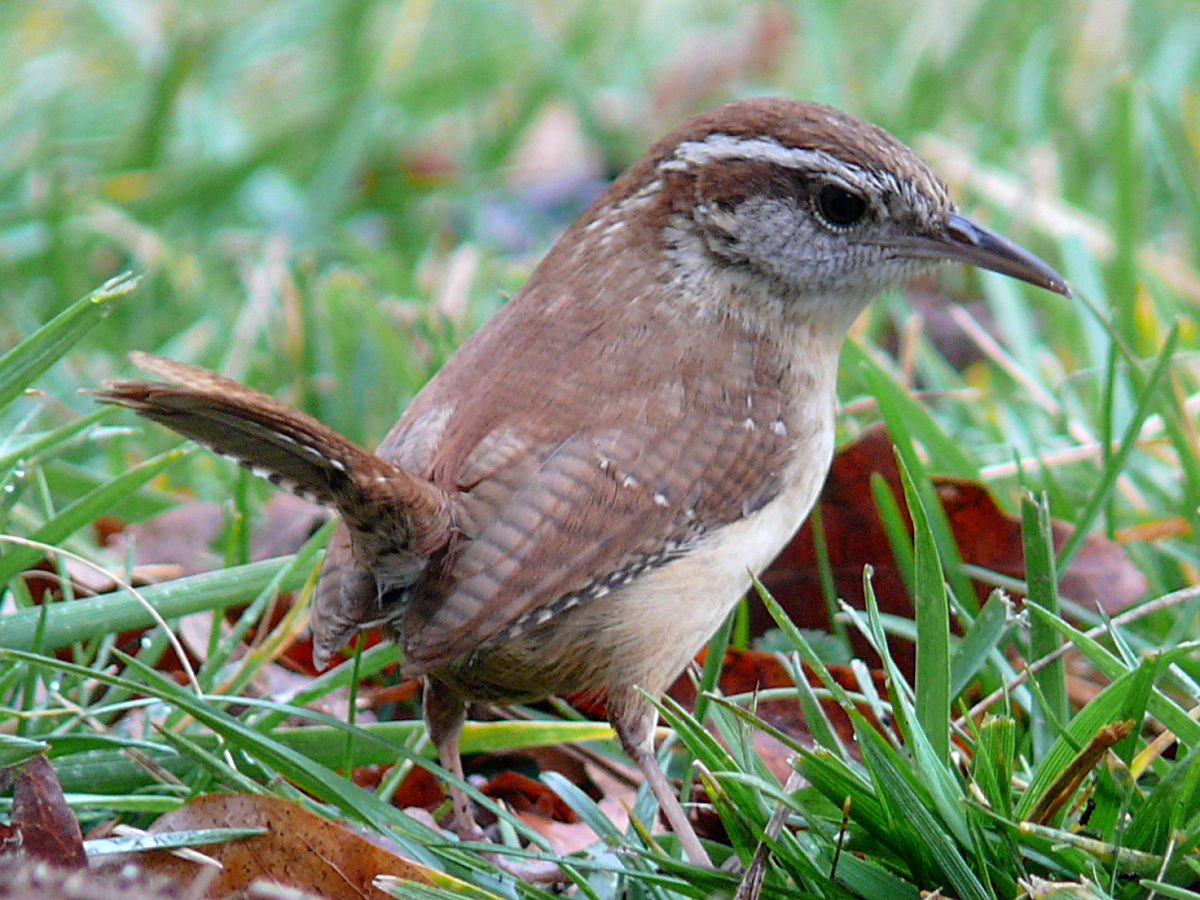
Carolina wren

Order: Passeriformes Family: Troglodytidae

Wrens are small and inconspicuous birds, except for their loud songs. They have short wings and thin down-turned bills. Several species often hold their tails upright. All are insectivorous.

- Rock wren, Salpinctes obsoletus LC
- Canyon wren, Catherpes mexicanus LC
- House wren, Troglodytes aedon LC
- Pacific wren, Troglodytes pacificus LC
- Winter wren, Troglodytes hiemalis LC
- Sedge wren, Cistothorus platensis LC
- Marsh wren, Cistothorus palustris LC
- Carolina wren, Thryothorus ludovicianus LC
- Bewick's wren, Thryomanes bewickii LC
- Cactus wren, Campylorhynchus brunneicapillus LC
- Sinaloa wren, Thryothorus sinaloa (A) LC

== Mockingbirds and thrashers ==
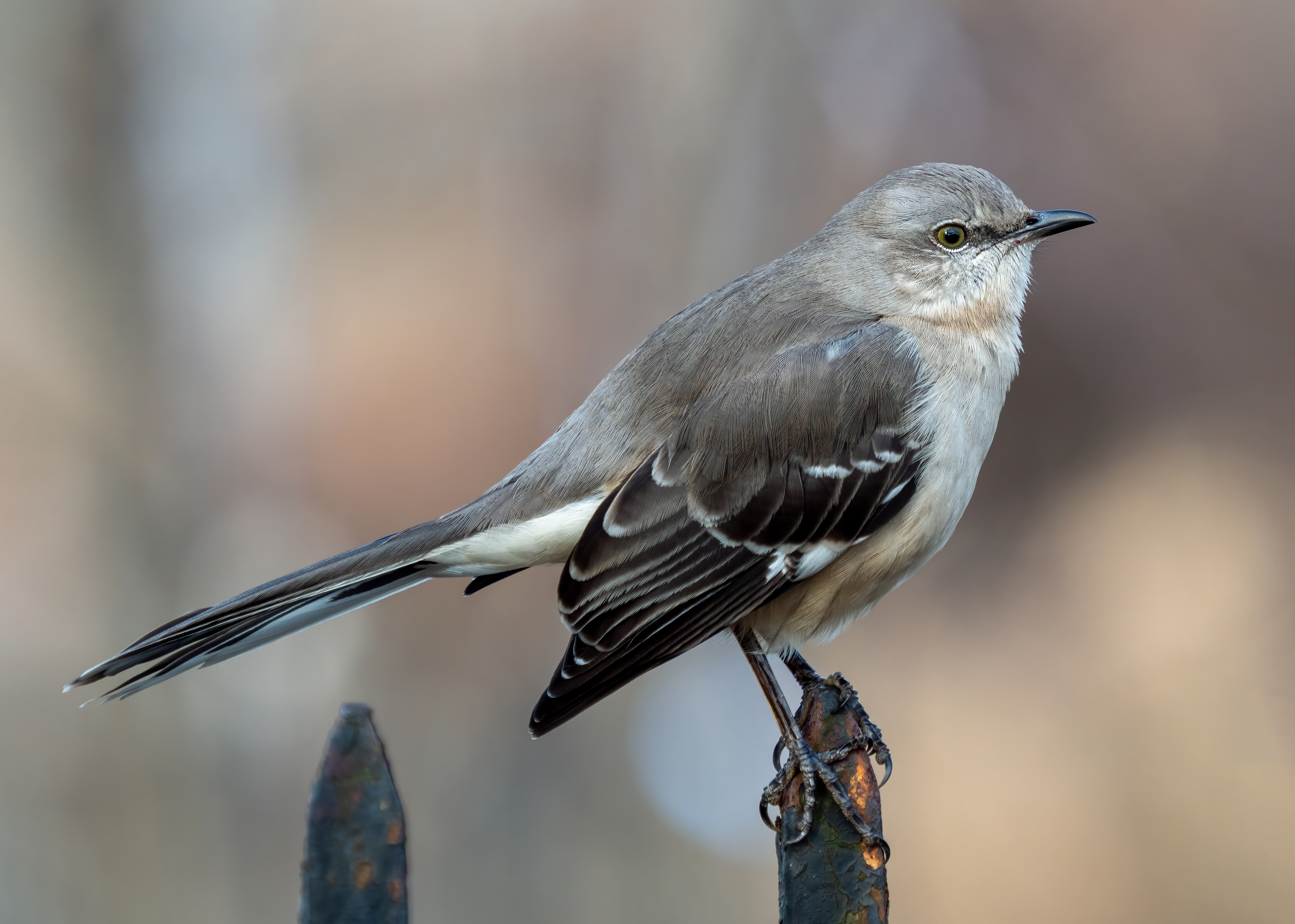
Northern mockingbird

Order: Passeriformes Family: Mimidae

The mimids are a family of passerine birds which includes thrashers, mockingbirds, tremblers, and the New World catbirds. These birds are notable for their vocalization, especially their remarkable ability to mimic a wide variety of birds and other sounds heard outdoors. The species tend towards dull grays and browns in their appearance.

- Blue mockingbird, Melanotis caerulescens (A) LC
- Gray catbird, Dumetella carolinensis LC
- Pearly-eyed thrasher, Margarops fuscatus (Puerto Rico) LC
- Curve-billed thrasher, Toxostoma curvirostre LC
- Brown thrasher, Toxostoma rufum LC
- Long-billed thrasher, Toxostoma longirostre LC
- Bendire's thrasher, Toxostoma bendirei VU
- California thrasher, Toxostoma redivivum LC
- LeConte's thrasher, Toxostoma lecontei LC
- Crissal thrasher, Toxostoma crissale LC
- Sage thrasher, Oreoscoptes montanus LC
- Bahama mockingbird, Mimus gundlachii (C) LC
- Northern mockingbird, Mimus polyglottos LC

== Starlings ==
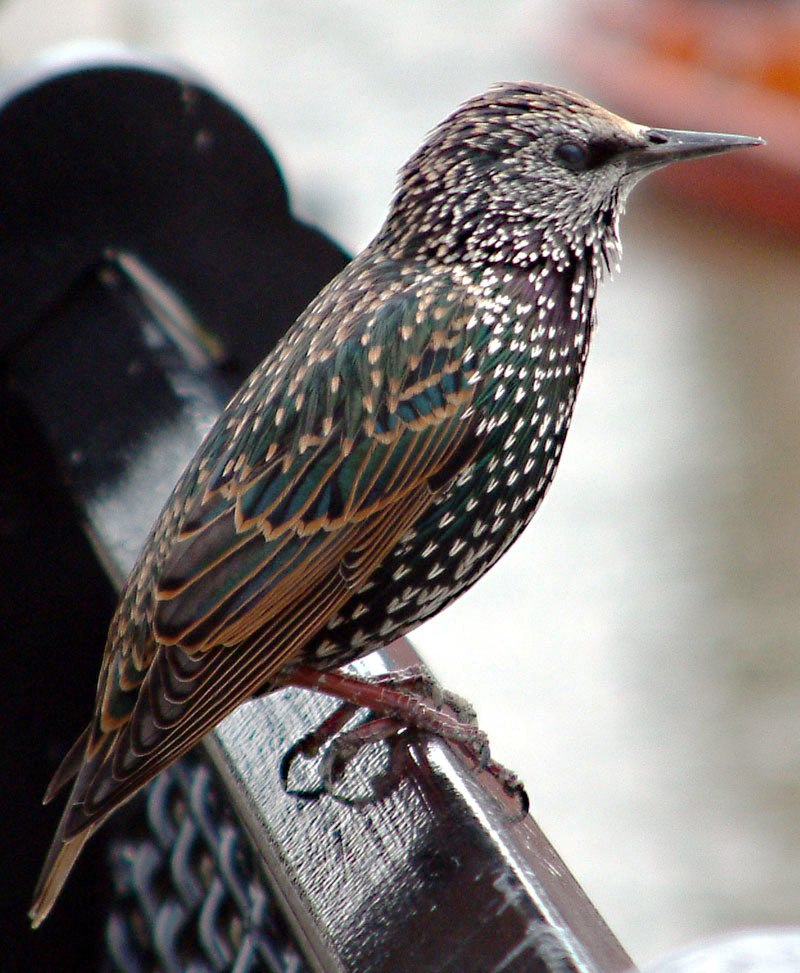
An immature female European starling

Order: Passeriformes Family: Sturnidae

Starlings and mynas are small to medium-sized Old World passerine birds with strong feet. Their flight is strong and direct and most are very gregarious. Their preferred habitat is fairly open country, and they eat insects and fruit. The plumage of several species is dark with a metallic sheen.

- Micronesian starling, Aplonis opaca (Guam, Northern Mariana Islands) (ENM / EG) LC
- Polynesian starling, Aplonis tabuensis (American Samoa) LC
- Samoan starling, Alponis atrifusca (American Samoa) LC
- European starling, Sturnus vulgaris (I) LC
- White-cheeked starling, Spodiopsar cineraceus (Northern Mariana Islands) (A) LC
- Common myna, Acridotheres tristis (I) LC
- Jungle myna, Acridotheres fuscus (American Samoa) (I) LC

== Dippers ==
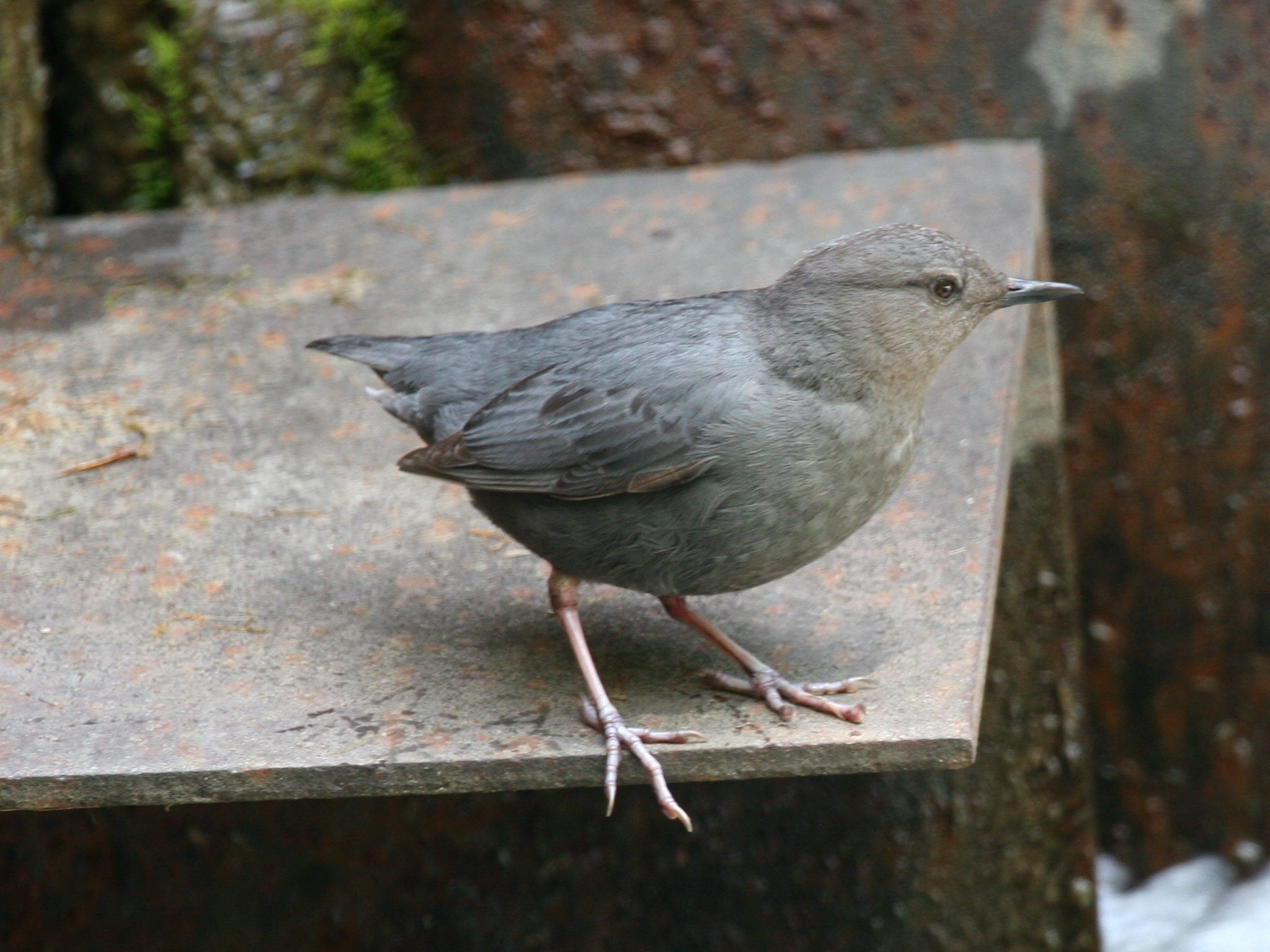
American dipper

Order: Passeriformes Family: Cinclidae

Dippers are a group of perching birds whose habitat includes aquatic environments in the Americas, Europe, and Asia. They are named for their bobbing or dipping movements. These birds have adaptations which allows them to submerge and walk on the bottom to feed on insect larvae.

- American dipper, Cinclus mexicanus LC

== Thrushes and allies ==
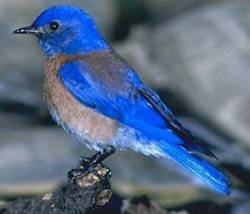
Western bluebird

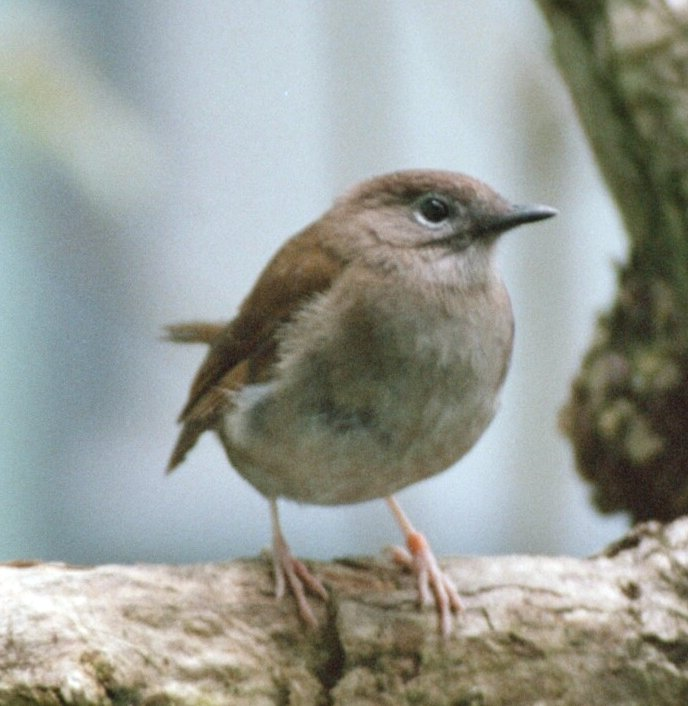
Puaiohi

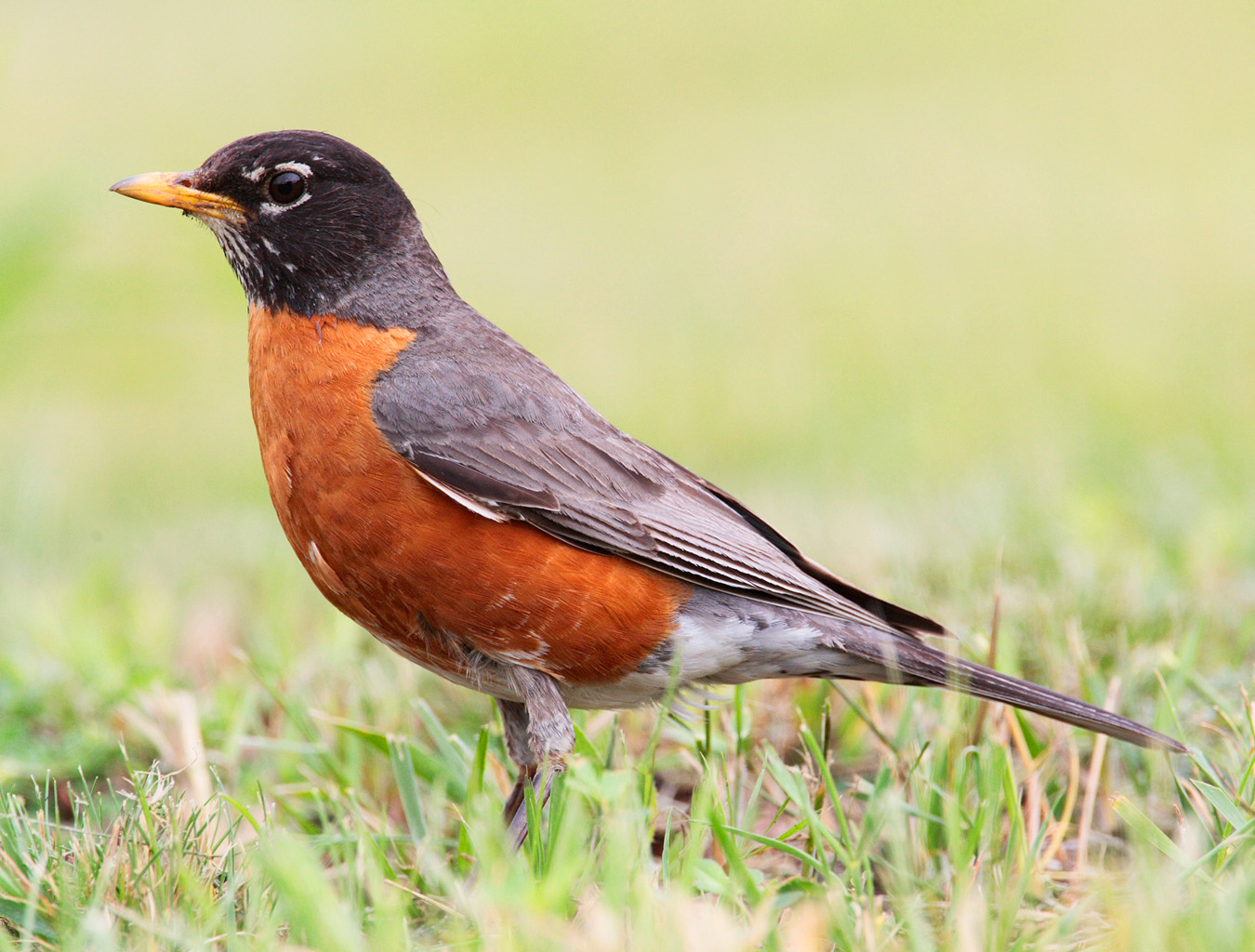
American robin

Order: Passeriformes Family: Turdidae

The thrushes are a group of passerine birds that occur mainly but not exclusively in the Old World. They are plump, soft plumaged, small to medium-sized insectivores or sometimes omnivores, often feeding on the ground. Many have attractive songs.

- Eastern bluebird, Sialia sialis LC
- Western bluebird, Sialia mexicana LC
- Mountain bluebird, Sialia currucoides LC
- Townsend's solitaire, Myadestes townsendi LC
- Brown-backed solitaire, Myadestes occidentalis (A) LC
- Kamao, Myadestes myadestinus (EH) (E) EX
- Amaui, Myadestes woahensis (EH) (E) EX
- Olomao, Myadestes lanaiensis (EH) CR
- Omao, Myadestes obscurus (EH) VU
- Puaiohi, Myadestes palmeri (EH) CR
- Orange-billed nightingale-thrush, Catharus aurantiirostris (A) LC
- Black-headed nightingale-thrush, Catharus mexicanus (A) LC
- Veery, Catharus fuscescens LC
- Gray-cheeked thrush, Catharus minimus LC
- Bicknell's thrush, Catharus bicknelli VU
- Swainson's thrush, Catharus ustulatus LC
- Hermit thrush, Catharus guttatus LC
- Wood thrush, Hylocichla mustelina LC
- Eurasian blackbird, Turdus merula (A) LC
- Eyebrowed thrush, Turdus obscurus (A) LC
- Island thrush, Turdus poliocephalus (American Samoa) LC
- Dusky thrush, Turdus eunomus (C) LC
- Naumann's thrush, Turdus naumanni (A) LC
- Fieldfare, Turdus pilaris (C) LC
- Redwing, Turdus iliacus (C) NT
- Song thrush, Turdus philomelos (A) LC
- Clay-colored thrush, Turdus grayi LC
- White-throated thrush, Turdus assimilis (C) LC
- Rufous-backed robin, Turdus rufopalliatus LC
- American robin, Turdus migratorius LC
- Western red-legged thrush, Turdus plumbeus (A) LC
- Varied thrush, Ixoreus naevius LC
- Aztec thrush, Ridgwayia pinicola (C) LC

== Old World flycatchers ==
Order: Passeriformes Family: Muscicapidae

The Old World flycatchers form a large family of small passerine birds. These are mainly small arboreal insectivores, many of which, as the name implies, take their prey on the wing.

- Gray-streaked flycatcher, Muscicapa griseisticta (C) LC
- Asian brown flycatcher, Muscicapa dauurica (A) LC
- Spotted flycatcher, Muscicapa striata (A) LC
- Dark-sided flycatcher, Muscicapa sibirica (C) LC
- White-rumped shama, Copsychus malabaricus (I) LC
- European robin, Erithacus rubecula (A) LC
- Siberian blue robin, Larvivora cyane (A) LC
- Rufous-tailed robin, Larvivora sibilans (A) LC
- Bluethroat, Cyanecula svecica LC
- Siberian rubythroat, Calliope calliope LC
- Red-flanked bluetail, Tarsiger cyanurus (C) LC
- Narcissus flycatcher, Ficedula narcissina (A) LC
- Mugimaki flycatcher, Ficedula mugimaki (A) LC
- Taiga flycatcher, Ficedula albicilla (C) LC
- Common redstart, Phoenicurus phoenicurus (A) LC
- Asian stonechat, Saxicola maurus (C) LC
- Northern wheatear, Oenanthe oenanthe LC
- Pied wheatear, Oenanthe pleschanka (A) LC

== Olive warbler ==
Order: Passeriformes Family: Peucedramidae

The olive warbler has a gray body with some olive-green on the wings and two white wing bars. The male's head and breast are orange and there is a black patch through the eye. This is the only species in its family.

- Olive warbler, Peucedramus taeniatus LC

== Weavers and allies ==
Order: Passeriformes Family: Ploceidae

Weavers are a group of small passerine birds related to the finches. These are seed-eating birds with rounded conical bills, most of which breed in sub-Saharan Africa, with fewer species in tropical Asia. Weavers get their name from the large woven nests many species make. They are gregarious birds which often breed colonially.

- Northern red bishop, Euplectes franciscanus (Puerto Rico, U.S. Virgin Islands) (I) (Note: The Northern red bishop was introduced to Puerto Rico and is accidental to rare in the U.S. Virgin Islands.) LC
- Yellow-crowned bishop, Euplectes afer (Puerto Rico) (I) LC

== Indigobirds ==
Order: Passeriformes Family: Viduidae

The Viduidae is a family of small passerine birds native to Africa that includes indigobirds and whydahs. All species are brood parasites which lay their eggs in the nests of estrildid finches. Species usually have black or indigo predominating in their plumage.

- Pin-tailed whydah, Vidua macroura (Puerto Rico) (I) LC

== Waxbills and allies ==
Order: Passeriformes Family: Estrildidae

The members of this family are small passerine birds native to the Old World tropics. They are gregarious and often colonial seed eaters with short thick but pointed bills. They are all similar in structure and habits, but have wide variation in plumage colors and patterns.

- Bronze mannikin, Spermestes cucullata (Puerto Rico, U.S. Virgin Islands) (I) LC
- African silverbill, Euodice cantans (I) LC
- Indian silverbill, Euodice malabarica (I) LC
- Java sparrow, Padda oryzivora (I) EN
- Scaly-breasted munia, Lonchura punctulata (I) LC
- Tricolored munia, Lonchura malacca (I) LC
- Chestnut munia, Lonchura atricapilla (Guam, Puerto Rico) (I) LC
- Red avadavat, Amandava amandava (I) LC
- Lavender waxbill, Glaucestrilda caerulescens (I) LC
- Common waxbill, Estrilda astrild (I) LC

== Accentors ==
Order: Passeriformes Family: Prunellidae

Accentors are small, fairly drab species superficially similar, but unrelated to, sparrows. However, accentors have thin sharp bills, reflecting their diet of insects in summer, augmented with seeds and berries in winter.

- Siberian accentor, Prunella montanella (C) LC

== Old World sparrows ==
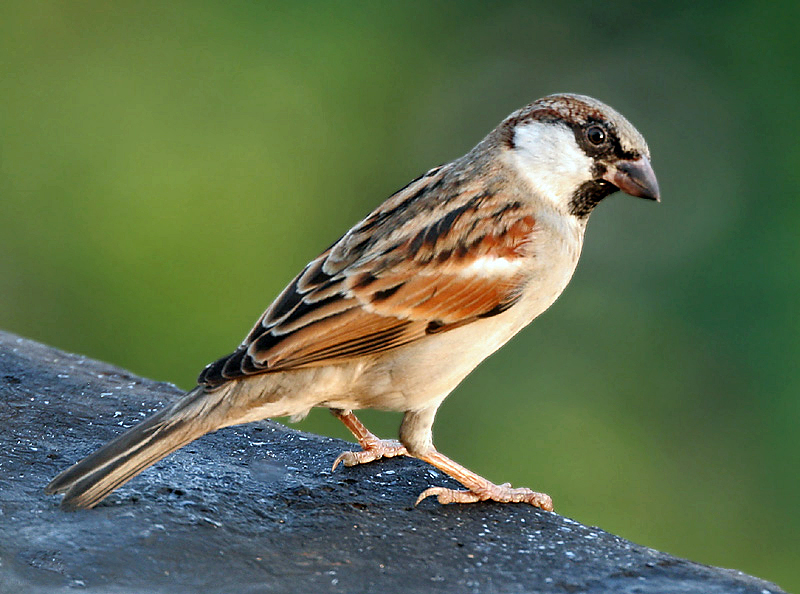
House sparrow

Order: Passeriformes Family: Passeridae

Old World sparrows are small passerine birds. In general, sparrows tend to be small plump brownish or grayish birds with short tails and short powerful beaks. Sparrows are seed eaters, but they also consume small insects.

- House sparrow, Passer domesticus (I) LC
- Eurasian tree sparrow, Passer montanus (I) LC

== Wagtails and pipits ==
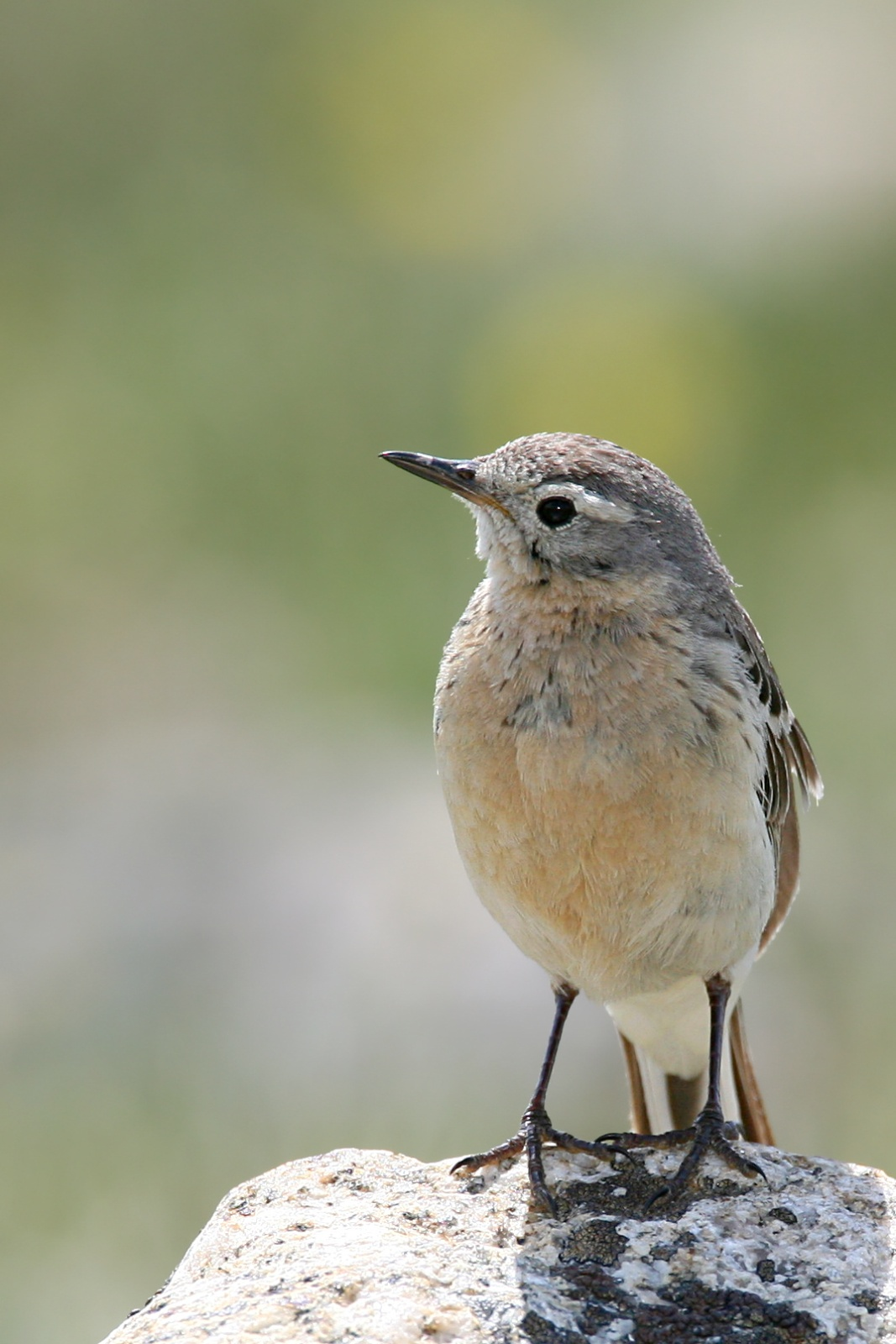
American pipit

Order: Passeriformes Family: Motacillidae

Motacillidae is a family of small passerine birds with medium to long tails. They include the wagtails, longclaws, and pipits. They are slender ground-feeding insectivores of open country.

- Western yellow wagtail, Motacilla flava (Northern Mariana Islands) (A) LC
- Eastern yellow wagtail, Motacilla tschutschensis LC
- Citrine wagtail, Motacilla citreola (A) LC
- Gray wagtail, Motacilla cinerea (C) LC
- White wagtail, Motacilla alba LC
- Tree pipit, Anthus trivialis (A) LC
- Olive-backed pipit, Anthus hodgsoni LC
- Pechora pipit, Anthus gustavi (C) LC
- Red-throated pipit, Anthus cervinus LC
- American pipit, Anthus rubescens LC
- Sprague's pipit, Anthus spragueii VU

== Finches, euphonias, and allies ==
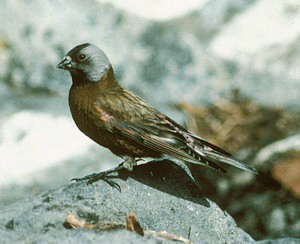
Gray-crowned rosy-finch

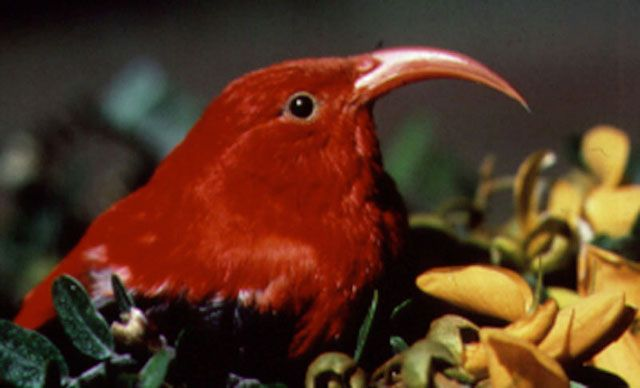
Iiwi

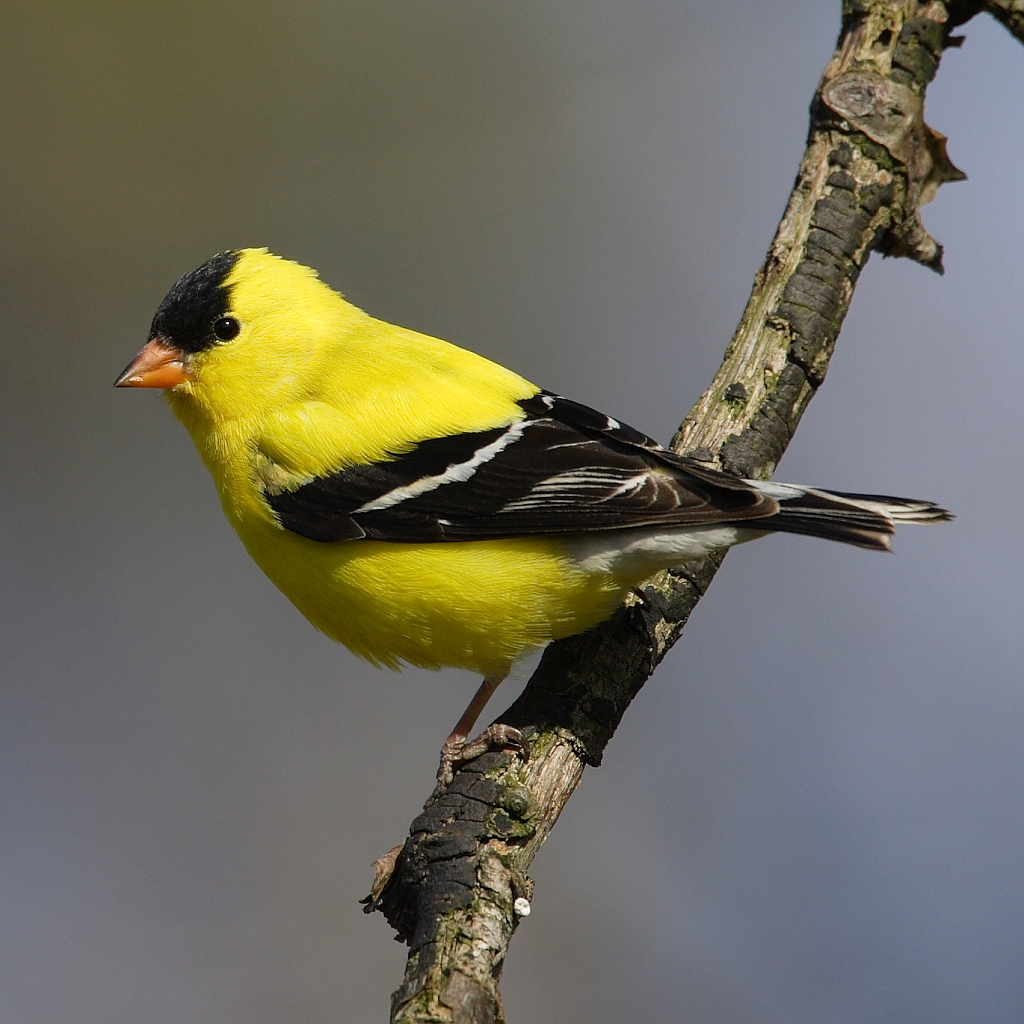
American goldfinch

Order: Passeriformes Family: Fringillidae

Finches are seed-eating passerine birds that are small to moderately large and have a strong beak, usually conical and in some species very large. All have twelve tail feathers and nine primaries. These birds have a bouncing flight with alternating bouts of flapping and gliding on closed wings, and most sing well.

- Common chaffinch, Fringilla coelebs (C) LC
- Brambling, Fringilla montifringilla LC
- Antillean euphonia, Chlorophonia musica (Puerto Rico) LC
- Evening grosbeak, Coccothraustes vespertinus VU
- Hawfinch, Coccothraustes coccothraustes (C) LC
- Common rosefinch, Carpodacus erythrinus (C) LC
- Pallas's rosefinch, Carpodacus roseus (A) LC
- Poo-uli, Melamprosops phaeosoma (EH) (E) EX
- Akikiki, Oreomystis bairdi (EH) CR
- Oahu alauahio, Paroreomyza maculata (EH) CR
- Kakawahie, Paroreomyza flammea (EH) (E) EX
- Maui alauahio, Paroreomyza montana (EH) EN
- Palila, Loxiodes balleui (EH) CR
- Laysan finch, Telespiza cantans (EH) VU
- Nihoa finch, Telespiza ultima (EH) CR
- Kona grosbeak, Chloridops kona (EH) (E) EX
- Lesser koa-finch, Rhodacanthis flaviceps (EH) (E) EX
- Greater koa-finch, Rhodacanthis palmeri (EH) (E) EX
- Ula-ai-hawane, Ciridops anna (EH) (E) EX
- Akohekohe, Palmeria dolei (EH) CR
- Laysan honeycreeper, Himatione fraithii (EH) (E) EX
- Apapane, Himatione sanguinea (EH) LC
- Iiwi, Drepanis coccinea (EH) VU
- Hawaii mamo, Drepanis pacifica (EH) (E) EX
- Black mamo, Drepanis funerea (EH) (E) EX
- Ou, Psittirostra psittacea (EH) CR
- Lanai hookbill, Dysmorodropanis munroi (EH) (E) EX
- Maui parrotbill, Pseudonestor xanthrophrys (EH) CR
- Kauai nukupuu, Hemignathus hanapepe (EH) (E) EX
- Oahu nukupuu, Hemignathus lucidus (EH) (E) EX
- Maui nukupuu, Hemignathus affinis (EH) (E) EX
- Akiapolaau, Hemignathus wilsoni (EH) EN
- Lesser akialoa, Akialoa obscura (EH) (E) EX
- Kauai akialoa, Akialoa stejnegeri (EH) (E) EX
- Oahu akialoa, Akialoa ellisiana (EH) (E) EX
- Maui-nui akialoa, Akialoa lanaiensis (EH) (E) EX
- Anianiau, Magumma parva (EH) VU
- Hawaii amakihi, Chlorodrepanis virens (EH) LC
- Oahu amakihi, Chlorodrepanis flavus (EH) VU
- Kauai amakihi, Chlorodrepanis stejnegeri (EH) VU
- Greater amakihi, Viridonia sagittirostris (EH) (E) EX
- Hawaii creeper, Loxops mana (EH) EN
- Akekee, Loxops caeruleirostris (EH) CR
- Oahu akepa, Loxops wolstenholmei (EH) (E) EX
- Maui akepa, Loxops ochraceus (EH) (E) EX
- Hawaii akepa, Loxops coccineus (EH) EN
- Pine grosbeak, Pinicola enucleator LC
- Eurasian bullfinch, Pyrrhula pyrrhula (C) LC
- Asian rosy-finch, Leucosticte arctoa (A) LC
- Gray-crowned rosy finch, Leucosticte tephrocotis LC
- Black rosy-finch, Leucosticte atrata (EM) EN
- Brown-capped rosy-finch, Leucosticte australis (EM) EN
- House finch, Haemorhous mexicanus (Note: The house finch is native to the southwestern U.S. and was introduced in the east.) LC
- Purple finch, Haemorhous purpureus LC
- Cassin's finch, Haemorhous cassinii LC'
- Oriental greenfinch, Chloris sinica (C) LC
- Yellow-fronted canary, Crithagra mozambica (I) LC
- Common redpoll, Acanthis flammea LC
- Hoary redpoll, Acanthis hornemanni (Not yet assessed by the IUCN)
- Red crossbill, Loxia curvirostra LC
- Cassia crossbill, Loxia sinesciuris (Not yet assessed by the IUCN)
- White-winged crossbill, Loxia leucoptera LC
- Eurasian siskin, Spinus spinus (A) LC
- Pine siskin, Spinus pinus LC
- Lesser goldfinch, Spinus psaltria LC
- Lawrence's goldfinch, Spinus lawrencei LC
- American goldfinch, Spinus tristis LC
- Island canary, Serinus canaria (I) LC
- Red siskin, Spinus cucullata (Puerto Rico) (I) EN

== Longspurs and snow buntings ==
Order: Passeriformes Family: Calcariidae

The Calcariidae are a group of passerine birds that had been traditionally grouped with the New World sparrows, but differ in a number of respects and are usually found in open grassy areas.

- Lapland longspur, Calcarius lapponicus LC
- Chestnut-collared longspur, Calcarius ornatus VU
- Smith's longspur, Calcarius pictus LC
- Thick-billed longspur, Rhynchophanes mccownii LC
- Snow bunting, Plectrophenax nivalis LC
- McKay's bunting, Plectrophenax hyperboreus (EM) LC

== Old World buntings ==
Order: Passeriformes Family: Emberizidae

Emberizidae is a family of passerine birds containing a single genus. Until 2017, the New World sparrows (Passerellidae) were also considered part of this family.

- Pine bunting, Emberiza leucocephalos (A) LC
- Yellow-browed bunting, Emberiza chrysophrys (A) LC
- Little bunting, Emberiza pusilla (C) LC
- Rustic bunting, Emberiza rustica (A) VU
- Yellow-throated bunting, Emberiza elegans (A) LC
- Yellow-breasted bunting, Emberiza aureola (A) CR
- Gray bunting, Emberiza variabilis (A) LC
- Pallas's bunting, Emberiza pallasi (A) LC
- Reed bunting, Emberiza schoeniclus (C) LC

== New World sparrows ==
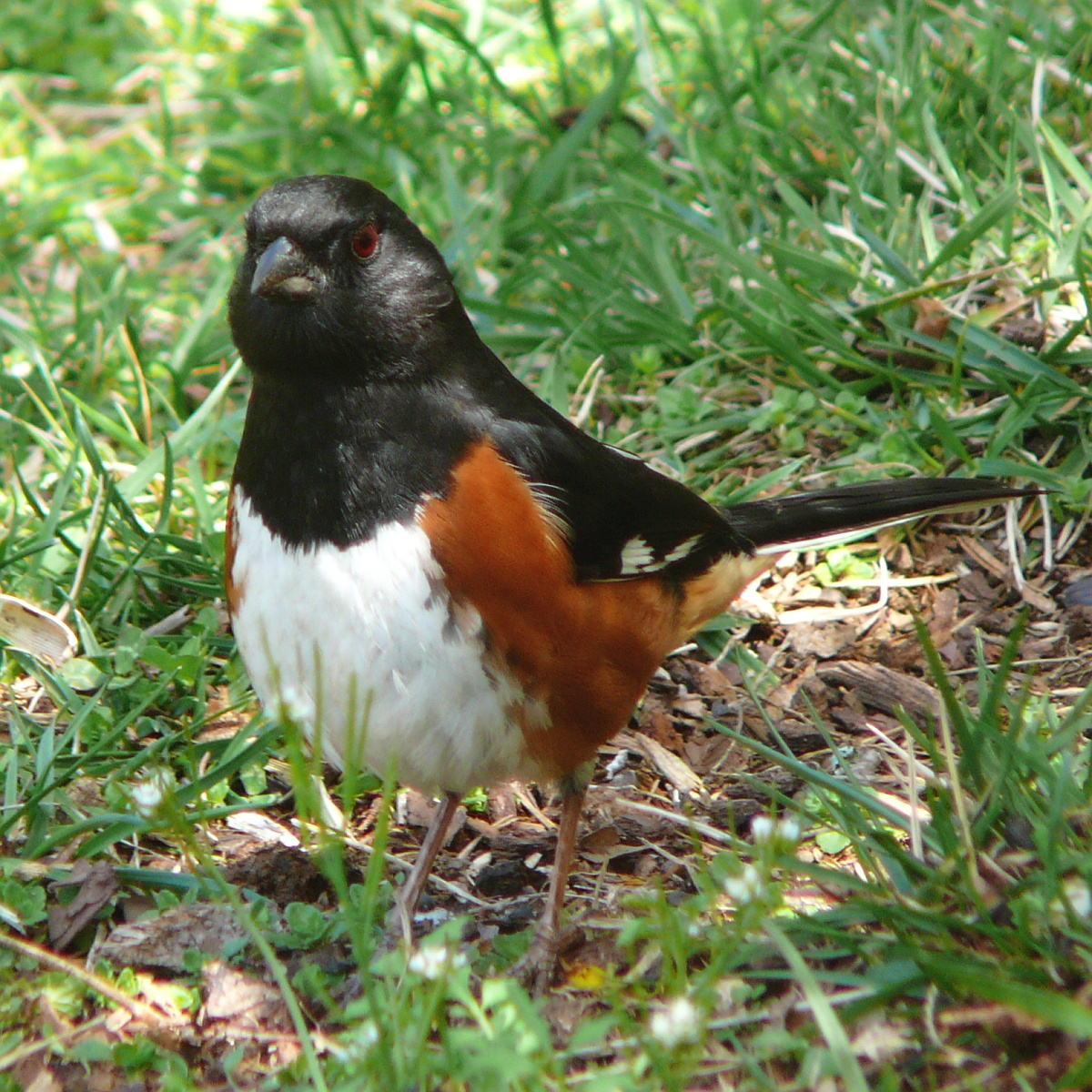
Eastern towhee

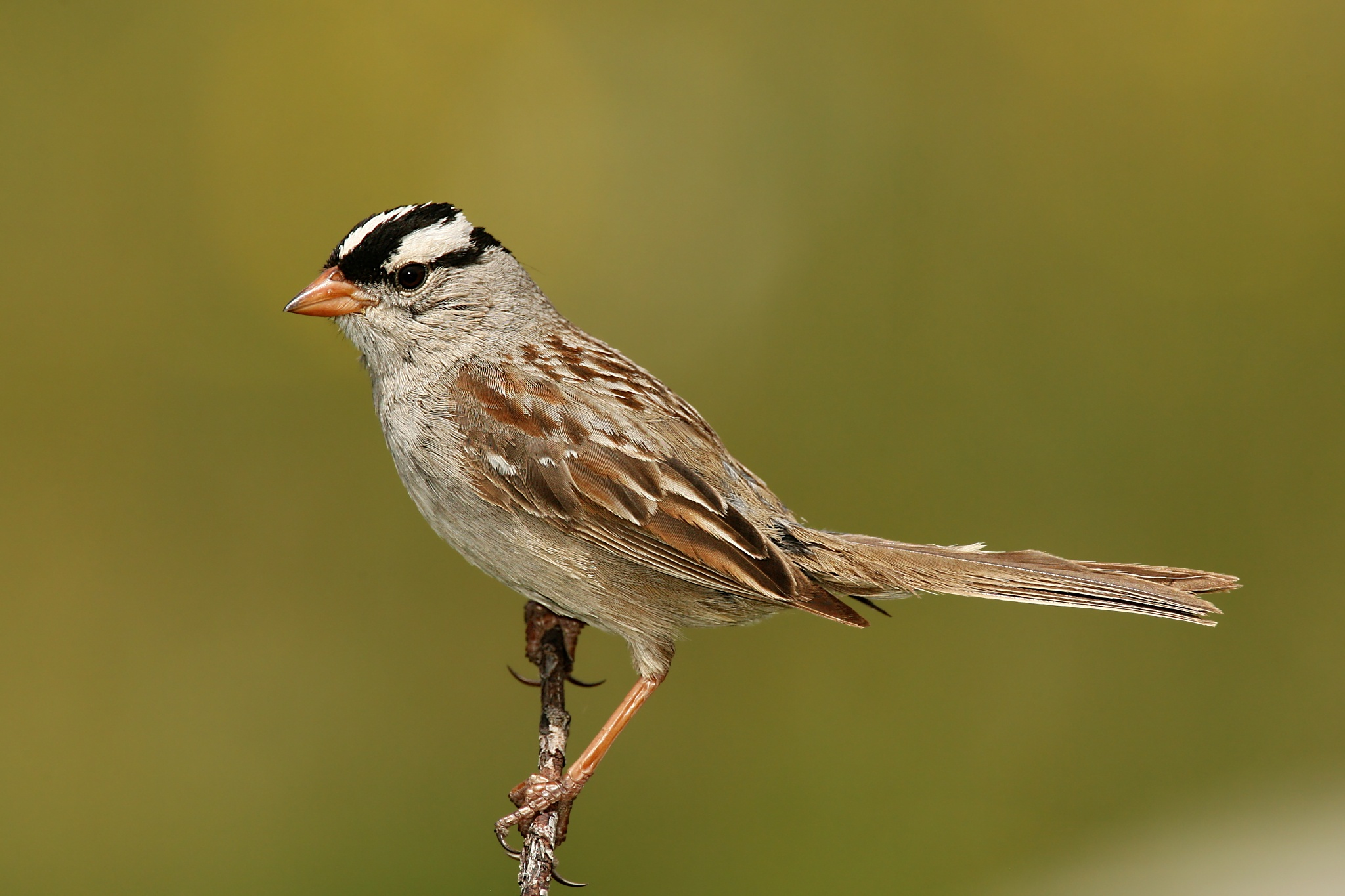
White-crowned sparrow

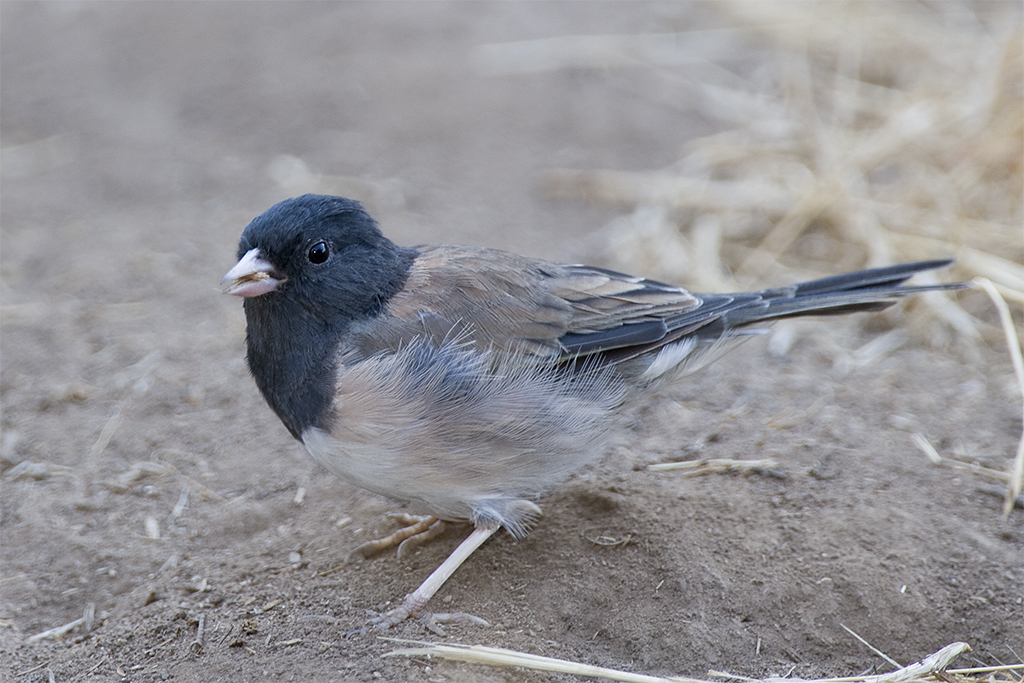
Dark-eyed junco

Order: Passeriformes Family: Passerellidae

Until 2017, these species were considered part of the family Emberizidae. Most of the species are known as sparrows, but these birds are not closely related to the Old World sparrows which are in the family Passeridae. Many of these have distinctive head patterns.

- Rufous-winged sparrow, Peucaea carpalis LC
- Botteri's sparrow, Peucaea botterii LC
- Cassin's sparrow, Peucaea cassinii LC
- Bachman's sparrow, Peucaea aestivalis (EM) NT
- Grasshopper sparrow, Ammodramus savannarum LC
- Olive sparrow, Arremonops rufivirgatus LC
- Five-striped sparrow, Amphispizopsis quinquestriata LC
- Black-throated sparrow, Amphispiza bilineata LC
- Lark sparrow, Chondestes grammacus LC
- Lark bunting, Calamospiza melanocorys LC
- Chipping sparrow, Spizella passerina LC
- Clay-colored sparrow, Spizella pallida LC
- Black-chinned sparrow, Spizella atrogularis LC
- Field sparrow, Spizella pusilla LC
- Brewer's sparrow, Spizella breweri LC
- Worthen's sparrow, Spizella wortheni (A) EN
- Fox sparrow, Passerella iliaca LC
- American tree sparrow, Spizelloides arborea LC
- Dark-eyed junco, Junco hyemalis LC
- Yellow-eyed junco, Junco phaeonotus LC
- White-crowned sparrow, Zonotrichia leucophrys LC
- Golden-crowned sparrow, Zonotrichia atricapilla LC
- Harris's sparrow, Zonotrichia querula NT
- White-throated sparrow, Zonotrichia albicollis LC
- Sagebrush sparrow, Artemisiospiza nevadensis LC
- Bell's sparrow, Artemisiospiza belli LC
- Vesper sparrow, Pooecetes gramineus LC
- LeConte's sparrow, Ammospiza leconteii LC
- Seaside sparrow, Ammospiza maritima (EM) LC
- Nelson's sparrow, Ammospiza nelsoni LC
- Saltmarsh sparrow, Ammospiza caudacuta (EM) EN
- Baird's sparrow, Centronyx bairdii LC
- Henslow's sparrow, Centronyx henslowii LC
- Savannah sparrow, Passerculus sandwichensis LC
- Song sparrow, Melospiza melodia LC
- Lincoln's sparrow, Melospiza lincolnii LC
- Swamp sparrow, Melospiza georgiana LC
- Canyon towhee, Melozone fuscus LC
- Abert's towhee, Melozone aberti LC
- California towhee, Melozone crissalis LC
- Rufous-crowned sparrow, Aimophila ruficeps LC
- Green-tailed towhee, Pipilo chlorurus LC
- Spotted towhee, Pipilo maculatus LC
- Eastern towhee, Pipilo erythrophthalmus LC

== Puerto Rican tanager ==
Order: Passeriformes Family: Nesospingidae

This species was formerly classified as a tanager (family Thraupidae) but was placed in its own family in 2017.

- Puerto Rican tanager, Nesospingus speculiferus (Puerto Rico) (EP) LC

== Spindalises ==
Order: Passeriformes Family: Spindalidae

The members of this small family are native to the Greater Antilles. One species occurs fairly frequently in Florida.

- Western spindalis, Spindalis zena LC
- Puerto Rican spindalis, Spindalis portoricensis (Puerto Rico) (EP) LC

== Yellow-breasted chat ==
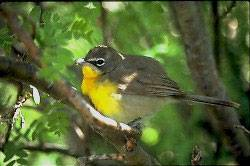
Yellow-breasted chat — whose breeding range is almost entirely within the contiguous United States.

Order: Passeriformes Family: Icteriidae

This species was historically placed in the wood-warblers (Parulidae) but nonetheless most authorities were unsure if it belonged there. It was placed in its own family in 2017.

- Yellow-breasted chat, Icteria virens LC

== Troupials and allies ==
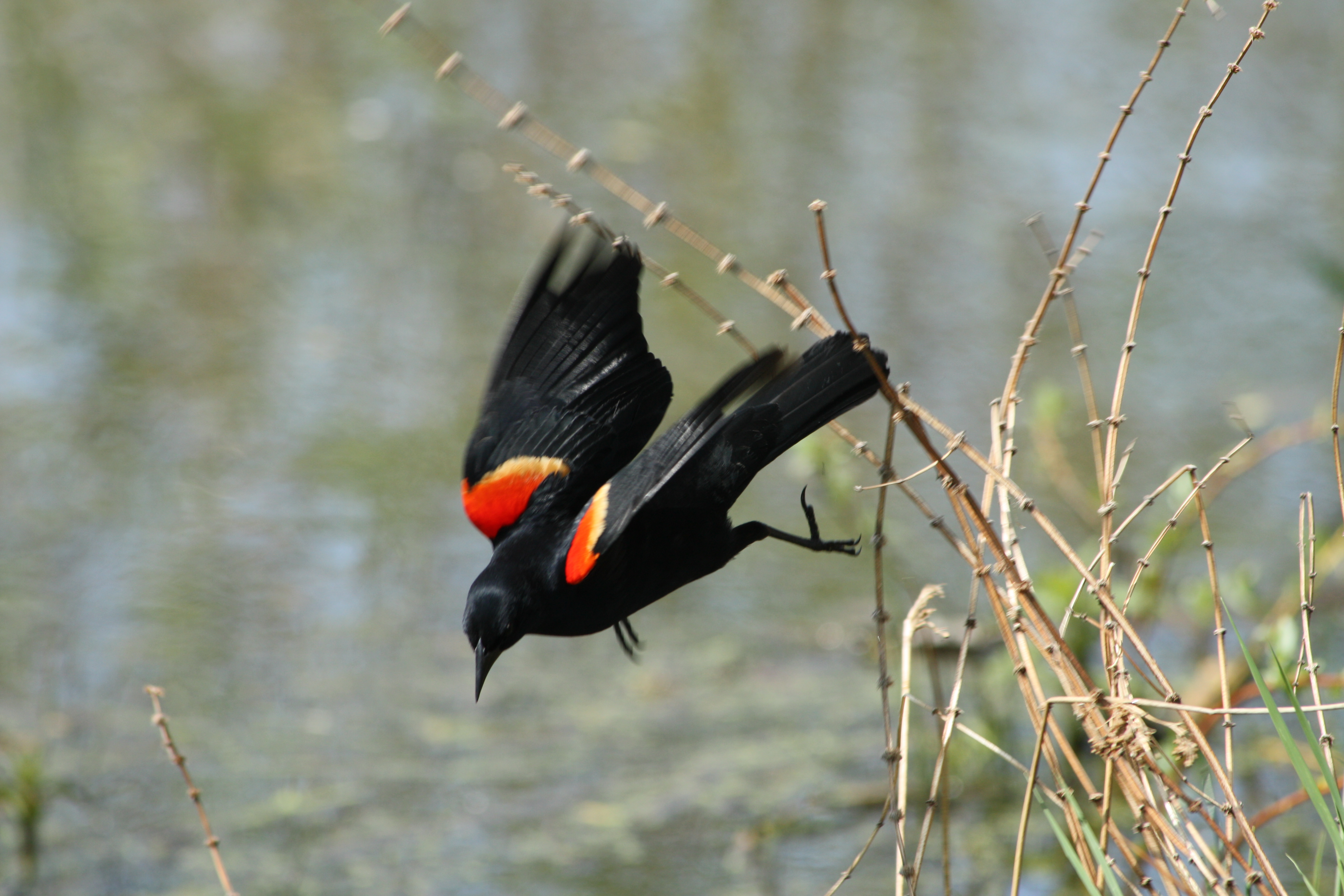
Red-winged blackbird

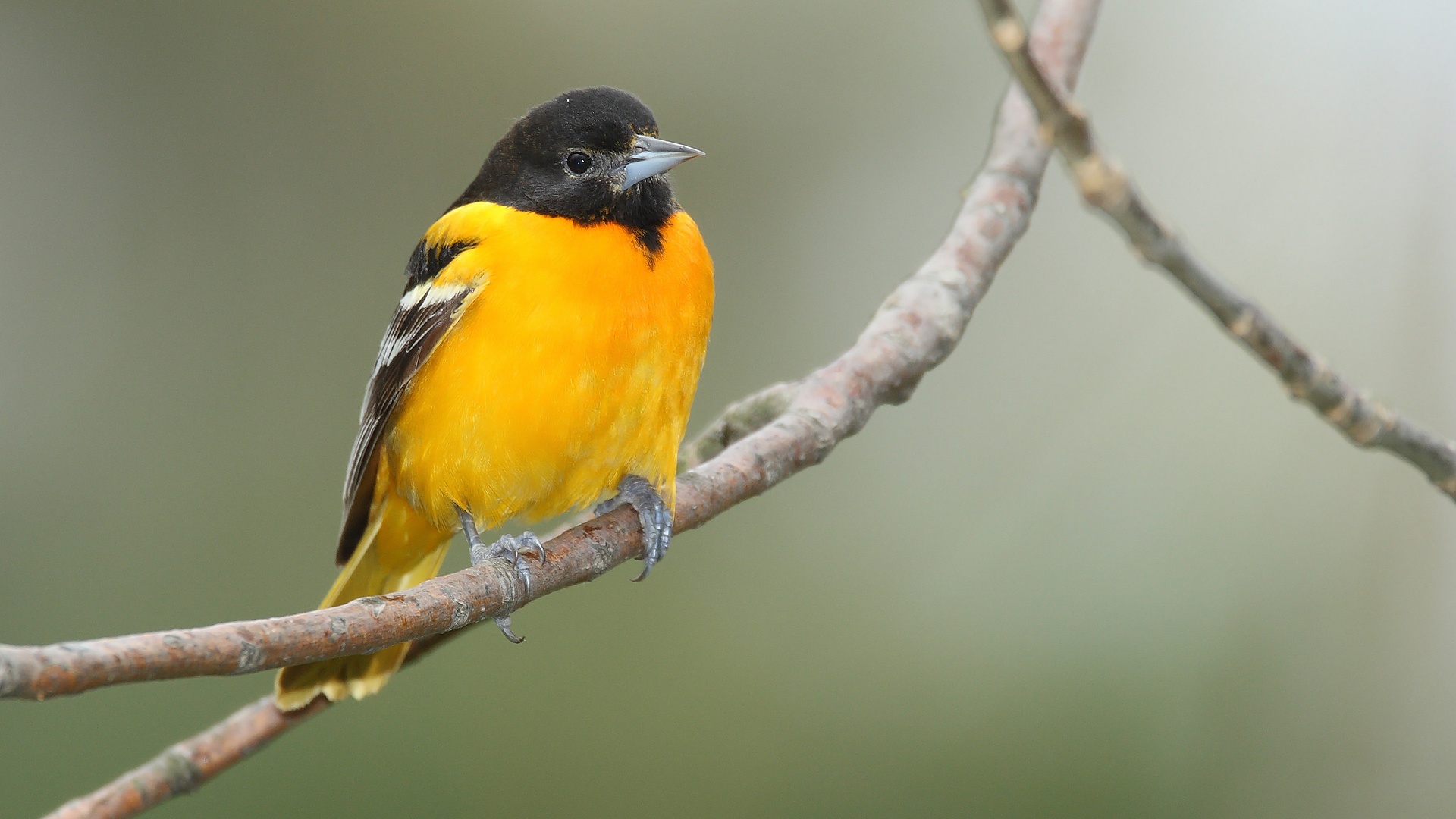
Baltimore oriole

Order: Passeriformes Family: Icteridae

The icterids are a group of small to medium-sized, often colorful passerine birds restricted to the New World and include the grackles, New World blackbirds, and New World orioles. Most species have black as a predominant plumage color which is often enlivened by yellow, orange, or red.

- Yellow-headed blackbird, Xanthocephalus xanthocephalus LC
- Bobolink, Dolichonyx oryzivorus LC
- Chihuahuan meadowlark, Sturnella lilianae
- Eastern meadowlark, Sturnella magna NT
- Western meadowlark, Sturnella neglecta LC
- Puerto Rican oriole, Icterus portonicensis (Puerto Rico) (EP) LC
- Black-vented oriole, Icterus wagleri (A) LC
- Orchard oriole, Icterus spurius LC
- Hooded oriole, Icterus cucullatus LC
- Venezuelan troupial, Icterus icterus (I) (Puerto Rico, U.S. Virgin Islands) (I) (Note: The Venezuelan troupial was introduced in Puerto Rico and is accidental to rare in the U.S. Virgin Islands.) LC
- Streak-backed oriole, Icterus pustulatus (C) LC
- Bullock's oriole, Icterus bullockii LC
- Spot-breasted oriole, Icterus pectoralis (I) LC
- Altamira oriole, Icterus gularis LC
- Audubon's oriole, Icterus graduacauda LC
- Baltimore oriole, Icterus galbula LC
- Black-backed oriole, Icterus abeillei (A) LC
- Scott's oriole, Icterus parisorum LC
- Red-winged blackbird, Agelaius phoeniceus LC
- Tricolored blackbird, Agelaius tricolor EN
- Tawny-shouldered blackbird, Agelaius humeralis (A) LC
- Yellow-shouldered blackbird, Agelaius xanthomus (Puerto Rico) (EP) EN
- Shiny cowbird, Molothrus bonariensis LC
- Bronzed cowbird, Molothrus aeneus LC
- Brown-headed cowbird, Molothrus ater LC
- Rusty blackbird, Euphagus carolinus VU
- Brewer's blackbird, Euphagus cyanocephalus LC
- Common grackle, Quiscalus quiscula NT
- Boat-tailed grackle, Quiscalus major (EM) LC
- Great-tailed grackle, Quiscalus mexicanus (A) LC
- Greater Antillean grackle, Quiscalus niger (Puerto Rico, U.S. Virgin Islands) LC

== New World warblers ==
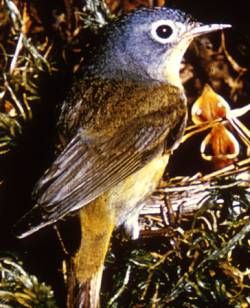
Nashville warbler

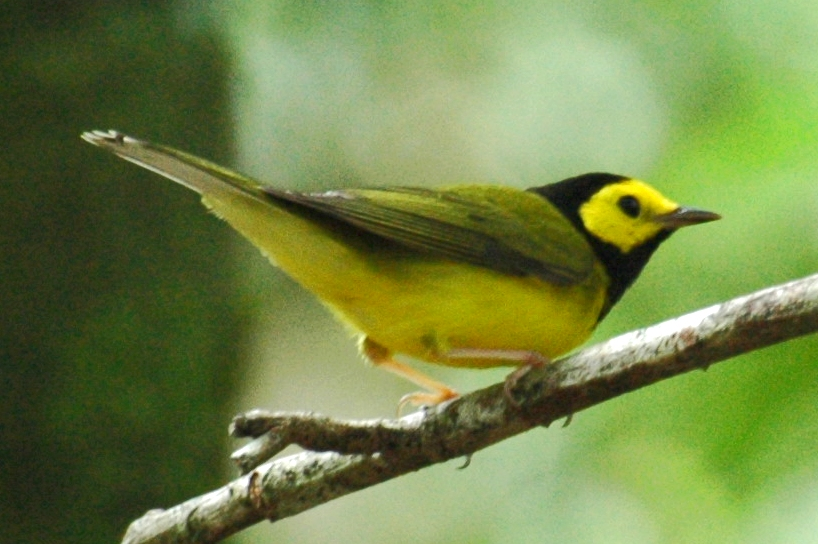
Hooded warbler

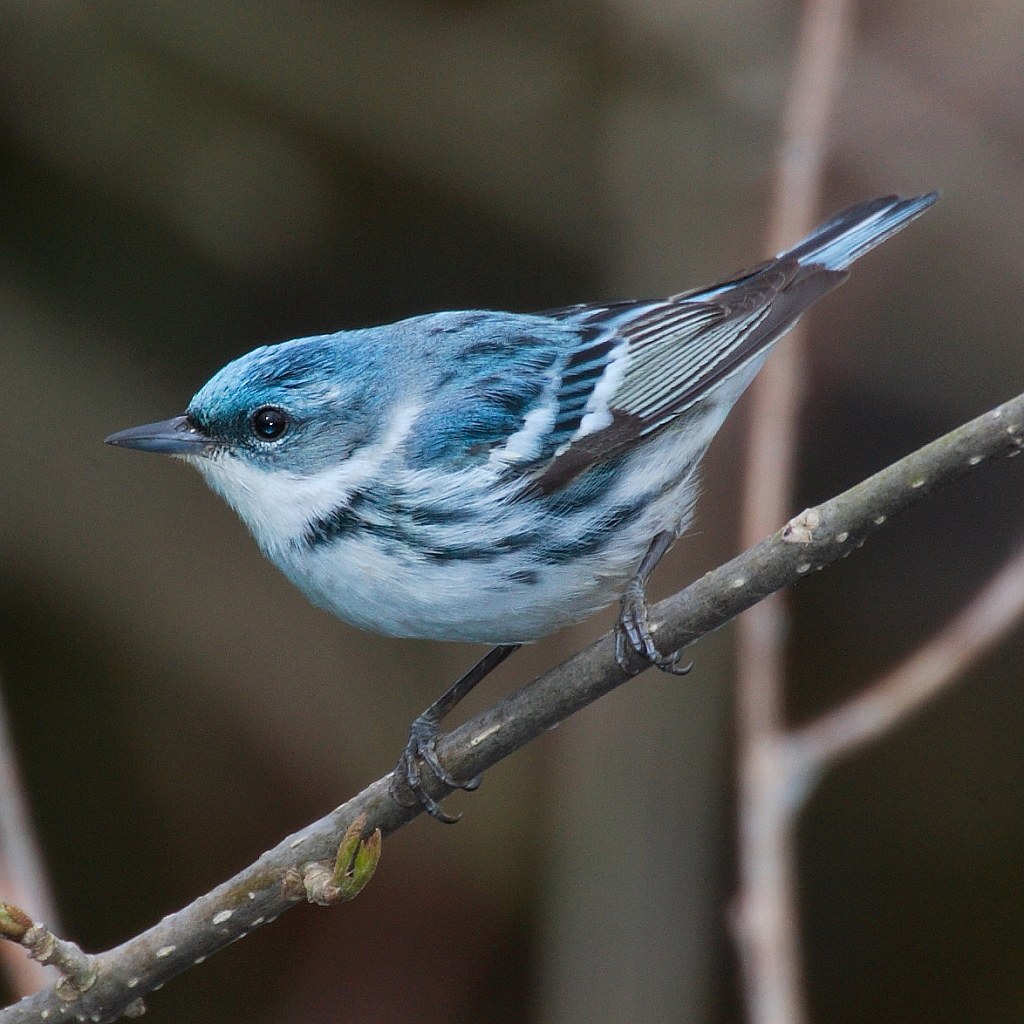
Cerulean warbler

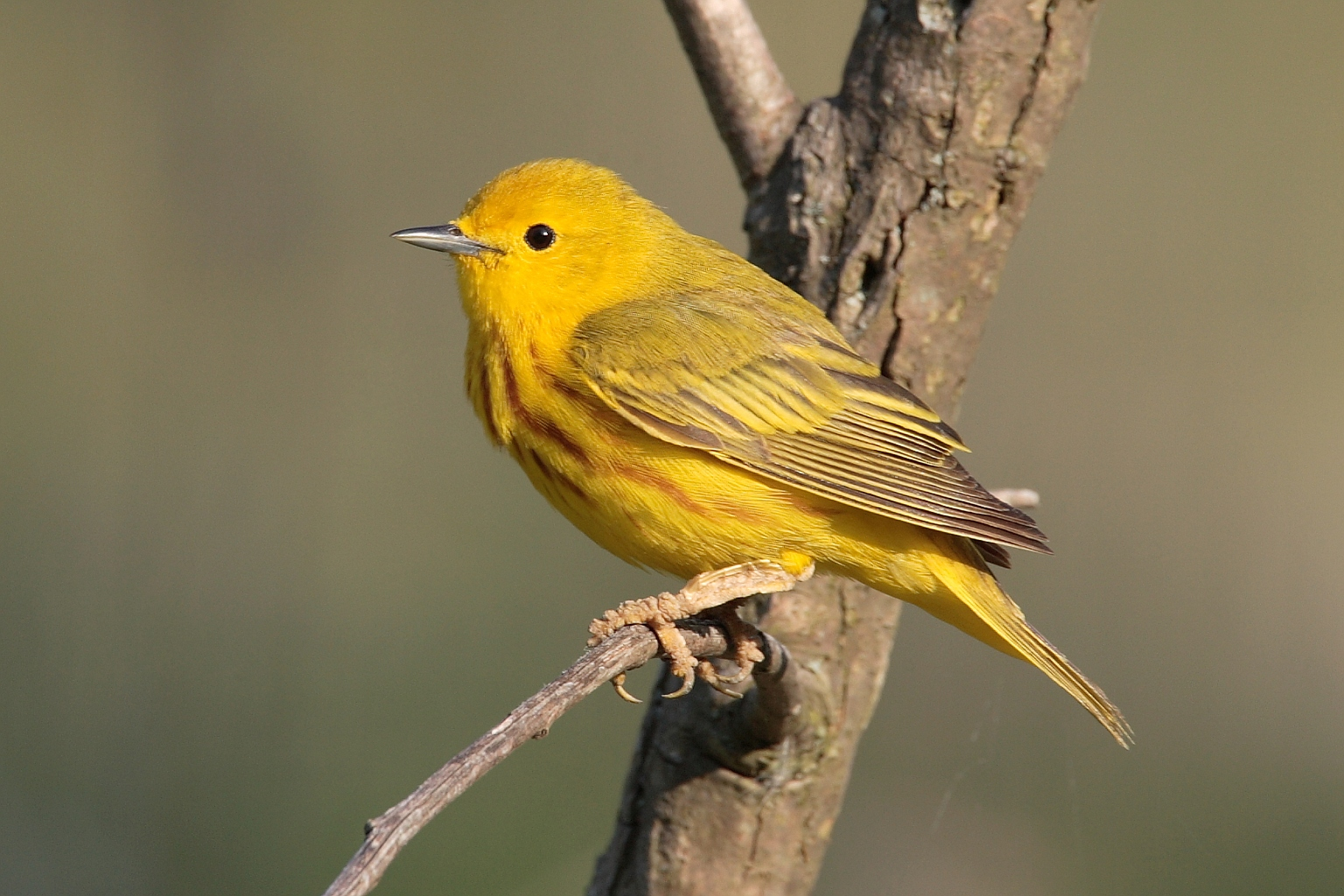
Yellow warbler

Order: Passeriformes Family: Parulidae

The wood-warblers are a group of small often colorful passerine birds restricted to the New World. Most are arboreal, but some are more terrestrial. Most members of this family are insectivores.

- Ovenbird, Seiurus aurocapilla LC
- Worm-eating warbler, Helmitheros vermivorum LC
- Louisiana waterthrush, Parkesia motacilla LC
- Northern waterthrush, Parkesia noveboracensis LC
- Bachman's warbler, Vermivora bachmanii CR
- Golden-winged warbler, Vermivora chrysoptera NT
- Blue-winged warbler, Vermivora cyanoptera LC
- Black-and-white warbler, Mniotilta varia LC
- Prothonotary warbler, Protonotaria citrea LC
- Swainson's warbler, Limnothlypis swainsonii LC
- Crescent-chested warbler, Oreothlypis superciliosa (C) LC
- Tennessee warbler, Leiothlypis peregrina LC
- Orange-crowned warbler, Leiothlypis celata LC
- Colima warbler, Leiothlypis crissalis LC
- Lucy's warbler, Leiothlypis luciae LC
- Nashville warbler, Leiothlypis ruficapilla LC
- Virginia's warbler, Leiothlypis virginiae LC
- Connecticut warbler, Oporornis agilis LC
- Gray-crowned yellowthroat, Geothlypis poliocephala (C) LC
- MacGillivray's warbler, Geothlypis tolmiei LC
- Mourning warbler, Geothlypis philadelphia LC
- Kentucky warbler, Geothlypis formosa LC
- Common yellowthroat, Geothlypis trichas LC
- Elfin-woods warbler, Setophaga angelae (Puerto Rico) (EP) EN
- Hooded warbler, Setophaga citrina LC
- American redstart, Setophaga ruticilla LC
- Kirtland's warbler, Setophaga kirtlandii NT
- Cape May warbler, Setophaga tigrina LC
- Cerulean warbler, Setophaga cerulea NT
- Northern parula, Setophaga americana LC
- Tropical parula, Setophaga pitiayumi LC
- Magnolia warbler, Setophaga magnolia LC
- Bay-breasted warbler, Setophaga castanea LC
- Blackburnian warbler, Setophaga fusca LC
- Yellow warbler, Setophaga aestiva LC
- Chestnut-sided warbler, Setophaga pensylvanica LC
- Blackpoll warbler, Setophaga striata NT
- Black-throated blue warbler, Setophaga caerulescens LC
- Palm warbler, Setophaga palmarum LC
- Pine warbler, Setophaga pinus LC
- Yellow-rumped warbler, Setophaga coronata LC
- Yellow-throated warbler, Setophaga dominica LC
- Prairie warbler, Setophaga discolor LC
- Adelaide's warbler, Setophaga adelaidae (Puerto Rico, U.S. Virgin Islands) (EP) LC
- Grace's warbler, Setophaga graciae LC
- Black-throated grey warbler, Setophaga nigrescens LC
- Townsend's warbler, Setophaga townsendi LC
- Hermit warbler, Setophaga occidentalis LC
- Golden-cheeked warbler, Setophaga chrysoparia EN
- Black-throated green warbler, Setophaga virens LC
- Fan-tailed warbler, Basileuterus lachrymosus (C) LC
- Rufous-capped warbler, Basileuterus rufifrons LC
- Golden-crowned warbler, Basileuterus culicivorus (C) LC
- Canada warbler, Cardellina canadensis LC
- Wilson's warbler, Cardellina pusilla LC
- Red-faced warbler, Cardellina rubrifrons LC
- Painted redstart, Myioborus pictus LC
- Slate-throated redstart, Myioborus miniatus (C) LC

== Cardinals and allies ==
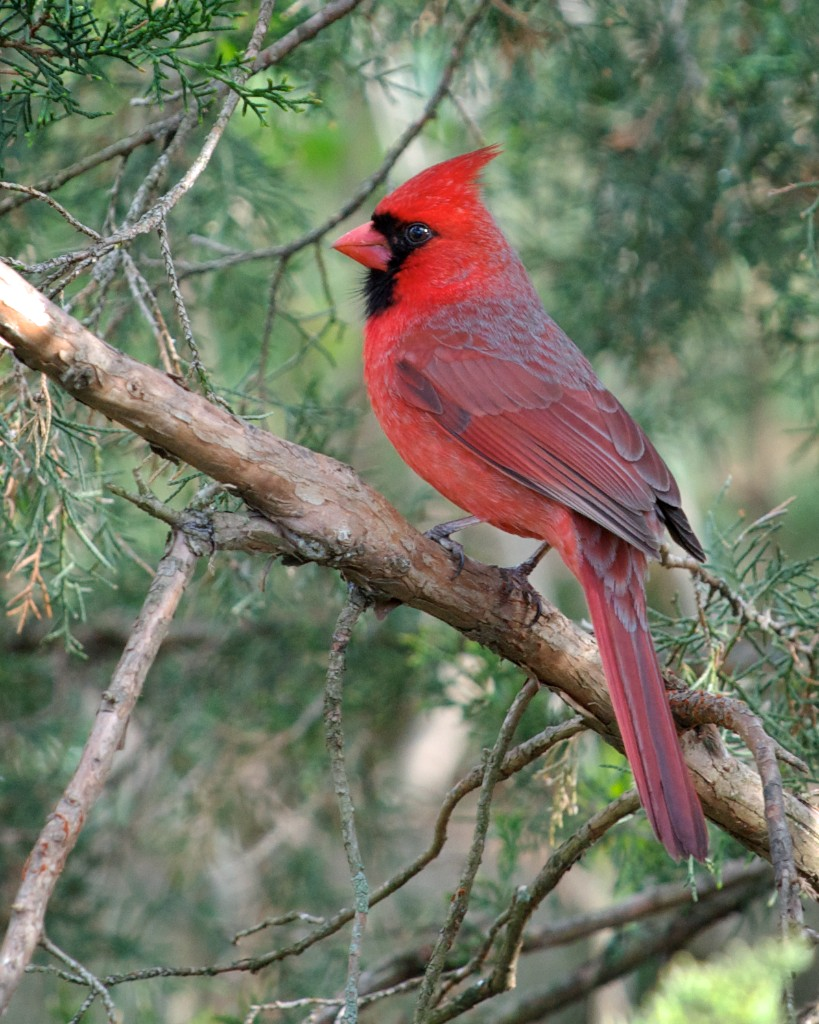
Northern cardinal

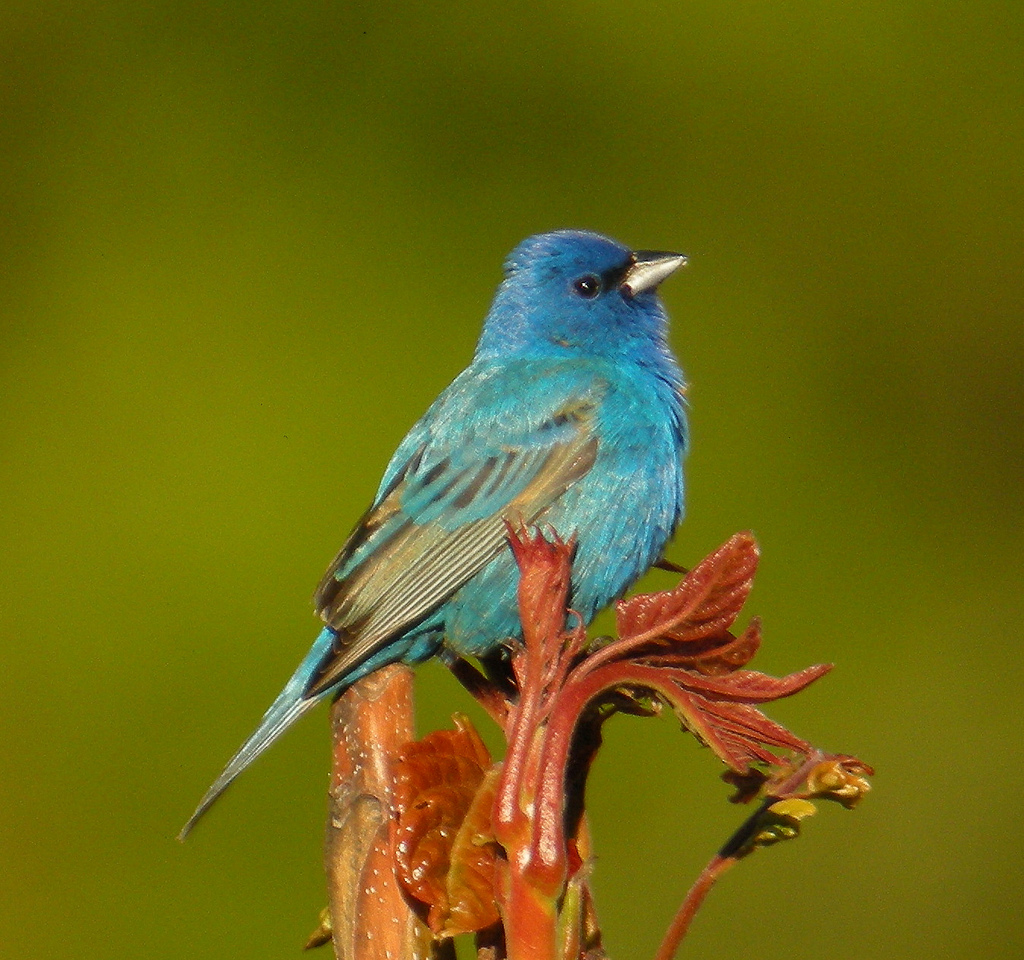
Indigo bunting

Order: Passeriformes Family: Cardinalidae

The cardinals are a family of robust seed-eating birds with strong bills. They are typically associated with open woodland. The sexes usually have distinct plumages.

- Hepatic tanager, Piranga flava LC
- Summer tanager, Piranga rubra LC
- Scarlet tanager, Piranga olivacea LC
- Western tanager, Piranga ludoviciana LC
- Flame-colored tanager, Piranga bidentata LC
- Crimson-collared grosbeak, Rhodothraupis celaeno (C) LC
- Northern cardinal, Cardinalis cardinalis LC
- Pyrrhuloxia, Cardinalis sinuatus LC
- Yellow grosbeak, Pheucticus chrysopeplus (C) LC
- Rose-breasted grosbeak, Pheucticus ludovicianus LC
- Black-headed grosbeak, Pheucticus melanocephalus LC
- Blue bunting, Cyanocompsa parellina (C) LC
- Blue grosbeak, Passerina caerulea LC
- Lazuli bunting, Passerina amoena LC
- Indigo bunting, Passerina cyanea LC
- Varied bunting, Passerina versicolor LC
- Painted bunting, Passerina ciris LC
- Dickcissel, Spiza americana LC

== Tanagers and allies ==
Order: Passeriformes Family: Thraupidae

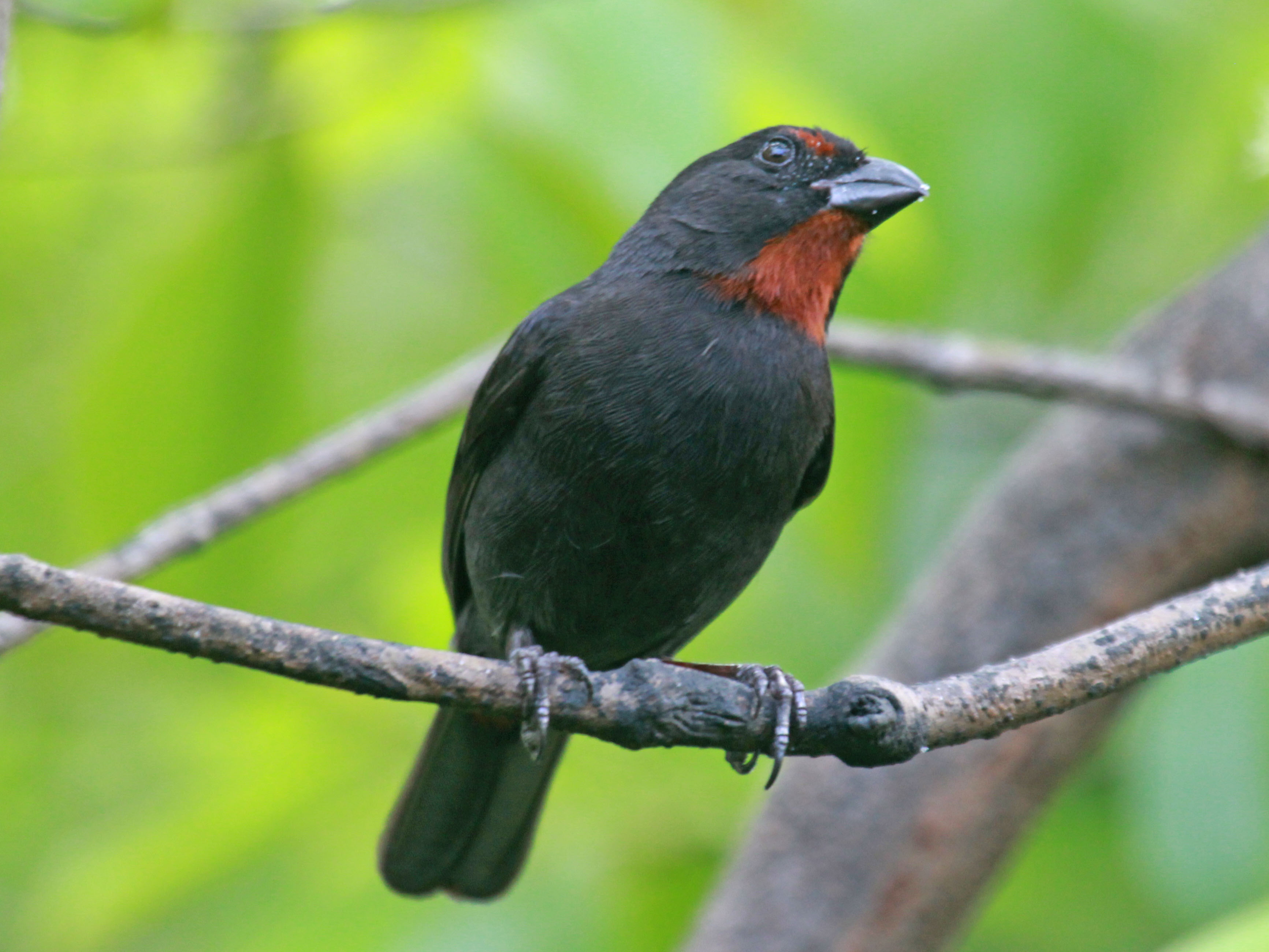
Lesser Antillean bullfinch

The tanagers are a large group of small to medium-sized passerine birds restricted to the New World, mainly in the tropics. Many species are brightly colored. As a family they are omnivorous, but individual species specialize in eating fruits, seeds, insects, or other types of food.

- Red-crested cardinal, Paroaria coronata (I) LC
- Yellow-billed cardinal, Paroaria capitata (I) LC
- Saffron finch, Sicalis flaveola (I) LC
- Red-legged honeycreeper, Cyanerpes cyaneus (A) LC
- Bananaquit, Coereba flaveola (C) LC
- Yellow-faced grassquit, Tiaris olivaceus (C) LC
- Puerto Rican bullfinch, Melopyrrha portoricensis (Puerto Rico) (EP) LC
- Lesser Antillean bullfinch, Loxigilla noctis (U.S. Virgin Islands) LC
- Black-faced grassquit, Melanospiza bicolor (C) LC
- Morelet's seedeater, Sporophila morelleti LC

== See also ==
- List of birds
- Lists of birds by region
- List of endemic birds of Hawaii
- Fauna of the United States
