= List of birds of Hawaii =

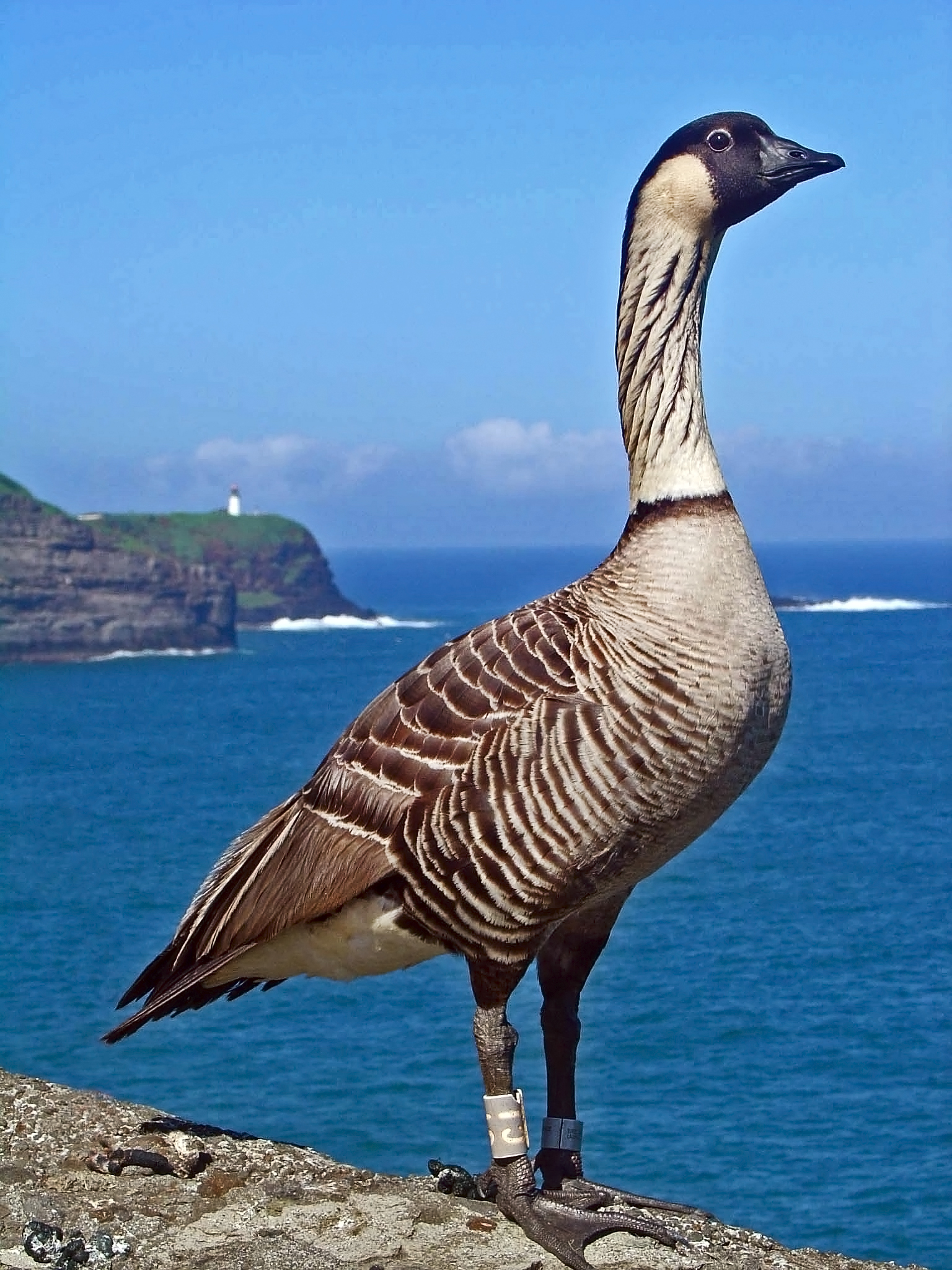
The nene is the official state bird of Hawaii.

This list of birds of Hawaii is a comprehensive listing of all the bird species seen naturally in the U.S. state of Hawaii as determined by Robert L. and Peter Pyle of the Bishop Museum, Honolulu, and modified by subsequent taxonomic changes.

The scope of this list encompasses the entire Hawaiian Islands chain, from Kure Atoll in the Northwestern Hawaiian Islands to the north, to the "Big Island" of Hawaii to the south. The list contains 337 species. Of them, 64 are or were endemic to the islands, 130 are vagrants and 52 were introduced by humans. Thirty-three of the 64 endemic species are extinct and two formerly established introduced species were extirpated. The list does not include introduced species that have not become established. An additional vagrant species has been added from another source.

This list is presented in the taxonomic sequence of the Check-list of North and Middle American Birds, 7th edition through the 63rd Supplement, published by the American Ornithological Society (AOS). Common and scientific names are also those of the Check-list, except that native Hawaiian spelling is used where appropriate and the common names of families are from the Clements taxonomy because the AOS list does not include them.

The following codes define the distribution and relative abundance of species on this list:

- (En) Endemic - a species either entirely confined to the Hawaiian Islands in its natural distribution, or a species whose breeding range is entirely confined to the Hawaiian Islands
- (V) Vagrant - a visitor that does not occur regularly
- (Xt) Extinct - "extinct or almost certainly extinct" per Pyle and Pyle
- (xd) Extirpated - a species that no longer occurs in Hawaii, but other populations still exist elsewhere
- (I) Introduced - established solely as result of human intervention with "a viable breeding population for at least 15 years" per Pyle and Pyle

Population status symbols are those of the Red List published by the International Union for Conservation of Nature (IUCN). Except for endemic species, the symbols apply to the species' worldwide status, not their status solely in Hawaii or the status of listed Hawaiian subspecies. The symbols and their meanings, in increasing order of peril, are:

Conservation status codes
LC = least concern	NT = near threatened	VU = vulnerable
EN = endangered	CR = critically endangered	EW = extinct in the wild
EX = extinct		

== Ducks, geese, and waterfowl ==
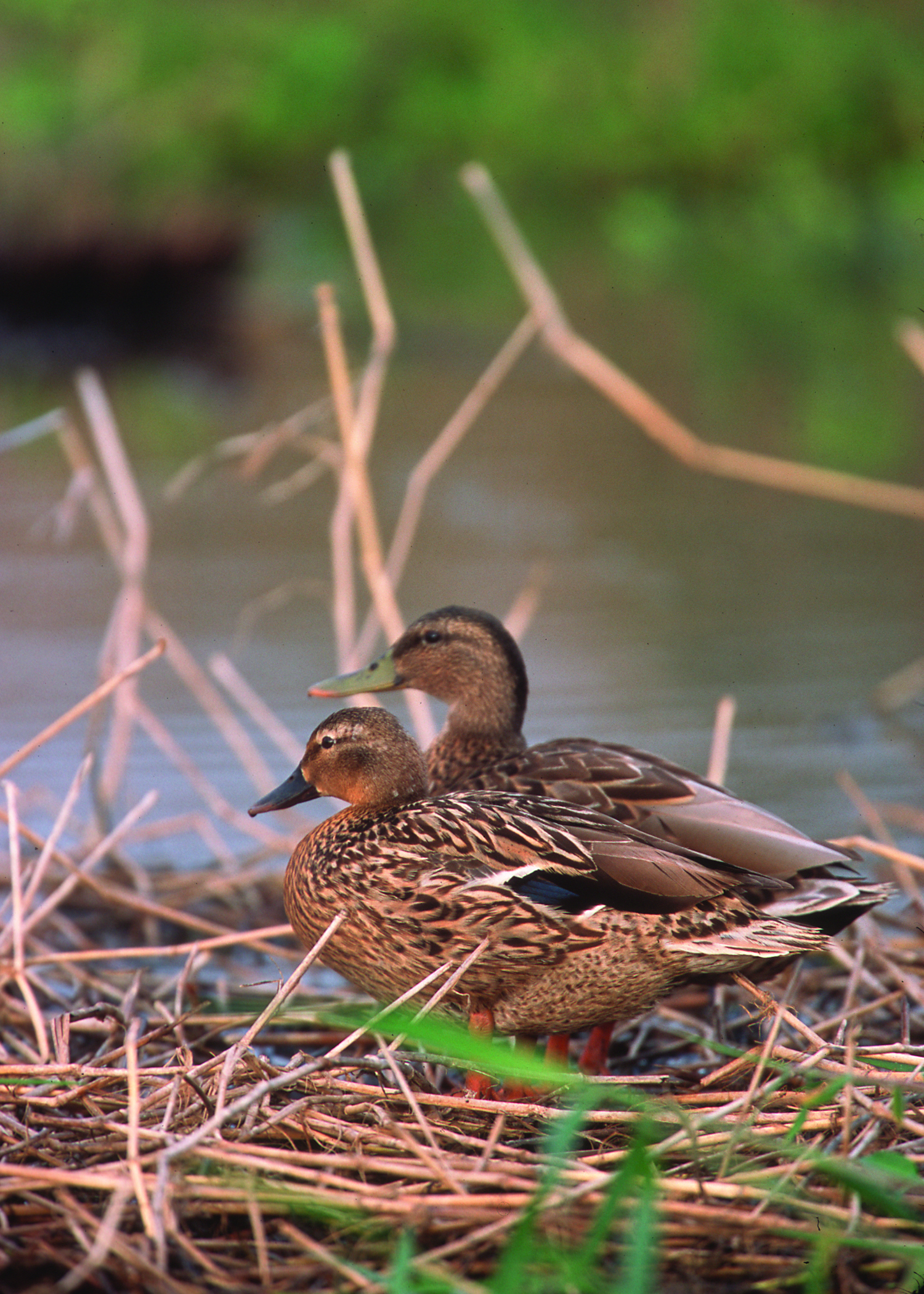
Hawaiian duck

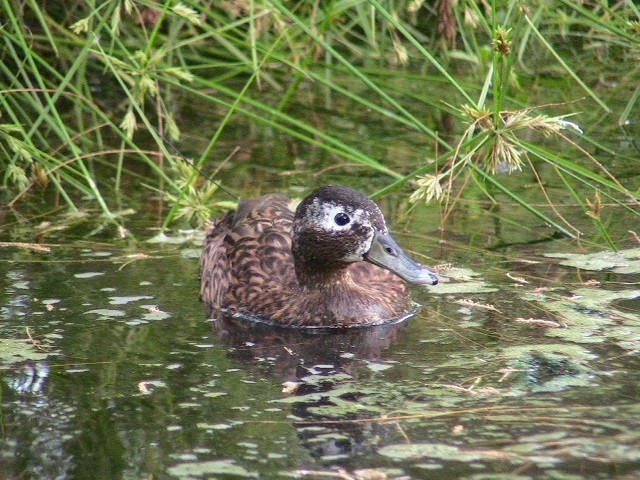
Laysan duck

Order: Anseriformes Family: Anatidae

The family Anatidae includes the ducks and most duck-like waterfowl, such as geese and swans. These birds are adapted to an aquatic existence with webbed feet, bills which are flattened to a greater or lesser extent, and feathers that are excellent at shedding water due to special oils.

- Emperor goose, Anser canagica (V) NT
- Snow goose, Anser caerulescens (V)
- Greater white-fronted goose, Anser albifrons (V) LC
- Brant, Branta bernicla LC
- Cackling goose, Branta hutchinsii LC
- Canada goose, Branta canadensis (V) LC
- Nene, Branta sandvicensis (En) VU
- Tundra swan, Cygnus columbianus (V) LC
- Baikal teal, Sibirionetta formosa (V) LC
- Garganey, Spatula querquedula LC
- Blue-winged teal, Spatula discors LC
- Cinnamon teal, Spatula cyanoptera (V) LC
- Northern shoveler, Spatula clypeata LC
- Gadwall, Mareca strepera LC
- Falcated duck, Mareca falcata (V) NT
- Eurasian wigeon, Mareca penelope LC
- American wigeon, Mareca americana LC
- Laysan duck, Anas laysanensis (En) CR
- Hawaiian duck, Anas wyvilliana (En) EN
- Mallard, Anas platyrhynchos LC
- Northern pintail, Anas acuta LC
- Green-winged teal, Anas crecca LC
- Canvasback, Aythya valisineria (V) LC
- Redhead, Aythya americana (V) LC
- Common pochard, Aythya ferina (V) LC
- Ring-necked duck, Aythya collaris LC
- Tufted duck, Aythya fuligula (V) LC
- Greater scaup, Aythya marila LC
- Lesser scaup, Aythya affinis LC
- Harlequin duck, Histrionicus histrionicus (V) LC
- Surf scoter, Melanitta perspicillata (V) LC
- Black scoter, Melanitta americana (V) NT
- Long-tailed duck, Clangula hyemalis (V) VU
- Bufflehead, Bucephala albeola LC
- Common goldeneye, Bucephala clangula (V) LC
- Hooded merganser, Lophodytes cucullatus (V) LC
- Common merganser, Mergus merganser (V) LC
- Red-breasted merganser, Mergus serrator (V) LC
- Ruddy duck, Oxyura jamaicensis (V) LC

== New World quail ==
Order: Galliformes Family: Odontophoridae

The New World quails are small, plump terrestrial birds only distantly related to the quails of the Old World, but named for their similar appearance and habits.

- California quail, Callipepla californica (I) LC
- Gambel's quail, Callipepla gambelii (I) LC

== Pheasants, grouse, and allies ==
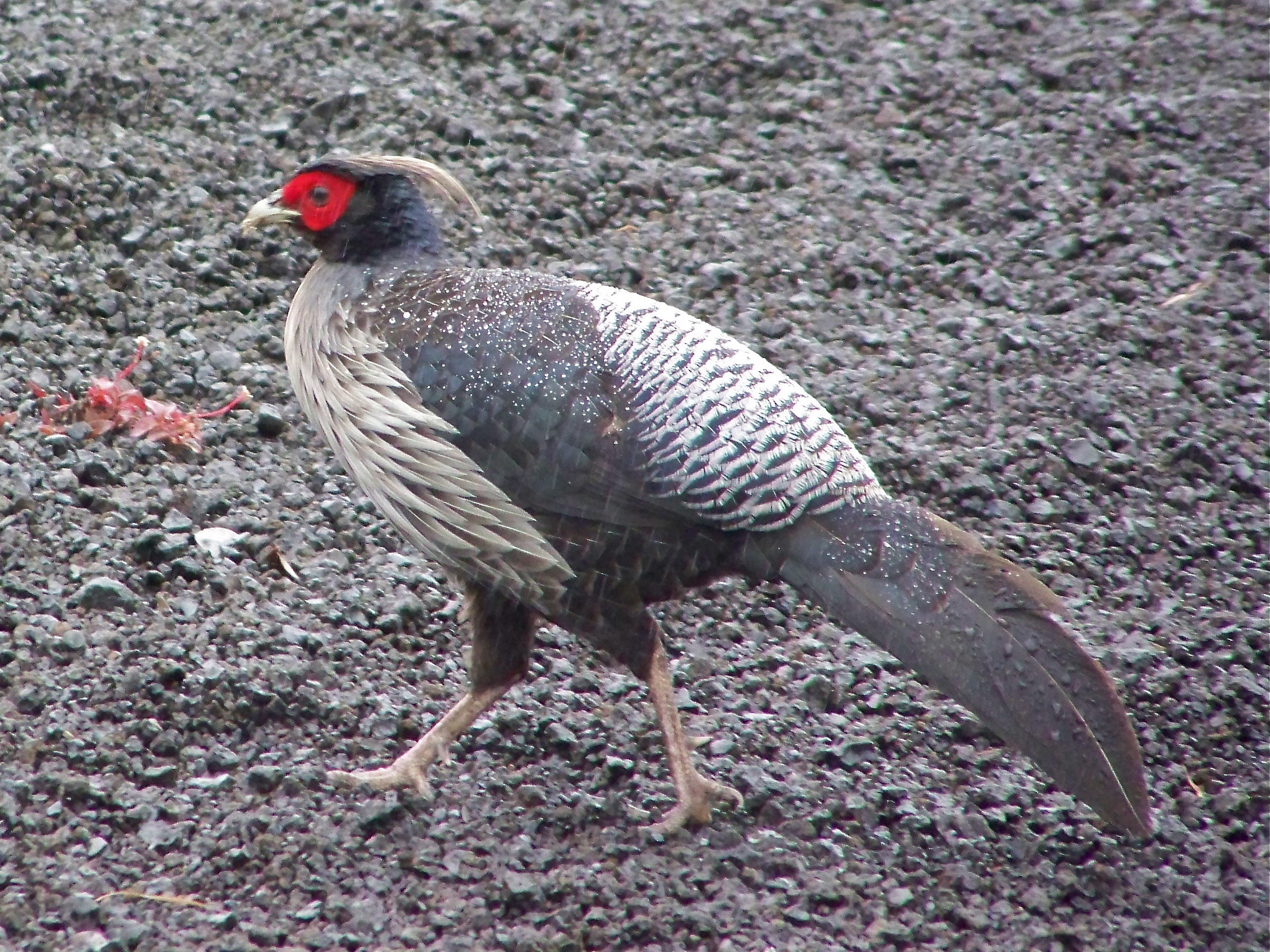
Kalij pheasant

Order: Galliformes Family: Phasianidae

Phasianidae consists of the pheasants and their allies. These are terrestrial species, variable in size but generally plump with broad relatively short wings. Many species are gamebirds or have been domesticated as a food source for humans.

- Wild turkey, Meleagris gallopavo (I) LC
- Chukar, Alectoris chukar (I) LC
- Ring-necked pheasant, Phasianus colchicus (I) LC
- Kalij pheasant, Lophura leucomelanos (I) LC
- Indian peafowl, Pavo cristatus (I) LC
- Gray francolin, Ortygornis pondicerianus (I) LC
- Black francolin, Francolinus francolinus (I) LC
- Red junglefowl, Gallus gallus (I) LC
- Japanese quail, Coturnix japonica (I) NT
- Erckel's francolin, Pternistis erckelii (I) LC

== Grebes ==
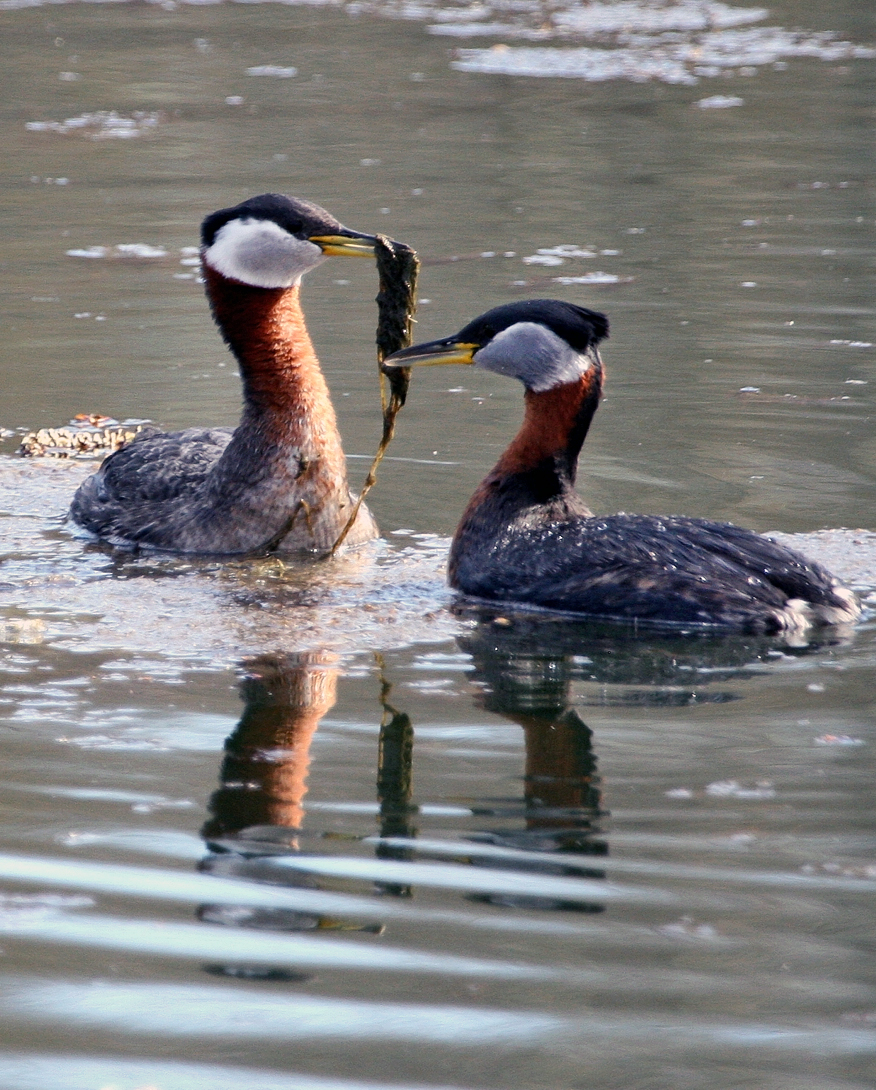
Red-necked grebe

Order: Podicipediformes Family: Podicipedidae

Grebes are small to medium-large freshwater diving birds. They have lobed toes and are excellent swimmers and divers. However, they have their feet placed far back on the body, making them quite ungainly on land.

- Pied-billed grebe, Podilymbus podiceps LC
- Horned grebe, Podiceps auritus (V) LC
- Red-necked grebe, Podiceps grisegena (V) LC
- Eared grebe, Podiceps nigricollis (V) LC

== Sandgrouse ==
Order: Pterocliformes Family: Pteroclidae

Sandgrouse have small, pigeon-like heads and necks, but sturdy compact bodies. They have long pointed wings and sometimes tails and a fast direct flight. Their legs are feathered down to the toes.

- Chestnut-bellied sandgrouse, Pterocles exustus (I) LC

== Pigeons and doves ==
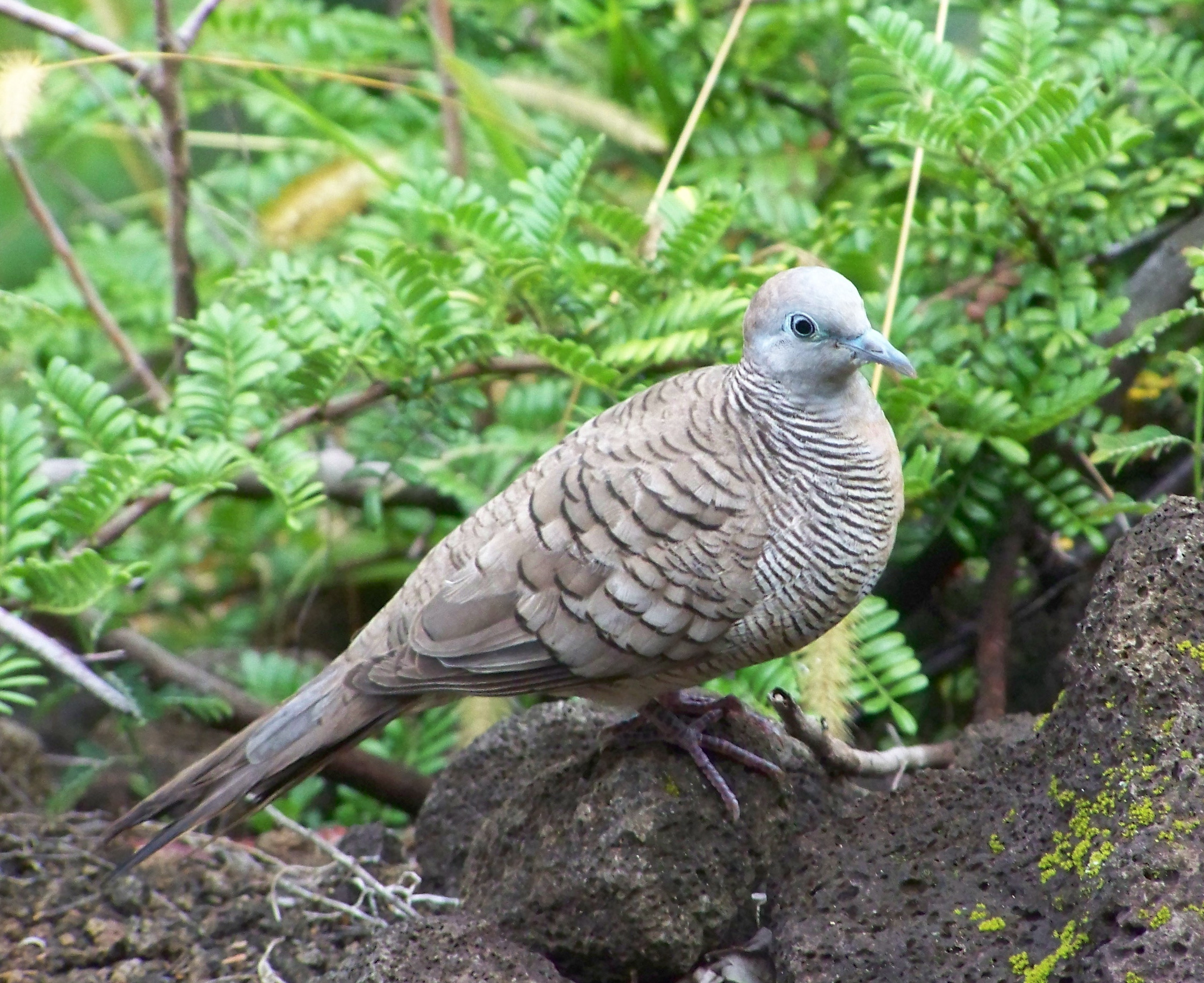
Zebra dove

Order: Columbiformes Family: Columbidae

Pigeons and doves are stout-bodied birds with short necks and short slender bills with a fleshy cere.

- Rock pigeon, Columba livia (I) LC
- Spotted dove, Spilopelia chinensis (I) LC
- Zebra dove, Geopelia striata (I) LC
- Mourning dove, Zenaida macroura (I) LC

== Cuckoos ==
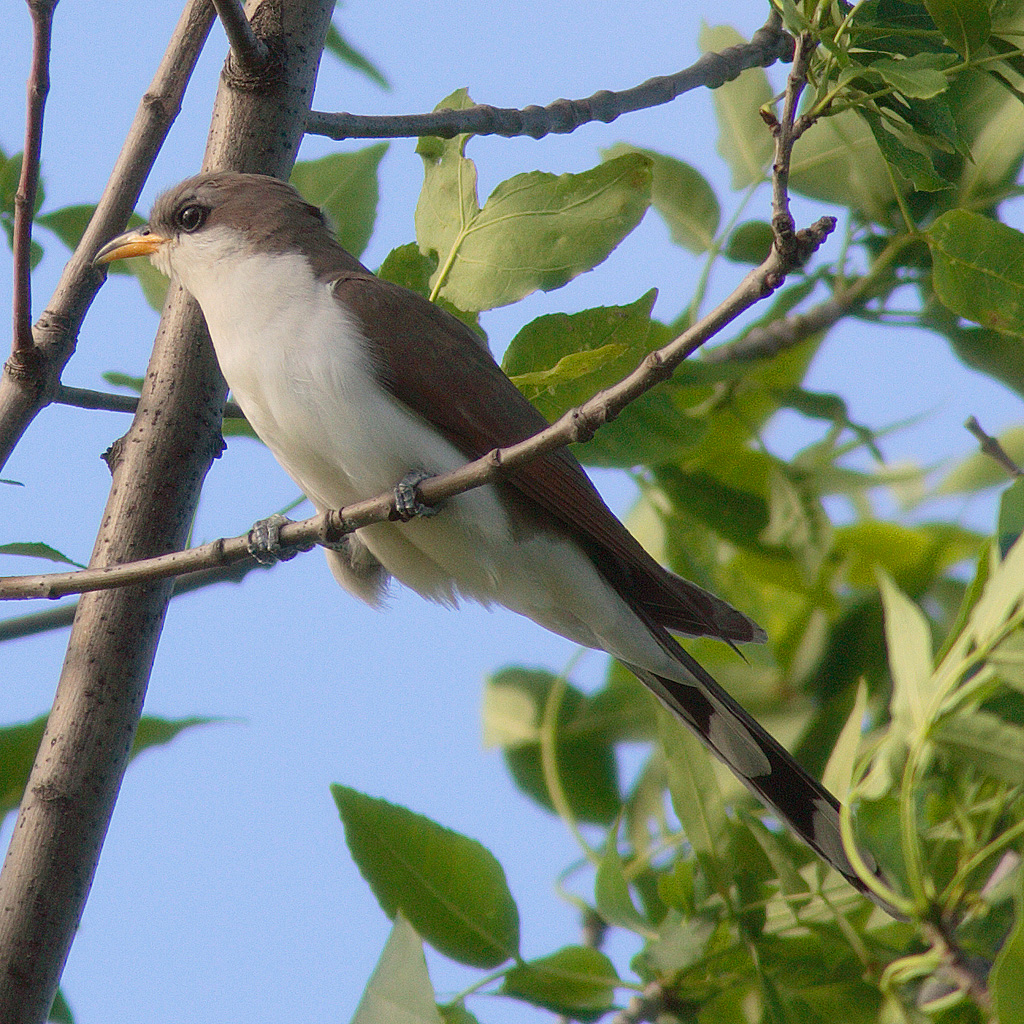
Yellow-billed cuckoo

Order: Cuculiformes Family: Cuculidae

The family Cuculidae includes cuckoos, roadrunners, and anis. These birds are of variable size with slender bodies, long tails, and strong legs.

- Common cuckoo, Cuculus canorus (V) LC
- Yellow-billed cuckoo, Coccyzus americanus (V) LC

== Nightjars and allies ==
Order: Caprimulgiformes Family: Caprimulgidae

Nightjars are medium-sized nocturnal birds that usually nest on the ground. They have long wings, short legs, and very short bills. Most have small feet, of little use for walking, and long pointed wings. Their soft plumage is cryptically colored to resemble bark or leaves.

- Common nighthawk, Chordeiles minor (V) LC

== Swifts ==
Order: Caprimulgiformes Family: Apodidae

The swifts are small birds which spend the majority of their lives flying. These birds have very short legs and never settle voluntarily on the ground, perching instead only on vertical surfaces. Many swifts have long swept-back wings which resemble a crescent or boomerang.

- Mariana swiftlet, Aerodramus bartschi (I) EN
- Fork-tailed swift, Apus pacificus (V) LC

== Rails, gallinules, and coots ==
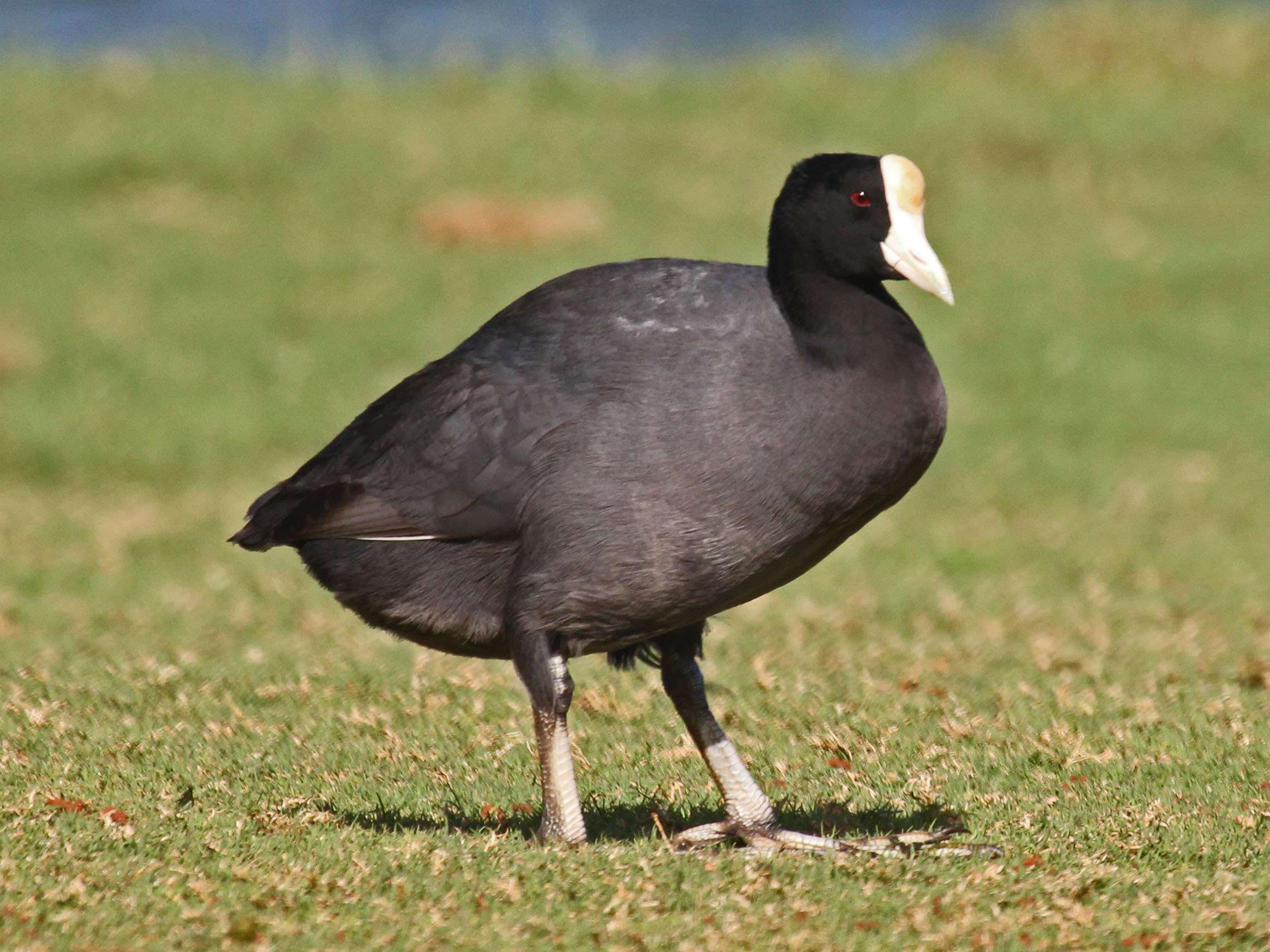
Hawaiian coot

Order: Gruiformes Family: Rallidae

Rallidae is a large family of small to medium-sized birds which includes the rails, crakes, coots, and gallinules. The most typical family members occupy dense vegetation in damp environments near lakes, swamps, or rivers. In general they are shy and secretive birds, making them difficult to observe. Most species have strong legs and long toes which are well adapted to soft uneven surfaces. They tend to have short, rounded wings and to be weak fliers.

- Sora, Porzana carolina (V) LC
- Common gallinule, Gallinula galeata
  - Hawaiian common gallinule, G. g. sandvicensis LC
- Hawaiian coot, Fulica alai (En) VU
- Laysan rail, Porzana palmeri (Xt) EX
- Hawaiian rail, Porzana sandwichensis (Xt) EX

== Cranes ==
Order: Gruiformes Family: Gruidae

Cranes are large, long-legged, and long-necked birds. Unlike the similar-looking but unrelated herons, cranes fly with necks outstretched, not pulled back. Most have elaborate and noisy courting displays or "dances".

- Sandhill crane, Antigone canadensis (V) LC

== Stilts and avocets ==
Order: Charadriiformes Family: Recurvirostridae

Recurvirostridae is a family of large wading birds which includes the avocets and stilts. The avocets have long legs and long up-curved bills. The stilts have extremely long legs and long, thin, straight bills.

- Black-winged stilt, Himantopus himantopus (V) LC
- (Hawaiian) black-necked stilt, Himantopus mexicanus knudseni LC
- American avocet, Recurvirostra americana (V) LC

== Lapwings and plovers ==
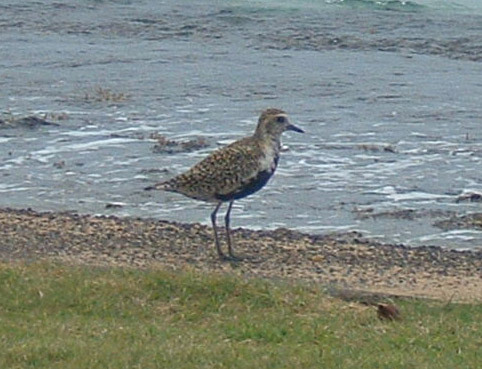
Pacific golden-plover

Order: Charadriiformes Family: Charadriidae

The family Charadriidae includes the plovers, dotterels, and lapwings. They are small to medium-sized birds with compact bodies, short thick necks, and long, usually pointed, wings. They are found in open country worldwide, mostly in habitats near water.

- Black-bellied plover, Pluvialis squatarola LC
- Pacific golden-plover, Pluvialis fulva LC
- Eurasian dotterel, Charadrius morinellus (V) LC
- Killdeer, Charadrius vociferus (V) LC
- Common ringed plover, Charadrius hiaticula (V) LC
- Semipalmated plover, Charadrius semipalmatus LC
- Lesser sand-plover, Charadrius mongolus (V) LC

== Sandpipers and allies ==
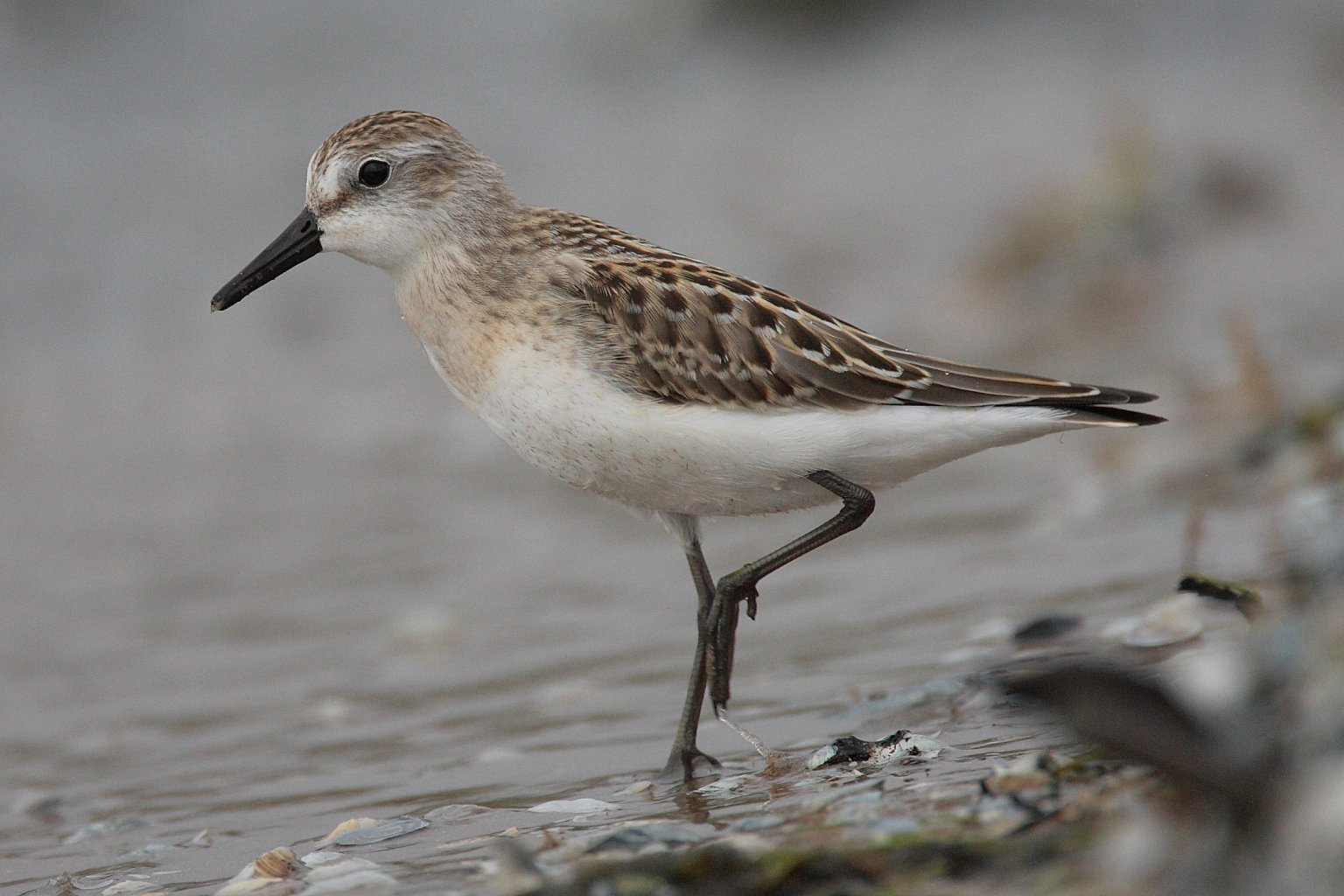
Semipalmated sandpiper

Order: Charadriiformes Family: Scolopacidae

Scolopacidae is a large diverse family of small to medium-sized shorebirds including the sandpipers, curlews, godwits, shanks, tattlers, woodcocks, snipes, dowitchers, and phalaropes. The majority of these species eat small invertebrates picked out of the mud or soil. Different lengths of legs and bills enable multiple species to feed in the same habitat, particularly on the coast, without direct competition for food.

- Bristle-thighed curlew, Numenius tahitiensis VU
- Whimbrel, Numenius phaeopus LC
- Far Eastern curlew, Numenius madagascariensis (V) EN
- Bar-tailed godwit, Limosa lapponica NT
- Black-tailed godwit, Limosa limosa (V) NT
- Hudsonian godwit, Limosa haemastica (V) LC
- Marbled godwit, Limosa fedoa (V) LC
- Ruddy turnstone, Arenaria interpres LC
- Red knot, Calidris canutus (V) NT
- Surfbird, Calidris virgata (V) LC
- Ruff, Calidris pugnax LC
- Sharp-tailed sandpiper, Calidris acuminata LC
- Stilt sandpiper, Calidris himantopus (V) LC
- Curlew sandpiper, Calidris ferruginea (V) LC
- Long-toed stint, Calidris subminuta (V) LC
- Red-necked stint, Calidris ruficollis (V) LC
- Sanderling, Calidris alba LC
- Dunlin, Calidris alpina LC
- Baird's sandpiper, Calidris bairdii (V) LC
- Little stint, Calidris minuta (V) LC
- Least sandpiper, Calidris minutilla LC
- White-rumped sandpiper, Calidris fuscicollis (V) LC
- Buff-breasted sandpiper, Calidris subruficollis (V) NT
- Pectoral sandpiper, Calidris melanotos LC
- Semipalmated sandpiper, Calidris pusilla (V) NT
- Western sandpiper, Calidris mauri LC
- Short-billed dowitcher, Limnodromus griseus (V) LC
- Long-billed dowitcher, Limnodromus scolopaceus LC
- Pin-tailed snipe, Gallinago stenura (V) LC
- Common snipe, Gallinago gallinago (V) LC
- Wilson's snipe, Gallinago delicata LC
- Terek sandpiper, Xenus cinereus (V) LC
- Common sandpiper, Actitis hypoleucos (V) LC
- Spotted sandpiper, Actitis macularia (V) LC
- Solitary sandpiper, Tringa solitaria (V) LC
- Gray-tailed tattler, Tringa brevipes (V) LC
- Wandering tattler, Tringa incana LC
- Lesser yellowlegs, Tringa flavipes LC
- Willet, Tringa semipalmata (V) LC
- Spotted redshank, Tringa erythropus (V) LC
- Greater yellowlegs, Tringa melanoleuca (V) LC
- Wood sandpiper, Tringa glareola (V) LC
- Marsh sandpiper, Tringa stagnatilis (V) LC
- Wilson's phalarope, Phalaropus tricolor (V) LC
- Red-necked phalarope, Phalaropus lobatus (V) LC
- Red phalarope, Phalaropus fulicarius LC

== Skuas and jaegers ==
Order: Charadriiformes Family: Stercorariidae

Skuas and jaegers are in general medium to large birds, typically with gray or brown plumage, often with white markings on the wings. They have longish bills with hooked tips and webbed feet with sharp claws. They look like large dark gulls, but have a fleshy cere above the upper mandible. They are strong, acrobatic fliers.

- South polar skua, Stercorarius maccormicki LC
- Pomarine jaeger, Stercorarius pomarinus LC
- Parasitic jaeger, Stercorarius parasiticus LC
- Long-tailed jaeger, Stercorarius longicaudus LC

== Auks, murres, and puffins ==
Order: Charadriiformes Family: Alcidae

Alcids are superficially similar to penguins due to their black-and-white colors, their upright posture, and some of their habits; However they are only distantly related to the penguins and are able to fly. Auks live on the open sea, only deliberately coming ashore to nest.

- Ancient murrelet, Synthliboramphus antiquus (V) LC
- Parakeet auklet, Aethia psittacula (V) LC
- Rhinoceros auklet, Cerorhinca monocerata (V) LC
- Horned puffin, Fratercula corniculata (V) LC

== Gulls, terns, and skimmers ==
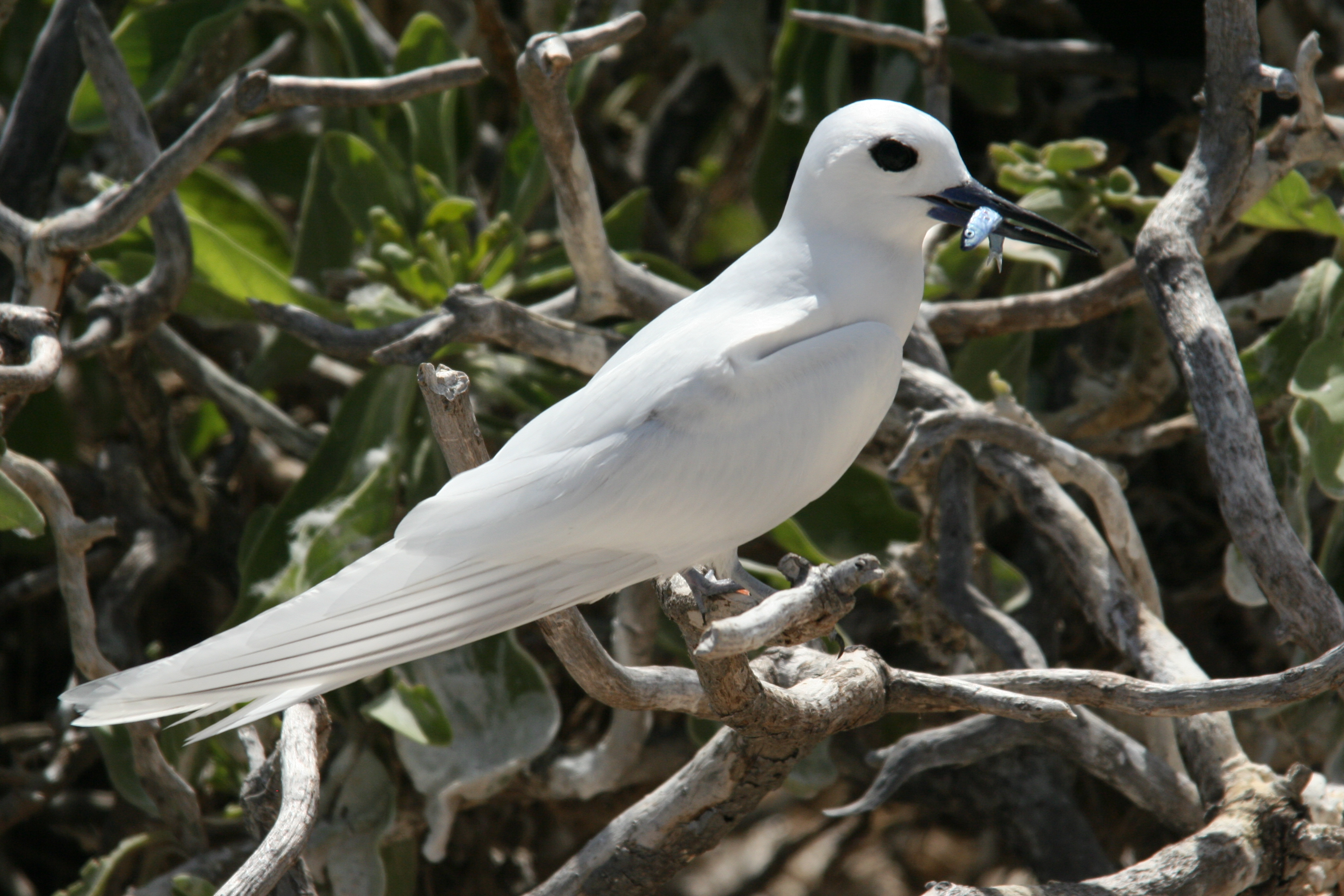
White tern

Order: Charadriiformes Family: Laridae

Laridae is a family of medium to large seabirds and includes gulls, terns, and skimmers. Gulls are typically gray or white, often with black markings on the head or wings. They have stout, longish bills and webbed feet. Terns are a group of generally medium to large seabirds typically with grey or white plumage, often with black markings on the head. Most terns hunt fish by diving but some pick insects off the surface of fresh water. Terns are generally long-lived birds, with several species known to live in excess of 30 years.

- Black-legged kittiwake, Rissa tridactyla (V) LC
- Bonaparte's gull, Chroicocephalus philadelphia (V) LC
- Black-headed gull, Chroicocephalus ridibundus (V) LC
- Laughing gull, Leucophaeus atricilla LC
- Franklin's gull, Leucophaeus pipixcan LC
- Common gull/short-billed gull, Larus canus/Larus brachyrhynchus (V) (Note: The Pyle list contains mew gull, which the AOS has split.) LC
- Ring-billed gull, Larus delawarensis LC
- Western gull, Larus occidentalis (V) LC
- California gull, Larus californicus (V) LC
- Herring gull, Larus argentatus LC
- Lesser black-backed gull, Larus fuscus (V) LC
- Slaty-backed gull, Larus schistisagus (V) LC
- Glaucous-winged gull, Larus glaucescens LC
- Glaucous gull, Larus hyperboreus (V) LC
- Brown noddy, Anous stolidus LC
- (Hawaiian) black noddy, Anous minutus melanogenys LC
- Blue-gray noddy, Anous ceruleus LC
- White tern, Gygis alba LC
- Sooty tern, Onychoprion fuscatus LC
- Gray-backed tern, Onychoprion lunatus LC
- Bridled tern, Onychoprion anaethetus (V) LC
- Little tern, Sternula albifrons LC
- Least tern, Sternula antillarum LC
- Gull-billed tern, Gelochelidon nilotica (V) LC
- Caspian tern, Hydroprogne caspia (V) LC
- Inca tern, Larosterna inca (V) NT
- Black tern, Chlidonias niger (V) LC
- White-winged tern, Chlidonias leucopterus (V) LC
- Whiskered tern, Chlidonias hybrida (V) LC
- Common tern, Sterna hirundo (V) LC
- Arctic tern, Sterna paradisaea LC
- Great crested tern, Thalasseus bergii (V) LC
- Sandwich tern, Thalasseus sandvicensis (V) LC
- Elegant tern, Thalasseus elegans (V) NT

== Tropicbirds ==
Order: Phaethontiformes Family: Phaethontidae

Tropicbirds are slender white birds of tropical oceans with exceptionally long central tail feathers. Their long wings have black markings, as does the head.

- White-tailed tropicbird, Phaethon lepturus LC
- Red-billed tropicbird, Phaethon aethereus (V) LC
- Red-tailed tropicbird, Phaethon rubricauda LC

== Loons ==
Order: Gaviiformes Family: Gaviidae

Loons are aquatic birds, the size of a large duck, to which they are unrelated. Their plumage is largely gray or black, and they have spear-shaped bills. Loons swim well and fly adequately, but are almost hopeless on land, because their legs are placed towards the rear of the body.

- Pacific loon, Gavia pacifica (V) LC

== Albatrosses ==
Order: Procellariiformes Family: Diomedeidae

The albatrosses are amongst the largest of flying birds, and the great albatrosses from the genus Diomedea have the largest wingspans of any extant birds.

- Salvin's albatross, Thalassarche salvini (V) VU
- Laysan albatross, Phoebastria immutabilis (En) NT (99% of the total population breeds in the Hawaiian Islands.)
- Black-footed albatross, Phoebastria nigripes (En) NT (More than 95% of the total population breeds in the Hawaiian Islands.)
- Short-tailed albatross, Phoebastria albatrus VU

== Southern storm-petrels ==
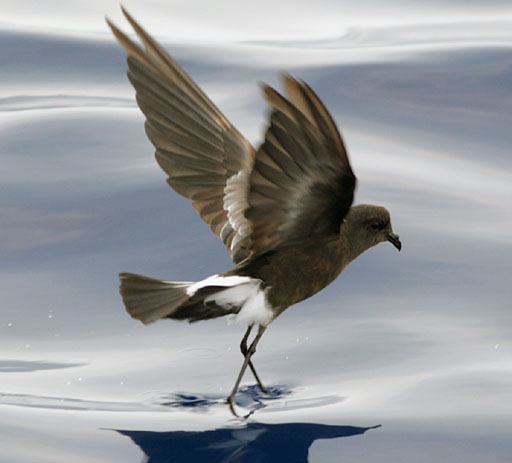
Wilson's storm-petrel

Order: Procellariiformes Family: Oceanitidae

The storm-petrels are the smallest seabirds, relatives of the petrels, feeding on planktonic crustaceans and small fish picked from the surface, typically while hovering. The flight is fluttering and sometimes bat-like. Until 2018, this family's three species were included with the other storm-petrels in family Hydrobatidae.

- Wilson's storm-petrel, Oceanites oceanicus LC

== Northern storm-petrels ==
Order: Procellariiformes Family: Hydrobatidae

Though the members of this family are similar in many respects to the southern storm-petrels, including their general appearance and habits, there are enough genetic differences to warrant their placement in a separate family.

- Leach's storm-petrel, Hydrobates leucorhous LC
- Band-rumped storm-petrel, Hydrobates castro LC
- Tristram's storm-petrel, Hydrobates tristrami NT

== Shearwaters and petrels ==
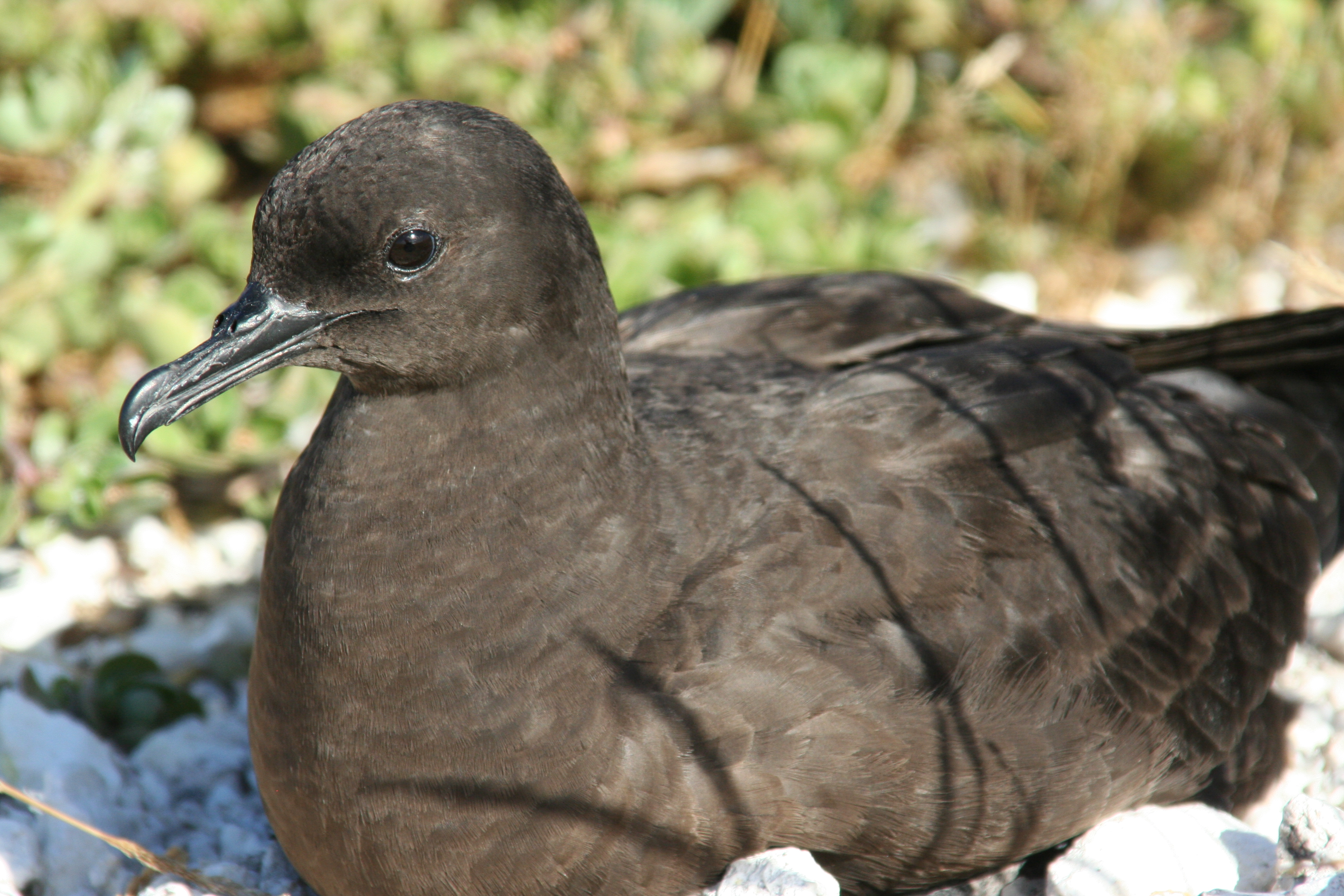
Christmas shearwater

Order: Procellariiformes Family: Procellariidae

The procellariids are the main group of medium-sized "true petrels", characterized by united nostrils with medium septum and a long outer functional primary.

- Northern fulmar, Fulmarus glacialis LC
- Kermadec petrel, Pterodroma neglecta LC
- Herald petrel, Pterodroma heraldica LC
- Murphy's petrel, Pterodroma ultima NT
- Mottled petrel, Pterodroma inexpectata NT
- Juan Fernandez petrel, Pterodroma externa VU
- Hawaiian petrel Pterodroma sandwichensis (En) VU
- White-necked petrel, Pterodroma cervicalis VU
- Bonin petrel, Pterodroma hypoleuca (En) LC (Almost the entire world population is believed to breed in the Hawaiian Islands.)
- Black-winged petrel, Pterodroma nigripennis LC
- Cook's petrel, Pterodroma cookii VU
- Stejneger's petrel, Pterodroma longirostris (V) VU
- Bulwer's petrel, Bulweria bulwerii LC
- Jouanin's petrel, Bulweria fallax (V) NT
- Tahiti petrel, Pseudobulweria rostrata (V) NT
- Streaked shearwater, Calonectris leucomelas (V) LC
- Pink-footed shearwater, Ardenna creatopus (V) VU
- Flesh-footed shearwater, Ardenna carneipes LC
- Wedge-tailed shearwater, Ardenna pacificus LC
- Buller's shearwater, Ardenna bulleri VU
- Sooty shearwater, Ardenna grisea NT
- Short-tailed shearwater, Ardenna tenuirostris LC
- Christmas shearwater, Puffinus nativitatis LC
- Newell's shearwater, Puffinus newelli (Cr) CR
- Bryan's shearwater, Puffinus bryani CR

== Frigatebirds ==
Order: Suliformes Family: Fregatidae

Frigatebirds are large seabirds usually found over tropical oceans. They are large, black, or black and white, with long wings and deeply forked tails. The males have colored inflatable throat pouches. They do not swim or walk and cannot take off from a flat surface. Having the largest wingspan-to-body-weight ratio of any bird, they are essentially aerial, able to stay aloft for more than a week.

- Lesser frigatebird, Fregata ariel LC
- Great frigatebird, Fregata minor LC

== Boobies and gannets ==
Order: Suliformes Family: Sulidae

The sulids comprise the gannets and boobies. Both groups are medium-large coastal seabirds that plunge-dive for fish.

- Masked booby, Sula dactylatra LC
- Nazca booby, Sula granti (V) LC
- Brown booby, Sula leucogaster LC
- Red-footed booby, Sula sula LC

== Cormorants and shags ==
Order: Suliformes Family: Phalacrocoracidae

Cormorants are medium-to-large aquatic birds, usually with mainly dark plumage and areas of colored skin on the face. The bill is long, thin, and sharply hooked. Their feet are four-toed and webbed.

- Pelagic cormorant, Urile pelagicus (V) LC

== Herons, egrets, and bitterns ==
Order: Pelecaniformes Family: Ardeidae

The family Ardeidae contains the herons, egrets, and bitterns. Herons and egrets are medium to large wading birds with long necks and legs. Bitterns tend to be shorter necked and more secretive. Members of Ardeidae fly with their necks retracted, unlike other long-necked birds such as storks, ibises, and spoonbills.

- American bittern, Botaurus lentiginosus (V) LC
- Great blue heron, Ardea herodias (V) LC
- Gray heron, Ardea cinerea (V) LC
- Great egret, Ardea alba (V) LC
- Intermediate egret, Ardea intermedia (V) LC
- Snowy egret, Egretta thula (V) LC
- Little blue heron, Egretta caerulea (V) LC
- Cattle egret, Bubulcus ibis (I) LC
- Green heron, Butorides virescens (V) LC
- Black-crowned night-heron, Nycticorax nycticorax LC

== Ibises and spoonbills ==
Order: Pelecaniformes Family: Threskiornithidae

The family Threskiornithidae includes the ibises and spoonbills. They have long, broad wings. Their bodies tend to be elongated, the neck more so, with rather long legs. The bill is also long, decurved in the case of the ibises, straight and distinctively flattened in the spoonbills.

- White-faced ibis, Plegadis chihi (V) LC

== Osprey ==
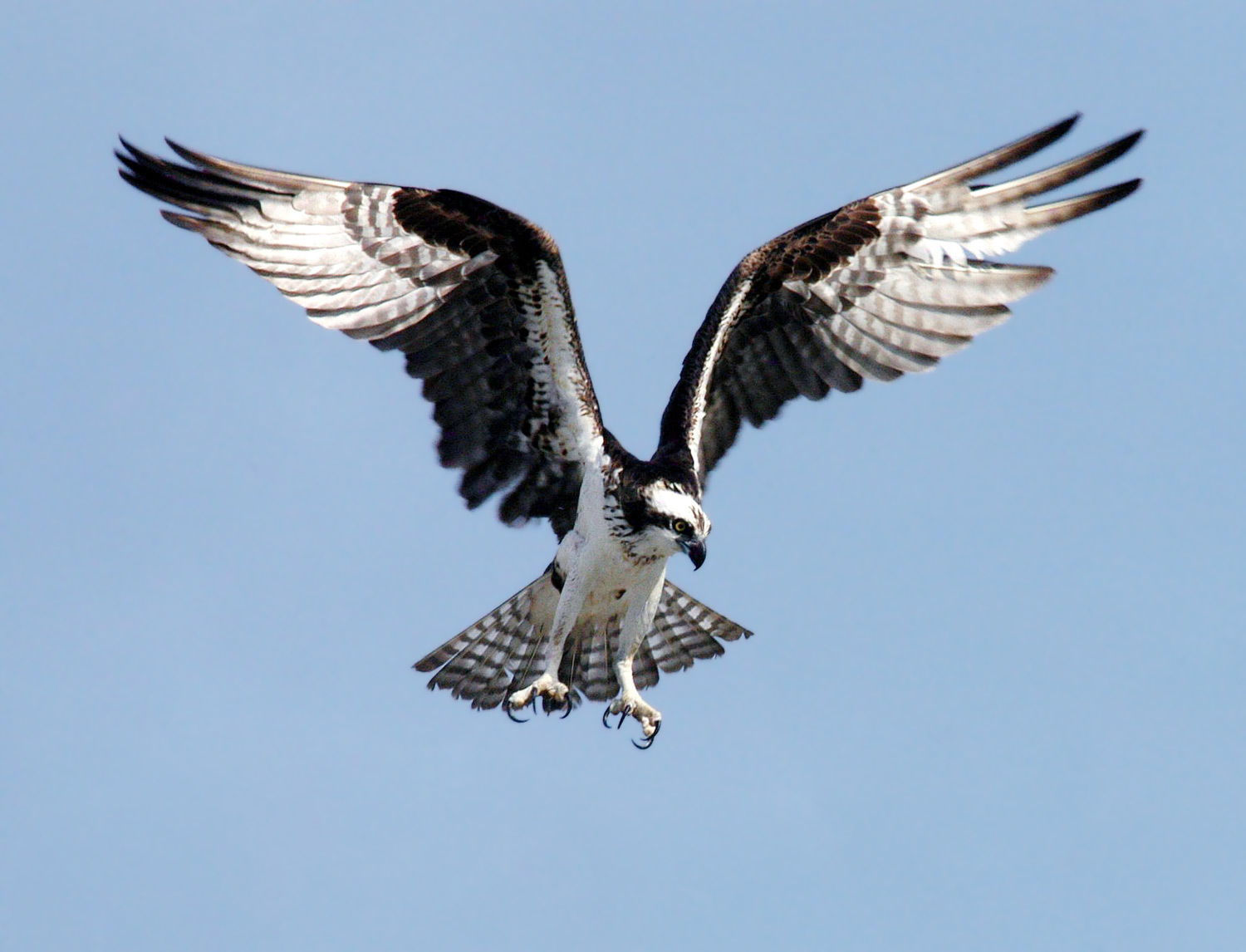
Osprey

Order: Accipitriformes Family: Pandionidae

Pandionidae is the fish-eating bird of prey, the osprey. The family is monotypic.

- Osprey, Pandion haliaetus LC

== Hawks, eagles, and kites ==
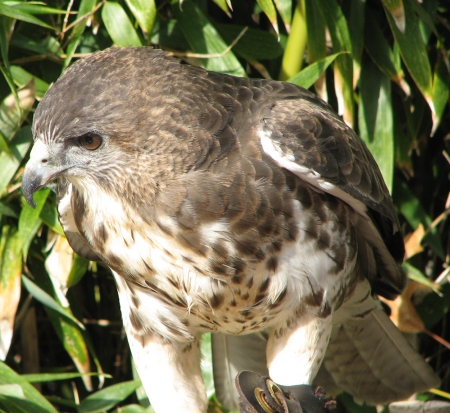
Hawaiian hawk

Order: Accipitriformes Family: Accipitridae

Accipitridae is a family of birds of prey which includes hawks, eagles, kites, harriers, and Old World vultures. These birds have very large powerful hooked beaks for tearing flesh from their prey, strong legs, powerful talons, and keen eyesight.

- Golden eagle, Aquila chrysaetos (V) LC
- Northern harrier, Circus hudsonius (V) LC
- Chinese sparrowhawk, Accipiter soloensis (V) LC
- Black kite, Milvus migrans (V) LC
- White-tailed eagle, Haliaeetus albicilla (V) LC
- Steller's sea eagle, Haliaeetus pelagicus (V) VU
- Hawaiian hawk, Buteo solitarius (En) NT
- Rough-legged hawk, Buteo lagopus (V) LC

== Barn owls ==
Order: Strigiformes Family: Tytonidae

Barn owls are medium to large owls with large heads and characteristic heart-shaped faces. They have long strong legs with powerful talons.

- American barn owl, Tyto furcata (I) LC

== Owls ==
Order: Strigiformes Family: Strigidae

Typical owls are small to large solitary nocturnal birds of prey. They have large forward-facing eyes and ears, a hawk-like beak, and a conspicuous circle of feathers around each eye called a facial disk. Hawaii has one native owl, which is a distinct subspecies.

- Snowy owl, Bubo scandiacus (V) LC
- (Hawaiian) short-eared owl or pueo, Asio flammeus sandwichensis LC

== Kingfishers ==
Order: Coraciiformes Family: Cerylidae

Kingfishers are medium-sized birds with large heads, long pointed bills, short legs, and stubby tails.

- Belted kingfisher, Megaceryle alcyon (V) LC

== Falcons and caracaras ==
Order: Falconiformes Family: Falconidae

Falconidae is a family of diurnal birds of prey, notably the falcons and caracaras. They differ from hawks, eagles, and kites in that they kill with their beaks instead of their talons.

- Merlin, Falco columbarius (V) LC
- Peregrine falcon, Falco peregrinus LC

== New World and African parrots ==
Order: Psittaciformes Family: Psittacidae

Characteristic features of parrots include a strong curved bill, an upright stance, strong legs, and clawed zygodactyl feet. Many parrots are vividly colored, and some are multi-colored. In size they range from 8 cm (3.1 in) to 1 m (3.3 ft) in length. Most of the more than 150 species in this family are found in the New World.

- Mitred parakeet, Psittacara mitratus (I) LC
- Red-masked parakeet, Psittacara erythrogenys (I) NT
- Red-crowned parrot, Amazona viridigenalis (I) EN

== Old World parrots ==
Order: Psittaciformes Family: Psittaculidae

Characteristic features of parrots include a strong curved bill, an upright stance, strong legs, and clawed zygodactyl feet. Many parrots are vividly colored, and some are multi-colored. In size they range from 8 cm (3.1 in) to 1 m (3.3 ft) in length. Old World parrots are found from Africa east across south and southeast Asia and Oceania to Australia and New Zealand.

- Rose-ringed parakeet, Psittacula krameri (I) LC
- Pale-headed rosella, Platycercus adscitus (I) (xd) LC (This species is not on the Check-list.)

== Monarch flycatchers ==
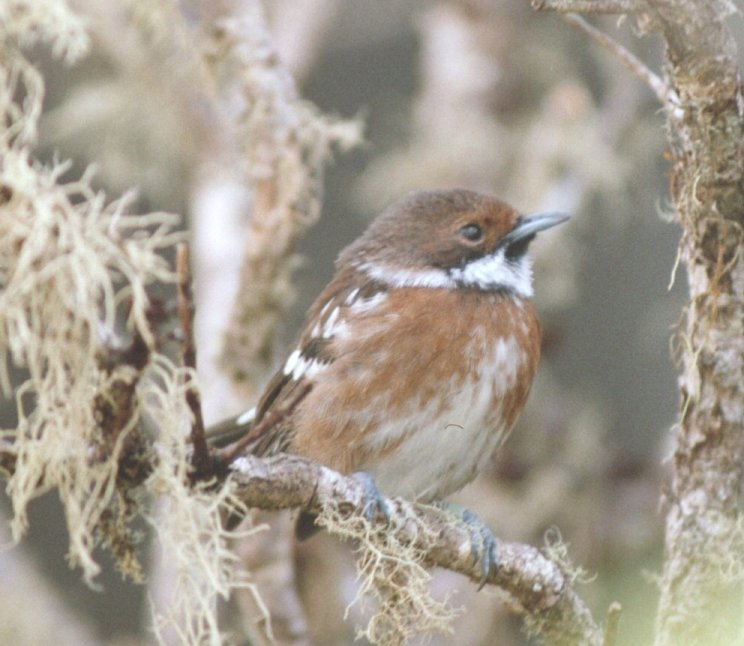
Hawaiʻi ʻelepaio

Order: Passeriformes Family: Monarchidae

The Monarchinae are a relatively recent grouping of a number of seemingly very different birds, mostly from the Southern Hemisphere, which are more closely related than they at first appear. Many of the approximately 140 species making up the family were previously assigned to other groups, largely on the basis of general morphology or behavior. With the new insights generated by the DNA-DNA hybridisation studies of Sibley and his co-workers toward the end of the 20th century, however, it became clear that these apparently unrelated birds were all descended from a common ancestor. The Monarchinae are small to medium-sized insectivorous passerines, many of which hunt by flycatching.

- Kauaʻi ʻelepaio, Chasiempis sclateri (En) VU
- Oʻahu ʻelepaio, Chasiempis ibidis (En) EN
- Hawaiʻi ʻelepaio, Chasiempis sandwichensis (En) VU

== Crows, jays, and magpies ==
Order: Passeriformes Family: Corvidae

The family Corvidae includes crows, ravens, jays, choughs, magpies, treepies, nutcrackers, and ground jays. Corvids are above average in size among the Passeriformes, and some of the larger species show high levels of intelligence.

- Hawaiian crow, Corvus hawaiiensis (En) EW
- Common raven, Corvus corax (V) LC

== Tits, chickadees, and titmice ==
Order: Passeriformes Family: Paridae

The Paridae are mainly small stocky woodland species with short stout bills. Some have crests. They are adaptable birds, with a mixed diet including seeds and insects.

- Varied tit, Parus varius (I) (xd) LC

== Larks ==
Order: Passeriformes Family: Alaudidae

Larks are small terrestrial birds with often extravagant songs and display flights. Most larks are fairly dull in appearance. Their food is insects and seeds.

- Eurasian skylark, Alauda arvensis (I) LC

== Reed warblers and allies ==
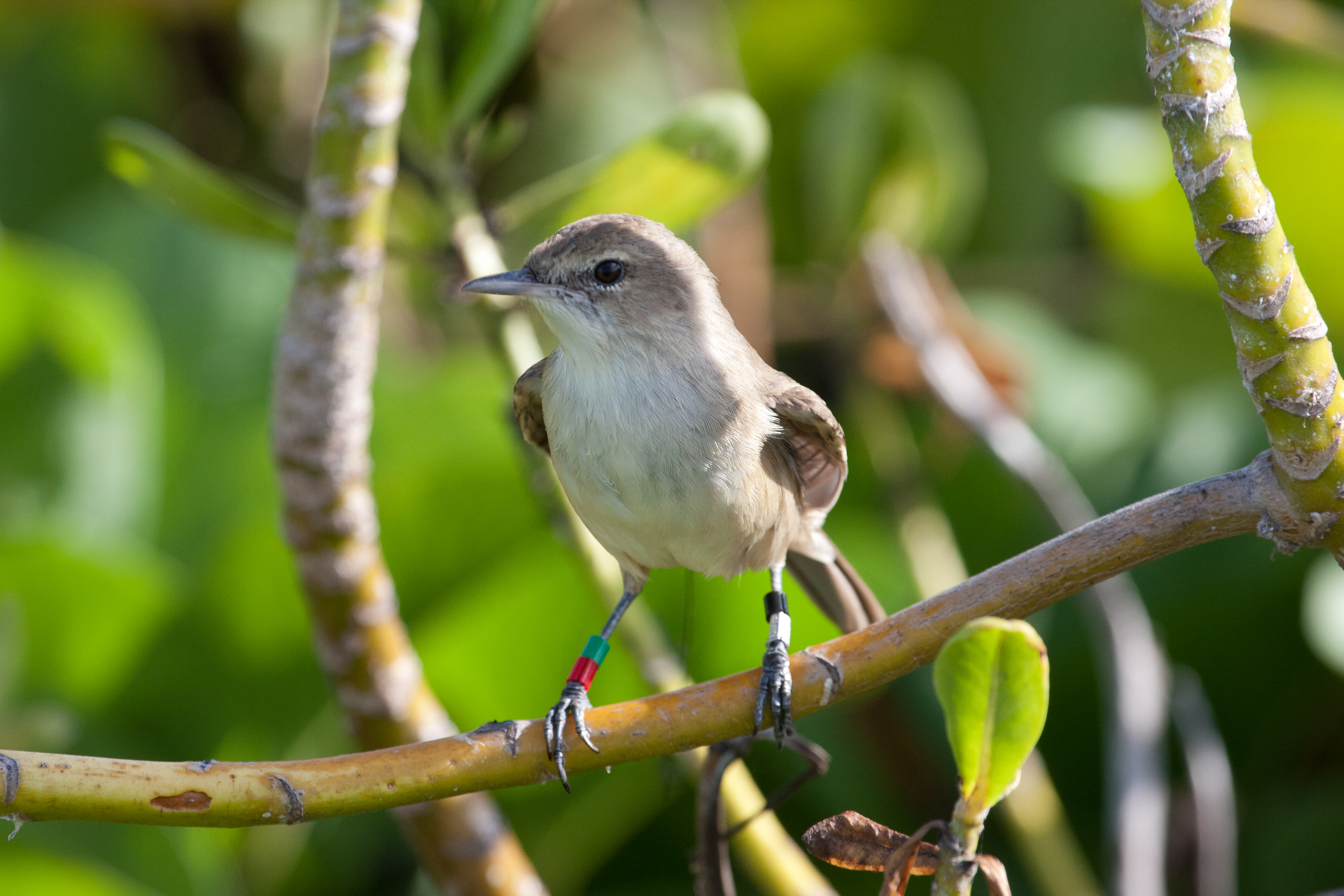
Millerbird

Order: Passeriformes Family: Acrocephalidae

The members of this family are usually rather large for "warblers". Most are rather plain olivaceous brown above with much yellow to beige below. They are usually found in open woodland, reedbeds, or tall grass. The family occurs mostly in southern to western Eurasia and surroundings, but also ranges far into the Pacific, with some species in Africa.

- Millerbird, Acrocephalus familiaris (En) CR

== Swallows ==
Order: Passeriformes Family: Hirundinidae

The family Hirundinidae is adapted to aerial feeding. They have a slender streamlined body, long pointed wings, and a short bill with a wide gape. The feet are adapted to perching rather than walking, and the front toes are partially joined at the base.

- Barn swallow, Hirundo rustica (V) LC
- Cliff swallow, Petrochelidon pyrrhonota (V) LC

== Bush-warblers and allies ==
Order: Passeriformes Family: Cettiidae

The members of this family are found throughout Africa, Asia, and Polynesia.

- Japanese bush-warbler, Horornis diphone (I) LC

== Bulbuls ==
Order: Passeriformes Family: Pycnonotidae

Bulbuls are a family of medium-sized passerine songbirds resident in Africa and tropical Asia. These are mostly frugivorous birds.

- Red-vented bulbul, Pycnonotus cafer (I) LC
- Red-whiskered bulbul, Pycnonotus jocosus (I) LC

== White-eyes, yuhinas, and allies ==
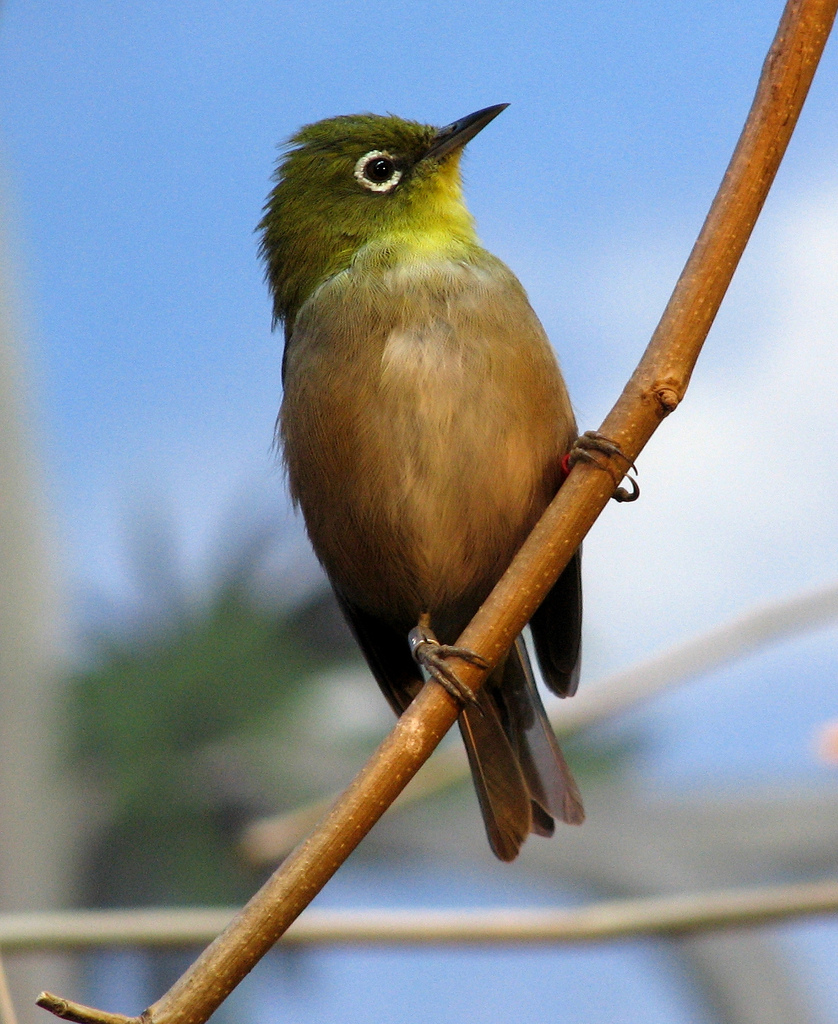
Japanese white-eye

Order: Passeriformes Family: Zosteropidae

The white-eyes are small passerine birds native to tropical and sub-tropical Africa, southern Asia and Australasia. The birds of this group are mostly of undistinguished appearance, their plumage above being generally some dull color like greenish-olive, but some species have a white or bright yellow throat, breast or lower parts, and several have buff flanks. But as indicated by their scientific name, derived from the Ancient Greek for girdle-eye, there is a conspicuous ring around the eyes of many species. They have rounded wings and strong legs. The size ranges up to 15 cm (6 inches) in length. All the species of white-eyes are sociable, forming large flocks which only separate on the approach of the breeding season. Though mainly insectivorous, they eat nectar and fruits of various kinds.

- Warbling white-eye, Zosterops japonicus (I) LC

== Laughingthrushes and allies ==
Order: Passeriformes Family: Leiothrichidae

The members of this family are diverse in size and coloration, though those of genus Turdoides tend to be brown or grayish. The family is found in Africa, India, and southeast Asia.

- Red-billed leiothrix, Leiothrix lutea (I) LC
- Chinese hwamei, Garrulax canorus (I) LC
- Greater necklaced laughingthrush, Ianthocincla pectoralis (I) LC

== Hawaiian honeyeaters ==
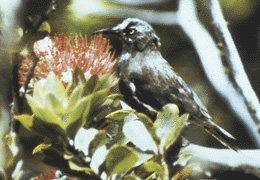
Kauaʻi ʻōʻō

Order: Passeriformes Family: Mohoidae

Honeyeaters prefer to flit quickly from perch to perch in the outer foliage, stretching up or sideways or hanging upside down at need. They have a highly developed brush-tipped tongue, which is frayed and fringed with bristles which soak up liquids readily. The tongue is flicked rapidly and repeatedly into a flower, the upper mandible then compressing any liquid out when the bill is closed. The Kauaʻi ʻōʻō was the last species to survive. It was last seen in 1987.

- Kauaʻi ʻōʻō, Moho braccatus (En) (Xt) EX
- Oʻahu ʻōʻō, Moho apicalis (En) (Xt) EX
- Bishop's ʻōʻō, Moho bishopi (En) (Xt) EX
- Hawaiʻi ʻōʻō, Moho nobilis (En) (Xt) EX
- Kioea, Chaetoptila angustipluma (En) (Xt) EX

== Mockingbirds and thrashers ==
Order: Passeriformes Family: Mimidae

The mimids are a family of passerine birds which includes thrashers, mockingbirds, tremblers, and the New World catbirds. These birds are notable for their vocalization, especially their remarkable ability to mimic a wide variety of birds and other sounds heard outdoors. The species tend towards dull grays and browns in their appearance.

- Northern mockingbird, Mimus polyglottos (I) LC

== Starlings ==
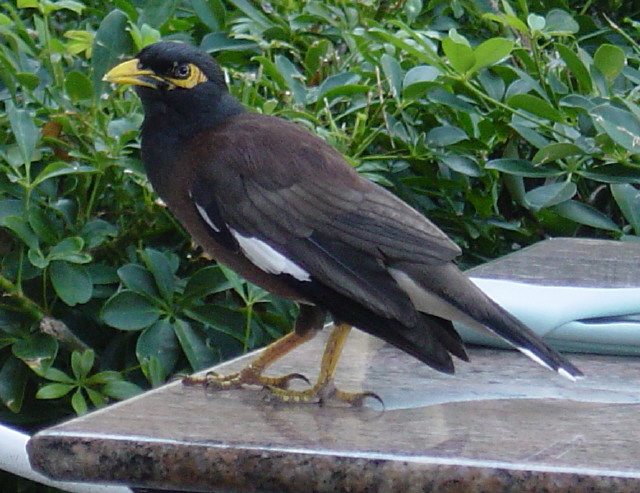
Common myna

Order: Passeriformes Family: Sturnidae

Starlings are small to medium-sized Old World passerine birds with strong feet. Their flight is strong and direct and most are very gregarious. Their preferred habitat is fairly open country, and they eat insects and fruit. The plumage of several species is dark with a metallic sheen.

- Common myna, Acridotheres tristis (I) LC

== Thrushes and allies ==
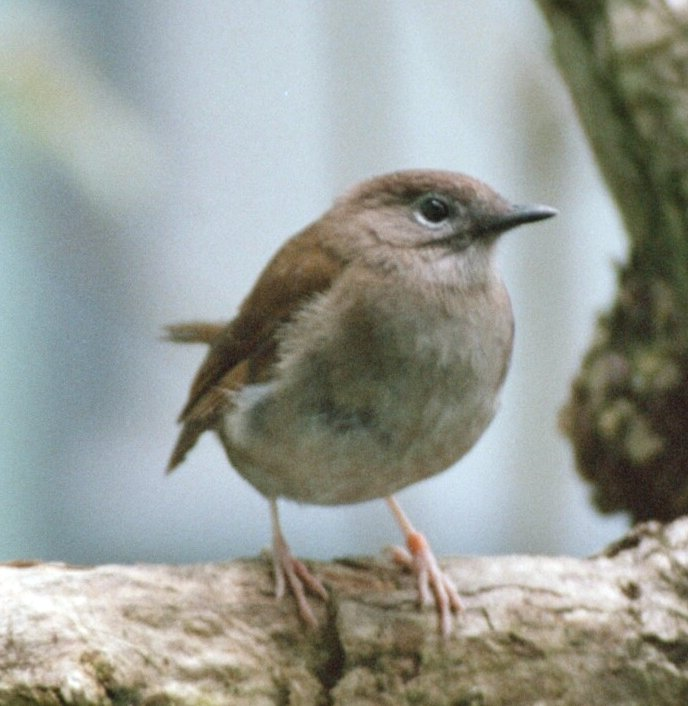
Puaiohi

Order: Passeriformes Family: Turdidae

The thrushes are a group of passerine birds that occur mainly but not exclusively in the Old World. They are plump, soft plumaged, small to medium-sized insectivores or sometimes omnivores, often feeding on the ground. Many have attractive songs.

- Kāmaʻo, Myadestes myadestinus (En) (Xt) EX
- ʻĀmaui, Myadestes woahensis (En) (Xt) EX
- Olomaʻo, Myadestes lanaiensis (En) (Xt) CR
- ʻŌmaʻo, Myadestes obscurus (En) VU
- Puaiohi, Myadestes palmeri (En) CR
- Eyebrowed thrush, Turdus obscurus (V) LC

== Old World flycatchers ==
Order: Passeriformes Family: Muscicapidae

The Old World flycatchers are a large family of small passerine birds restricted to the Old World. These are mainly small arboreal insectivores, many of which, as the name implies, take their prey on the wing. The appearance of these birds is highly varied, but they mostly have weak songs and harsh calls. The nest of most is a well-constructed cup in a tree or hedge.

- White-rumped shama, Copsychus malabaricus (I) LC

== Waxbills and allies ==
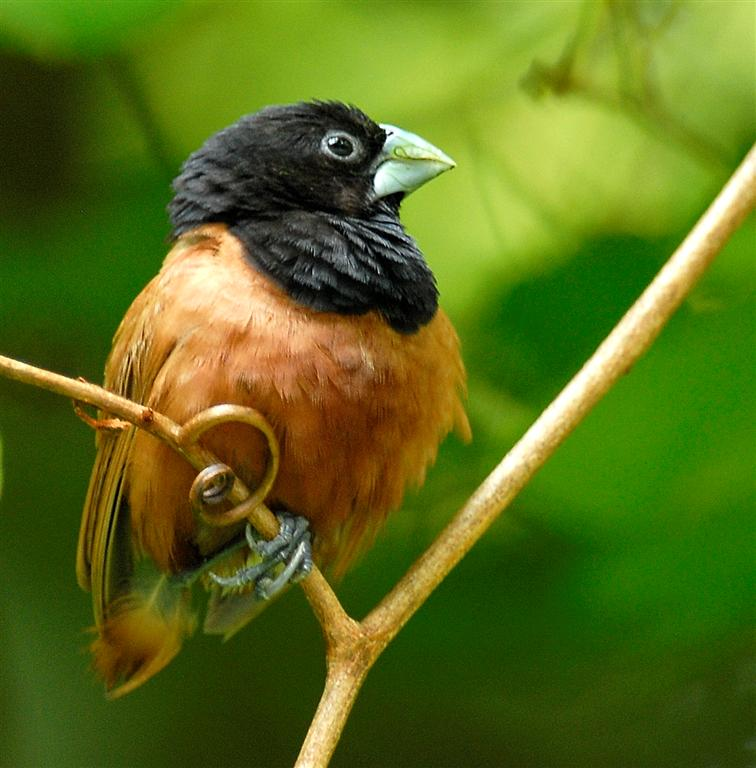
Chestnut munia

Order: Passeriformes Family: Estrildidae

The Estrildidae are small passerine birds of the Old World tropics and Australasia. They are gregarious and often colonial seed eaters with short, thick, but pointed bills. They are all similar in structure and habits, but vary widely in plumage colors and patterns. All the estrildids build large domed nests. Most are sensitive to cold and require a warm, usually tropical, habitat.

- African silverbill, Euodice cantans (I) LC
- Java sparrow, Padda oryzivora (I) VU
- Scaly-breasted munia, Lonchura punctulata (I) LC
- Chestnut munia, Lonchura atricapilla (I) LC
- Red avadavat, Amandava amandava (I) LC
- Lavender waxbill, Glaucestrilda caerulescens (I) LC
- Common waxbill, Estrilda astrild (I) LC

== Old World sparrows ==
Order: Passeriformes Family: Passeridae

Old World sparrows are small passerine birds. In general, sparrows tend to be small plump brownish or grayish birds with short tails and short powerful beaks. Sparrows are seed eaters, but they also consume small insects.

- House sparrow, Passer domesticus (I) LC

== Wagtails and pipits ==
Order: Passeriformes Family: Motacillidae

Motacillidae is a family of small passerine birds with medium to long tails. They include the wagtails, longclaws, and pipits. They are slender ground-feeding insectivores of open country.

- Olive-backed pipit, Anthus hodgsoni (V) LC
- Red-throated pipit, Anthus cervinus (V) LC
- American pipit, Anthus rubescens (V) LC

== Finches, euphonias, and allies ==
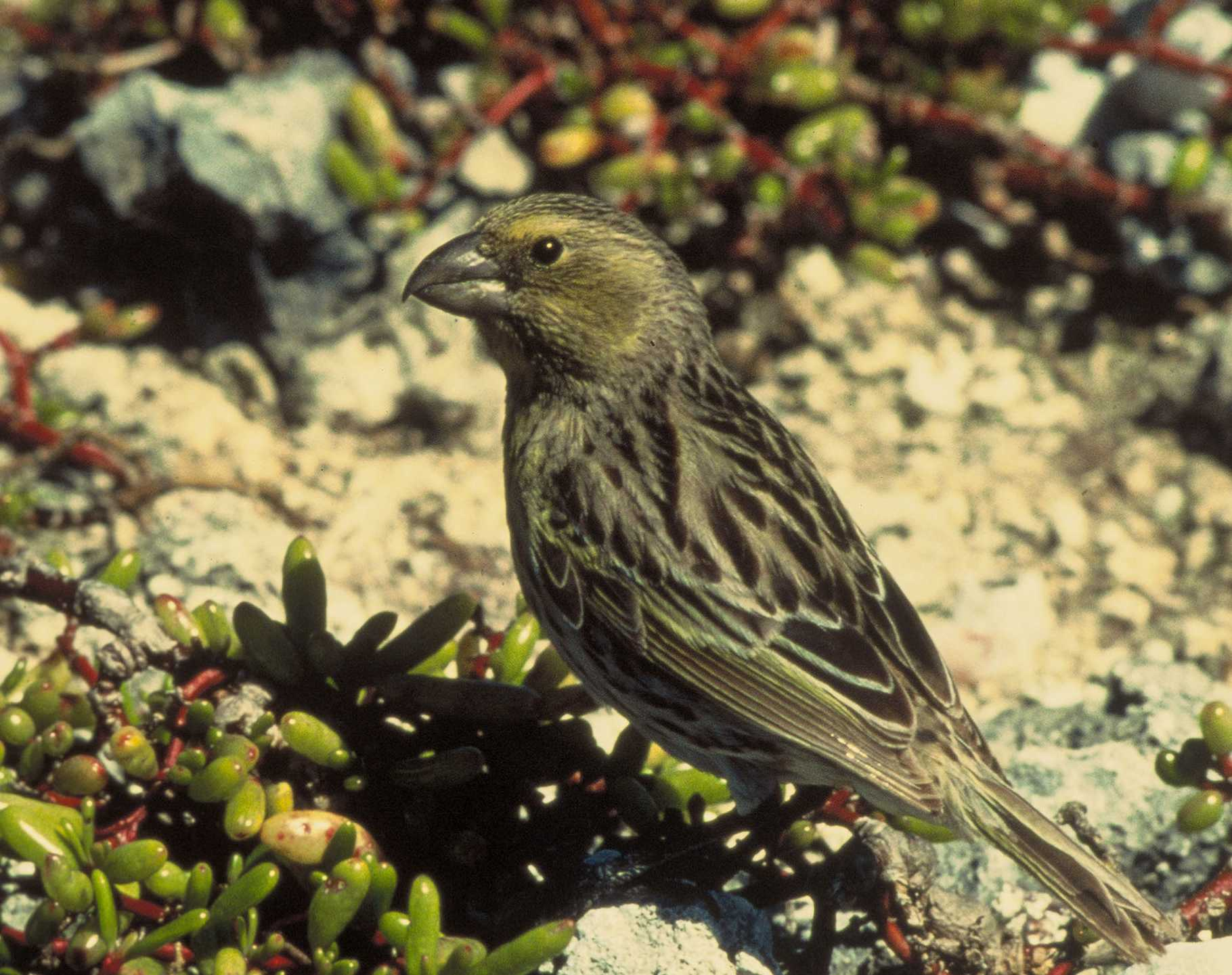
Laysan finch

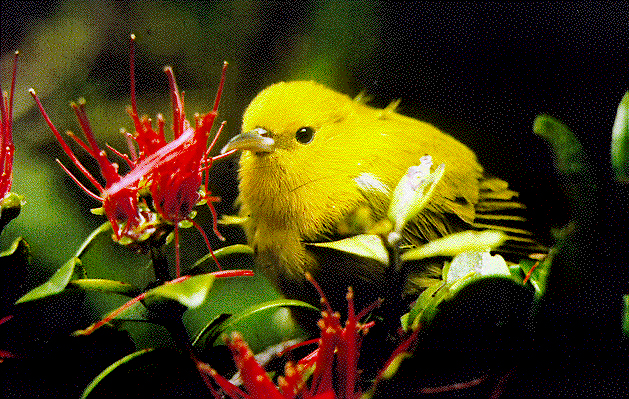
ʻAnianiau

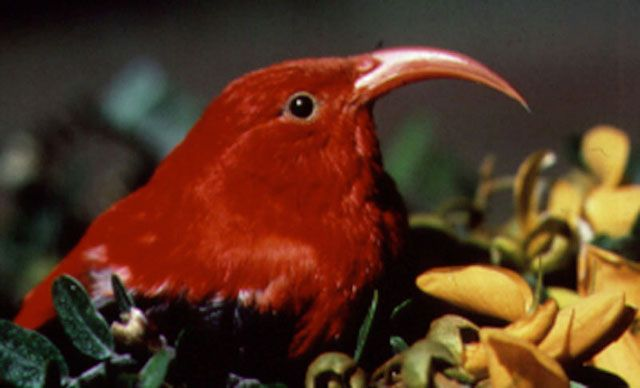
ʻIʻiwi

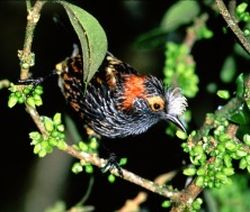
'Akohekohe

Order: Passeriformes Family: Fringillidae

Finches are seed-eating passerine birds, that are small to moderately large and have a strong beak, usually conical and in some species very large. All have twelve tail feathers and nine primaries. These birds have a bouncing flight with alternating bouts of flapping and gliding on closed wings, and most sing well. Most of the members of this family listed here are "Hawaiian honeycreepers". These endemic birds were formerly placed in their own family, Drepanididae. The wide range of bills in this group, from thick finch-like bills to slender downcurved bills for probing flowers, have arisen through adaptive radiation, where an ancestral finch has evolved to fill a large number of ecological niches.

- Brambling, Fringilla montifringilla (V) LC
- Poʻouli, Melamprosops phaeosoma (En) (Xt) EX
- ʻAkikiki, Oreomystis bairdi (En) CR
- Oʻahu ʻalauahio, Paroreomyza maculata (En) (Xt) CR
- Kākāwahie, Paroreomyza flammea (En) (Xt) EX
- Maui ʻalauahio, Paroreomyza montana (En) EN
- Palila, Loxioides bailleui (En) CR
- Laysan finch, Telespiza cantans (En) VU
- Nihoa finch, Telespiza ultima (En) CR
- Kona grosbeak, Chloridops kona (En) (Xt) EX
- Lesser koa-finch, Rhodacanthis flaviceps (En) (Xt) EX
- Greater koa-finch, Rhodacanthis palmeri (En) (Xt) EX
- ʻUla-ʻai-hawane, Ciridops anna (En) (Xt) EX
- ʻAkohekohe, Palmeria dolei (En) CR
- Laysan honeycreeper, Himatione fraithii (En) (Xt) EX
- ʻApapane, Himatione sanguinea (En) LC
- ʻIʻiwi, Drepanis coccinea (En) VU
- Hawaiʻi mamo, Drepanis pacifica (En) (Xt) EX
- Black mamo, Drepanis funerea (En) (Xt) EX
- ʻŌʻū, Psittirostra psittacea (En) (Xt) EX
- Lānaʻi hookbill, Dysmorodrepanis munroi (En) (Xt) EX
- Maui parrotbill, Pseudonestor xanthophrys (En) CR
- Kauaʻi nukupuʻu Hemignathus hanapepe (En) (Xt) CR
- Oʻahu nukupuʻu Hemignathus lucidus (En) (Xt) EX
- Maui nukupuʻu Hemignathus affinis (En) (Xt) CR
- ʻAkiapolaʻau, Hemignathus wilsoni (En) EN
- Lesser ʻakialoa, Akialoa obscura (En) (Xt) EX
- Kauaʻi ʻakialoa, Akialoa stejnegeri (En) (Xt) EX
- Oʻahu ʻakialoa, Akialoa ellisiana (En) (Xt) EX
- Maui Nui ʻakialoa, Akialoa lanaiensis (En) (Xt) EX
- ʻAnianiau, Magumma parva (En) VU
- Hawaiʻi ʻamakihi, Chlorodrepanis virens (En) LC
- Oʻahu ʻamakihi, Chlorodrepanis flava (En) VU
- Kauaʻi ʻamakihi, Chlorodrepanis stejnegeri (En) VU
- Greater ʻamakihi, Viridonia sagittirostris (En) (Xt) EX
- Hawaiʻi creeper, Loxops mana (En) EN
- ʻAkekeʻe, Loxops caeruleirostris (En) CR
- Oʻahu ʻakepa, Loxops wolstenholmei (En) (Xt)EX
- Maui ʻakepa, Loxops ochraceus (En) EX
- Hawaiʻi ʻakepa, Loxops coccineus (En) EN
- House finch, Haemorhous mexicanus (I) LC
- Common redpoll, Acanthis flammea (V) LC
- Yellow-fronted canary, Crithagra mozambica (I) LC
- Island canary, Serinus canaria (I) LC

== Longspurs and snow buntings ==
Order: Passeriformes Family: Calcariidae

The Calcariidae are a group of passerine birds that were traditionally grouped with the New World sparrows, but differ in a number of respects and are usually found in open grassy areas.

- Snow bunting, Plectrophenax nivalis (V) LC

== New World sparrows ==
Order: Passeriformes Family: Passerellidae

Until 2017, these species were considered part of the family Emberizidae. Most of the species are known as sparrows, but these birds are not closely related to the Old World sparrows which are in the family Passeridae. Many of these have distinctive head patterns.

- Savannah sparrow, Passerculus sandwichensis (V) LC

== Troupials and allies ==
Order: Passeriformes Family: Icteridae

The icterids are a group of small- to medium-sized, often colorful passerine birds. Most species have black as a predominant plumage color, often enlivened by yellow, orange, or red.

- Western meadowlark, Sturnella neglecta (I) LC

== Cardinals and allies ==
Order: Passeriformes Family: Cardinalidae

The cardinals are a family of robust, seed-eating birds with strong bills. They are typically associated with open woodland. The sexes usually have distinct plumages.

- Northern cardinal, Cardinalis cardinalis (I) LC

== Tanagers and allies ==
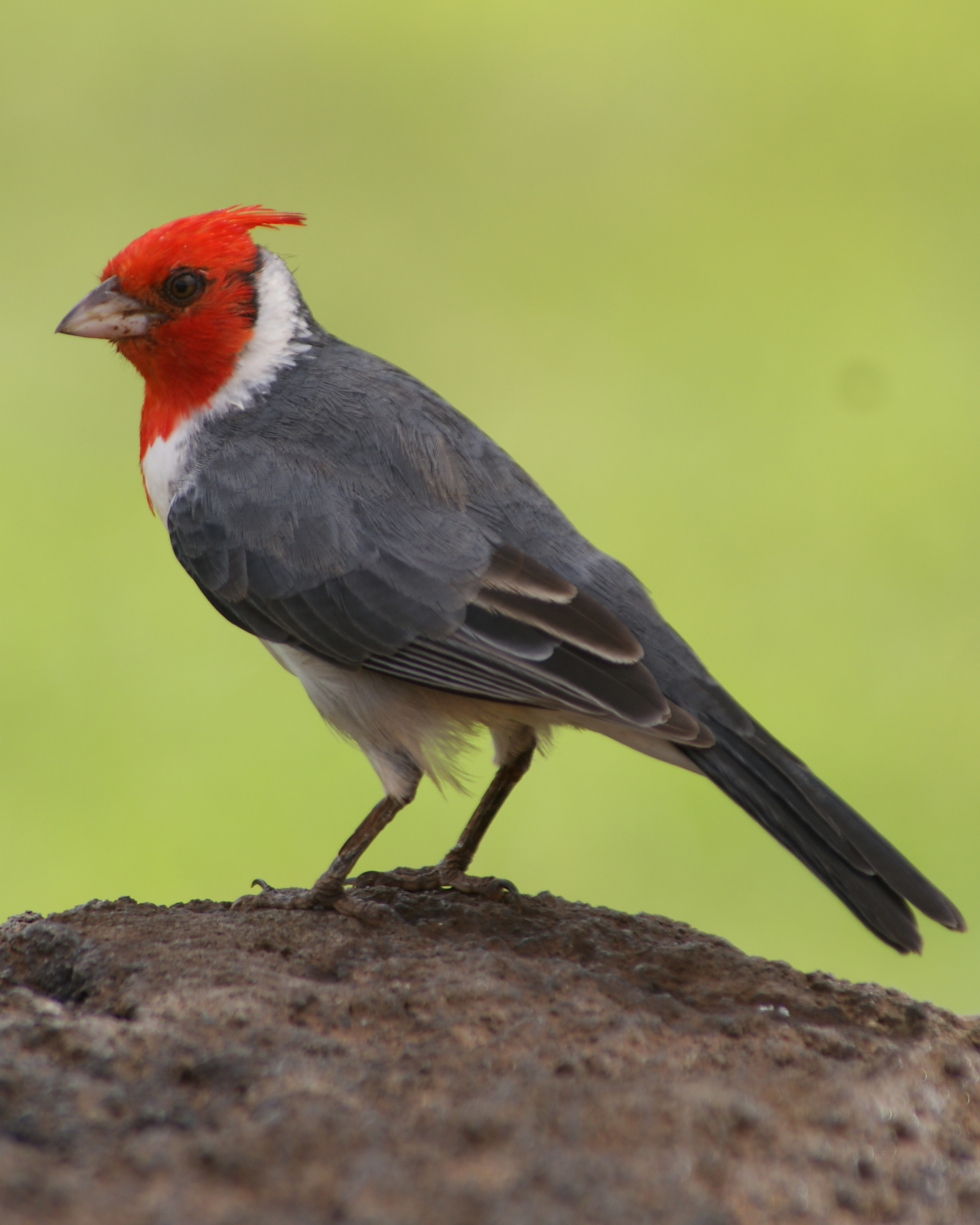
Red-crested cardinal

Order: Passeriformes Family: Thraupidae

The tanagers are a large group of small to medium-sized passerine birds restricted to the New World, mainly in the tropics. Many species are brightly colored. They are seed eaters, but their preference tends towards fruit and nectar.

- Red-crested cardinal, Paroaria coronata (I) LC
- Yellow-billed cardinal, Paroaria capitata (I) LC
- Saffron finch, Sicalis flaveola (I) LC
- Yellow-faced grassquit, Tiaris olivaceus (I) LC

== See also ==
- List of birds
- Lists of birds by region
- Endemic birds of Hawaii
- List of bird species introduced to the Hawaiian Islands
