= Hoopoe-billed ʻakialoa =

Hoopoe-billed ʻakialoa Temporal range: Early Holocene

Scientific classification
- Kingdom: Animalia
- Phylum: Chordata
- Class: Aves
- Order: Passeriformes
- Family: Fringillidae
- Subfamily: Carduelinae
- Genus: †Akialoa
- Species: †A. upupirostris

Binomial name
- †Akialoa upupirostris (Olson & James, 1991)

Synonyms
- Hemignathus upupirostris

Extinct species of bird

The hoopoe-billed ʻakialoa (Akialoa upupirostris) is an extinct species of Hawaiian honeycreeper in the subfamily Carduelinae of the family Fringillidae. It inhabited the islands of Kauaʻi and Oʻahu in Hawaii.

== Description ==
Subfossil remains have been found on the Hawaiian islands of Kauaʻi and Oʻahu. The species was apparently slightly larger than others in the genus Akialoa. A similar but smaller bird from Maui has been discovered but is as yet undescribed.

The specific name, upupirostris, is derived from the Latin upupa, hoopoe, and rostrum, bill, and refers to the long sickle-shaped bill which resembles that of the hoopoe.

== Extinction ==
The species presumably became extinct after the arrival of humans in Hawaii and is known only from the fossil record.
