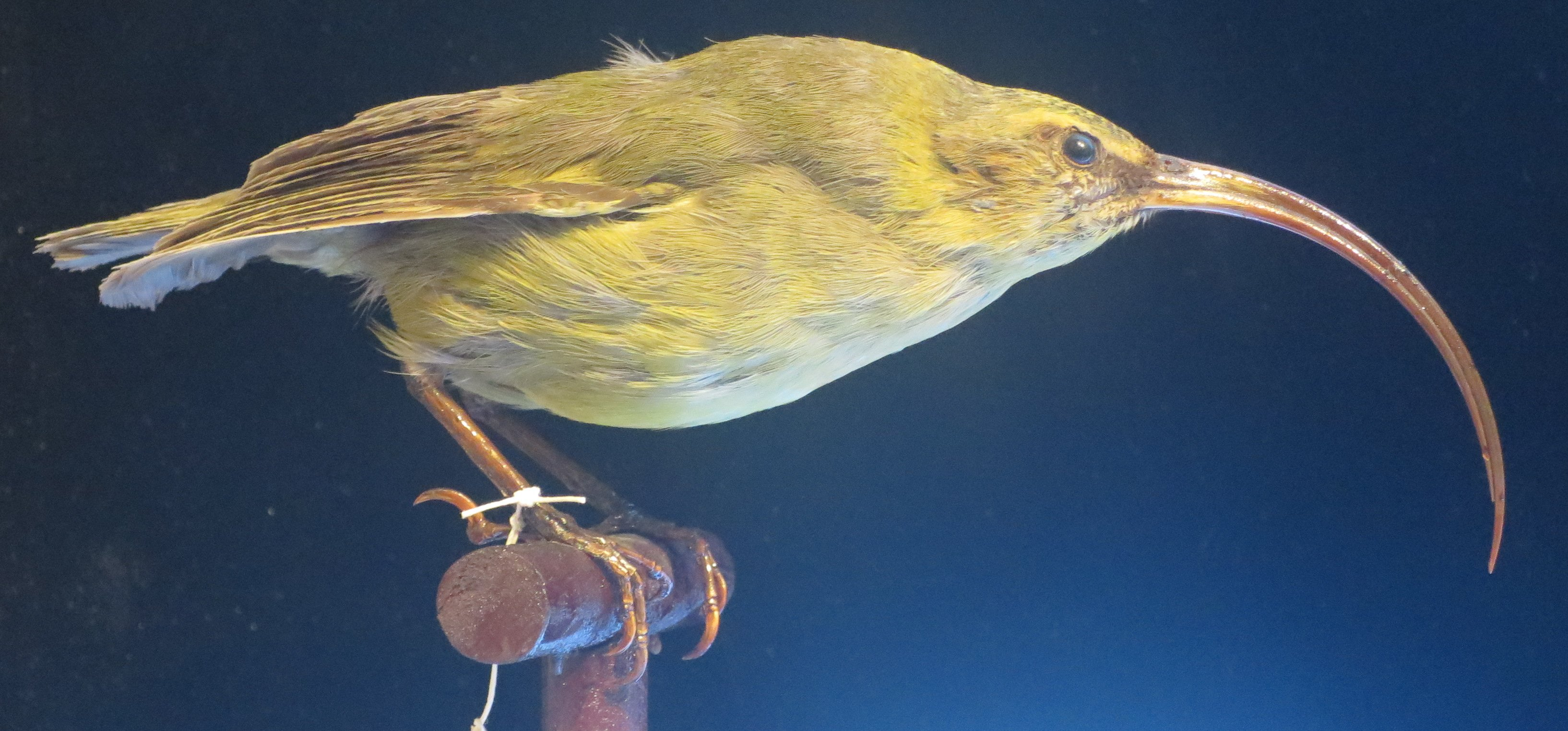
- Kauaʻi ʻakialoa (Akialoa stejnegeri)

Scientific classification
- Kingdom: Animalia
- Phylum: Chordata
- Class: Aves
- Order: Passeriformes
- Family: Fringillidae
- Subfamily: Carduelinae
- Genus: †Akialoa; Olson & James, 1995

Type species
- Akialoa obscura Gmelin, 1788

Species
- See text

= Akialoa =

Akialoa Temporal range: Quaternary

Extinct genus of birds

Akialoa is an extinct genus of Hawaiian honeycreeper in the subfamily Carduelinae of the family Fringillidae. The ʻakialoa species are all extinct, but they formerly occurred throughout Hawaii.

== Species ==
The Oʻahu ʻakialoa, Maui Nui ʻakialoa, and Kauaʻi ʻakialoa were previously considered a single species, called the greater ʻakialoa.

There are 7 species in this genus, two of which are undescribed:

Image	Common name	Scientific name
	†Oʻahu ʻakialoa	†Akialoa ellisiana - extinct, 1837 (confirmed) or 1940 (unconfirmed)
	†Maui Nui ʻakialoa	†Akialoa lanaiensis - extinct, 1892
	†Lesser ʻakialoa	††Akialoa obscura - extinct, 1940
	†Kauaʻi ʻakialoa	†††Akialoa stejnegeri - extinct, 1969
	†Hoopoe-billed ʻakialoa	†Akialoa upupirostris - extinct, Holocene
		†Akialoa sp., Maui - extinct, Holocene
	†Giant ʻakialoa	†Akialoa sp. - extinct, Holocene

== See also ==
- Asteroid 378002 ʻAkialoa
- Hawaiian honeycreepers
- Extinct birds of Hawaii
