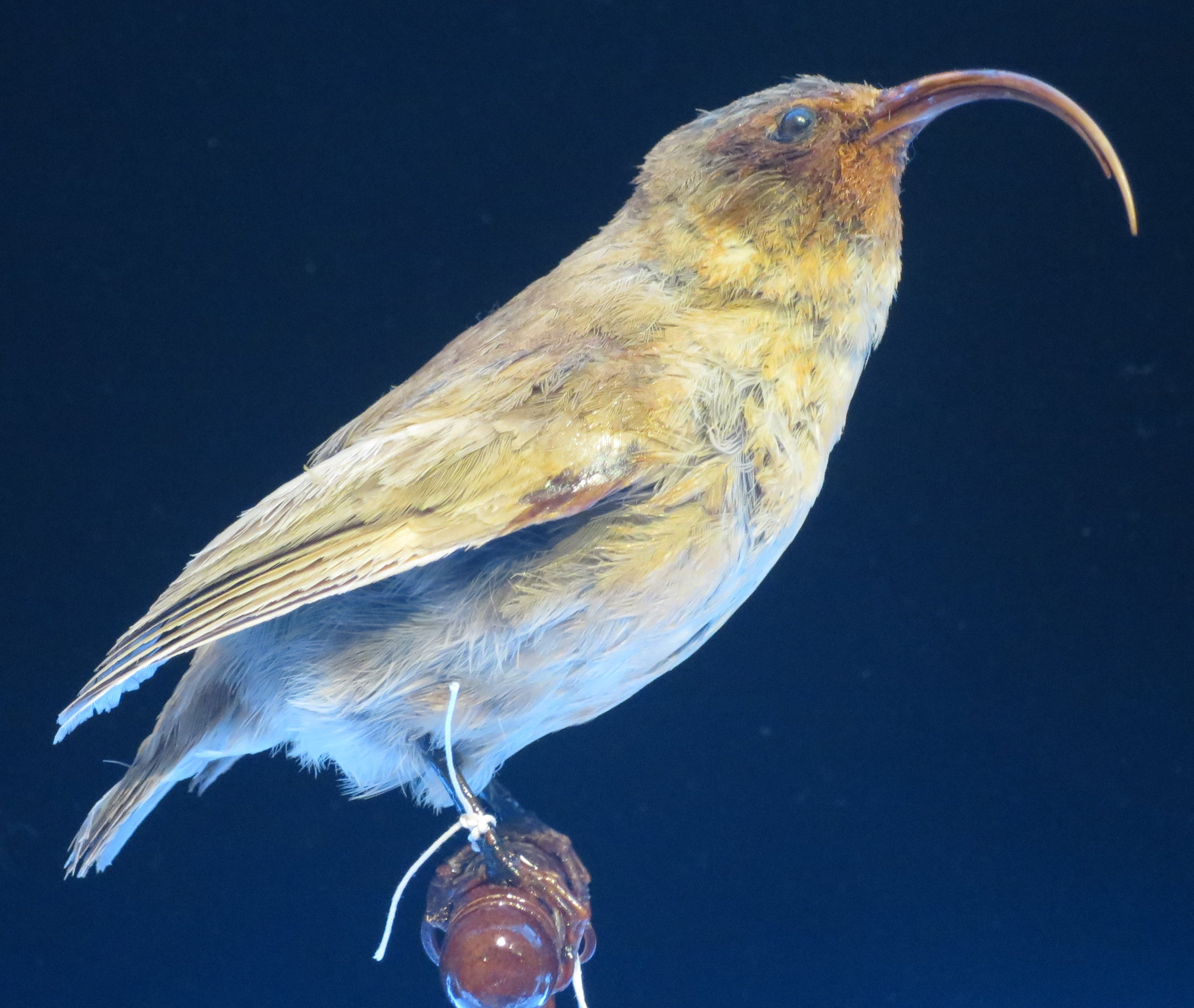
- Specimen

Conservation status
- Extinct (1940) (IUCN 3.1)

- Presumed Extinct (1940) (NatureServe)

Scientific classification
- Kingdom: Animalia
- Phylum: Chordata
- Class: Aves
- Order: Passeriformes
- Family: Fringillidae
- Subfamily: Carduelinae
- Genus: †Akialoa
- Species: †A. obscura

Binomial name
- †Akialoa obscura (JF Gmelin, 1788)

Synonyms
- Hemignathus obscurus

= Lesser ʻakialoa =

Extinct species of bird

The lesser ʻakialoa (Akialoa obscura) is an extinct species of Hawaiian honeycreeper in the subfamily Carduelinae of the family Fringillidae. It was endemic to the island of Hawaiʻi. It became extinct due to habitat loss and disappeared at around the same time as its Oʻahu relative.

== Description ==
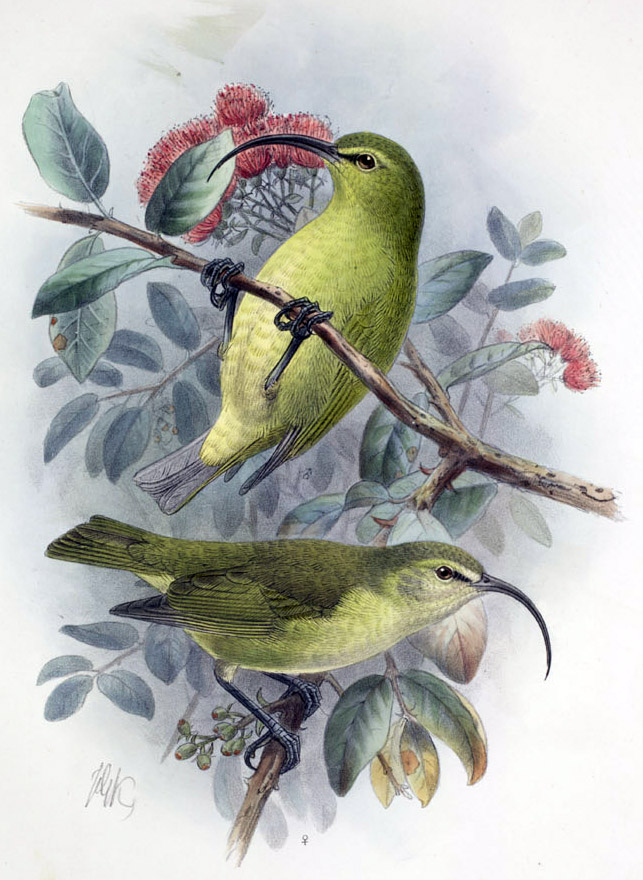
Illustration

It was a yellowish bird with a two-inch-long thin whitish-yellow bill. It had small olive green wings which it used to flit from tree to tree to look for insects like beetles and caterpillars.

== Behavior ==
It was seen gleaning the trees in search of insects. The bill of the ʻakialoa was also designed for more than bug extraction. The ʻakialoa also fed on nectar in the flowers of lobeliads and lehua blossoms. Its long bill could easily fit into petals of long flowers and took pollen from flower to flower on its forehead. It was collected at several places. It was once thought to be the same species as the Maui and Oʻahu form, but when specimens were compared all together the scientist saw that all three were different species.

== Extinction ==
A combination of deforestation and introduced disease carrying mosquitoes caused massive population decline which later led to the extinction of the ʻakialoa in 1940.
