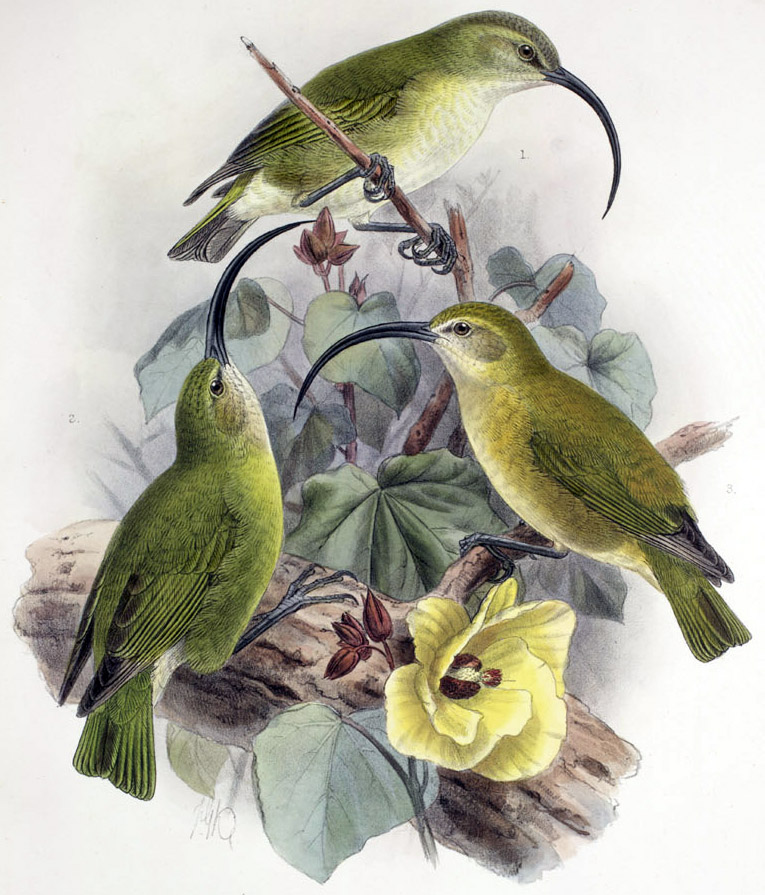
- Illustration by John Gerrard Keulemans

Conservation status
- Extinct (IUCN 3.1)

Scientific classification
- Kingdom: Animalia
- Phylum: Chordata
- Class: Aves
- Order: Passeriformes
- Family: Fringillidae
- Subfamily: Carduelinae
- Genus: †Akialoa
- Species: †A. lanaiensis

Binomial name
- †Akialoa lanaiensis (Rothschild, 1893)

Synonyms
- Hemignathus ellisiana lanaiensis

= Maui Nui ʻakialoa =

Extinct species of bird

The Maui Nui ʻakialoa or Lānaʻi ʻakialoa (Akialoa lanaiensis) is an extinct species of Hawaiian honeycreeper in the subfamily Carduelinae of the family Fringillidae. It inhabited the islands of Maui, Lānaʻi, and Molokaʻi in Hawaii.

== Description and habitat ==
The Maui Nui ʻakialoa was a grayish-yellow bird. It was six inches long, with a bill that was an inch and a half in length. It used its long bill to probe bark in search of insects and probe flowers in search of nectar.

It is known from three specimens collected on the island of Lānaʻi in 1892. It is also known from fossils on Molokaʻi and Maui. It lived in forests above 200 m of elevation.

== Extinction ==
The Maui Nui ʻakialoa was driven to extinction by habitat destruction and disease. Invasive species may also have been a factor.
