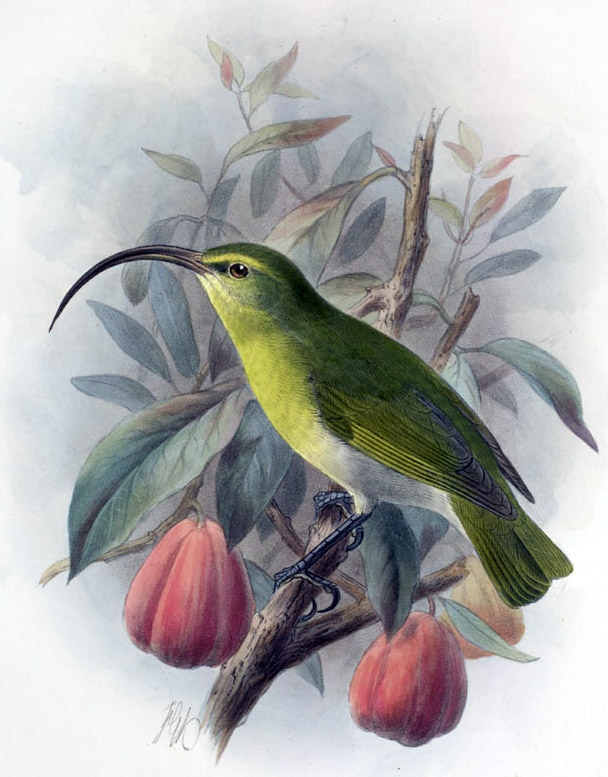

Conservation status
- Extinct (1892) (IUCN 3.1)

- Presumed Extinct (1892) (NatureServe)

Scientific classification
- Kingdom: Animalia
- Phylum: Chordata
- Class: Aves
- Order: Passeriformes
- Family: Fringillidae
- Subfamily: Carduelinae
- Genus: †Akialoa
- Species: †A. ellisiana

Binomial name
- †Akialoa ellisiana (G.R. Gray, 1860)

Synonyms
- Hemignathus ellisianus ellisianus

= Oʻahu ʻakialoa =

Extinct species of bird

The Oʻahu ʻakialoa (Akialoa ellisiana) is an extinct species of Hawaiian honeycreeper in the subfamily Carduelinae of the family Fringillidae. It was endemic to the island of Oʻahu in Hawaii.

== Description ==
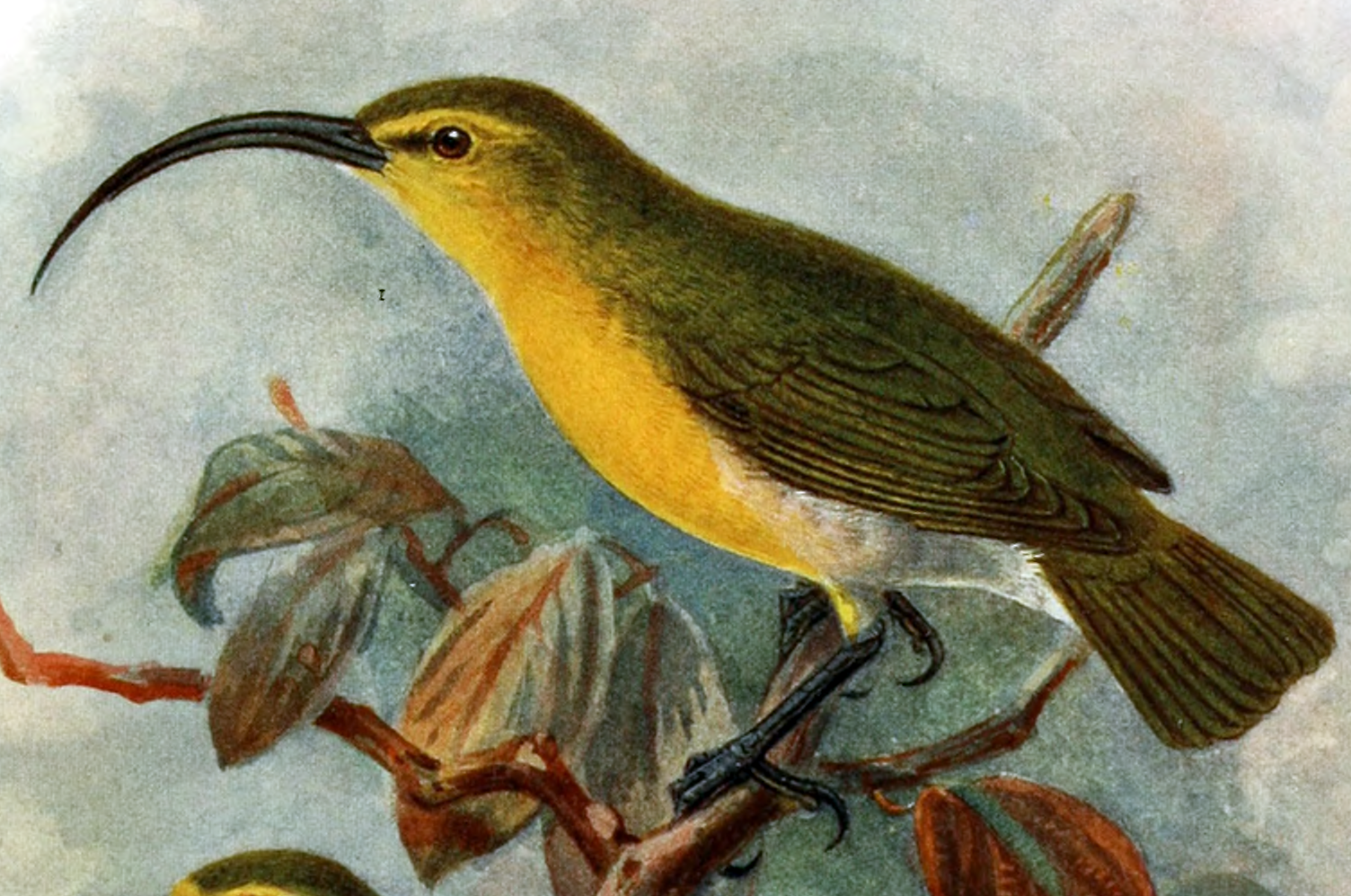
Akialoa ellisiana

The bird was a long-billed insectivorous bird that was found in the high elevation forest. It was a dull colored species, dull green on the belly, bright green on rump and tail, dark olive-gray back and speckled yellow and green on the head. It was mainly an insectivore, using its bill to probe through the bark in search of arthropods, also using its long bill to probe flowers for nectar.

== Status ==
Since the population was already taking a toll due to the large amount of deforestation, it was susceptible to the avian influenza, more commonly known as the bird flu. This was brought in by mosquitoes who were carrying the virus and were able to spread it within the community. Because of the virus, the population fell to around 4–6 percent of its normal population (Pratt). Scientists were sure that this bird was still common in the 1860s, according to evidence found by Perkins. Afterward, few reports came in, though two were presumed to be seen in 1933 and one in 1940.
