= Max Schlemmer =

German-Hawaiian businessman (1856–1935)

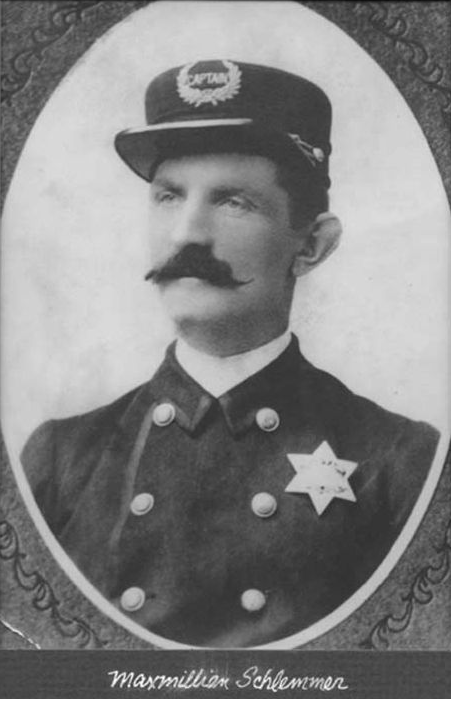
- Schlemmer as captain in the Honolulu Police force, c. 1893
- Born: April 13, 1856; Scheibenhardt, German Confederation
- Died: June 13, 1935 (aged 79); Honolulu, Territory of Hawaii
- Occupation: Superintendent of a guano mining operation
- Known for: Introduced rabbits to Laysan, leading to the extinction of the Laysan rail and Laysan millerbird and permanently changing the island's ecology in the early 20th century

Maximilian Joseph August Schlemmer (April 13, 1856 – June 13, 1935), known as the "King of Laysan," was a German immigrant to the United States who settled in Hawaii and spent fifteen years from 1894 to 1915 living with his family on the Hawaiian island of Laysan as superintendent of a guano mining operation. Schlemmer was interested in the birdlife of the island and made several studies which provide information on historic bird populations. However, Schlemmer and his family introduced rabbits to Laysan, leading to the extinction of the Laysan rail and Laysan millerbird and permanently changing the island's ecology in the early 20th century. A biography of Schlemmer was written by his grandson, Tom Unger.

== Early life ==
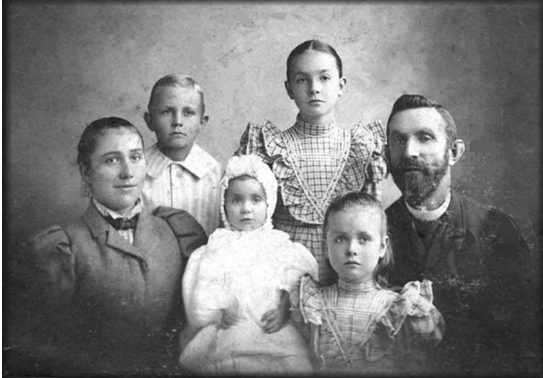
The Schlemmer family in 1898

Schlemmer was born in 1856 to German parents living in Scheibenhardt, Alsace, on the border of Germany and France. He moved to New York in 1871 fearing the advance of the Prussian army into France and worked for several years aboard whaling ships before moving to Kauai in 1885 to live in a "German town" called Lihue. Schlemmer worked for some years at a sugar mill and applied his mechanical skills to a small railroad system for transporting material at the mill. He married Auguste Bomke on September 5, 1886 at the Lutheran church in Lihue. Auguste had three children (Marianne called Mary, Auguste called Gussie and Max Jr.) and after her death he married Auguste's younger sister, Therese, on March 22, 1895. Therese had several more children with him. In 1893 Schlemmer served in the Honolulu Police, assisting the government of Queen Liliuoakalani prevent a coup by Americans. The coup however was successful and the Republic of Hawaii was created. Schlemmer then obtained a job in the Pacific Guano & Fertilizer Company working for the Japanese under a Captain (“Governor”) Charles N. Spencer which extracted nitrate from the guano obtained from islands where birds nested in large numbers, particularly Laysan Island. In six years Schlemmer was able to turn around the company into a major profit. In 1899 Schlemmer left Laysan, with a falling out with Spencer and returned to Hawaii to obtain an American citizenship. In 1900, unrest broke out on Laysan and the Pacific Guano & Fertilizer Company people decided that Schlemmer's role in smooth operations was key and recruited him back to replace Spencer. Schlemmer was posted manager and his family, and two workers moved to Laysan and were the sole white residents, the remainder being Japanese labourers, leading to the jocular epithet of "King of Laysan." They continued to mine guano even after the company that he worked for moved out their operations.

== "King of Laysan" ==
Schlemmer was made superintendent of the guano operation in 1896. Soon after, he left to open a bar and boardinghouse on Kauai during which time a Japanese miner on Laysan was murdered during a dispute between American and Japanese workers. In the ensuing court case, the existing superintendent was removed and Schlemmer returned to Laysan again. The North Pacific Phosphate and Fertilizer Company sold their mining rights to Schlemmer, and he in turn sold them to a Genkichi Yamanouchi of Tokyo, allowing him to export anything from Laysan. Yamanouchi used this permission to export not guano, which had been mostly depleted, but bird feathers. Max Schlemmer hired Japanese workers, and together they slaughtered over 300,000 birds. They were starved, had their wings removed, tossed aside on the beach, and slowly baked and died in the sun.

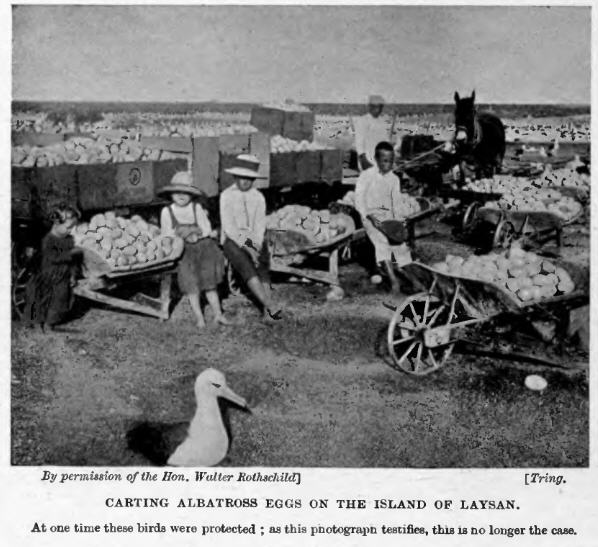
Photo of eggs being harvested. The girl in hat is Ottilie, Schlemmer's daughter.

With the creation of the bird reservation in 1909, however, these activities became illegal, and Schlemmer was removed from the island. The rabbits that he had previously let loose now became uncontrolled and ravaged the island for food. The US Biological Survey sent a crew to exterminate them in 1913, but ran out of ammunition after 5,000 were killed, leaving a substantial number still alive. Schlemmer was unable to live away from Laysan, and in 1915 the government allowed him to return while denying his request to become a federal game warden. With nothing to eat on the bare island, Schlemmer's family nearly starved before they were rescued by the USS Nereus. With World War I having broken out and the subsequent anti-German paranoia, Schlemmer found himself accused of being a German spy using Laysan as his headquarters.

== Repercussions of the rabbit introduction ==
Schlemmer released domestic rabbits, guinea pigs, and perhaps hares on Laysan Island, expecting them to multiply and provide supplies for a future meat-canning business. The rabbits denuded the island of most of its vegetation, which provided habitat and food for many of the local animals. Many species consequently became extinct in the early 1920s, including the Laysan rail (which survived on other islands for a while), the Laysan millerbird, and the Laysan fan palm. The Laysan finch was able to survive by scavenging other dead birds, and the Laysan duck survived because its diet of brine flies was unharmed.

== See also ==
- Tanager Expedition
