= Laysan dropseed noctuid moth =

Conservation status
- Extinct (IUCN 2.3)

Scientific classification
- Kingdom: Animalia
- Phylum: Arthropoda
- Class: Insecta
- Order: Lepidoptera
- Superfamily: Noctuoidea
- Family: Erebidae
- Genus: Hypena
- Species: †H. laysanensis

Binomial name
- †Hypena laysanensis (Swezey, 1914)

Synonyms
- Nesamiptis laysanensis Swezey, 1914

Extinct species of moth

The Laysan dropseed noctuid moth (Hypena laysanensis) was a species of moth in the family Erebidae. The species was first described by Otto Herman Swezey in 1914. This species is now extinct.

This moth was endemic to Laysan Island, one of the outlying Hawaiian Islands of the United States.

The larvae have been recorded on Sporobolus species.
