= Oedemasylus =

Scientific classification
- Kingdom: Animalia
- Phylum: Arthropoda
- Class: Insecta
- Order: Coleoptera
- Suborder: Polyphaga
- Infraorder: Cucujiformia
- Family: Curculionidae
- Subfamily: Entiminae
- Genus: Oedemasylus

Genus of beetles

Oedemasylus is a genus of beetle in family Curculionidae. It contains the following species:

- Oedemasylus laysanensis (extinct)
