= Maro Reef =

Largely submerged coral atoll in the Hawaiian Islands

Coordinates: 25.415°N 170.590°W

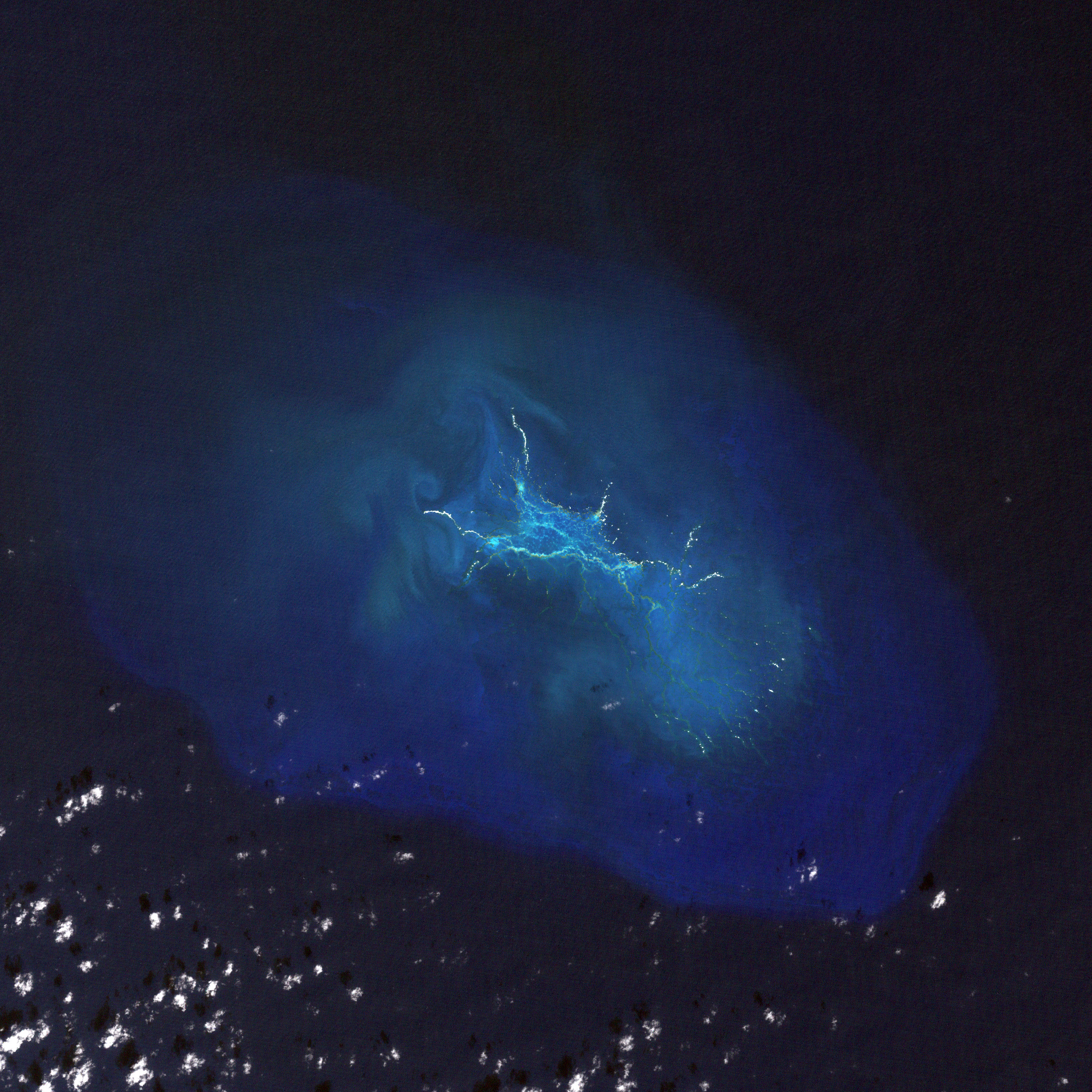
Satellite image of Maro Reef

Maro Reef (Hawaiian: Nalukākala - "surf that arrives in combers") is a largely submerged coral atoll located in the Northwestern Hawaiian Islands. It was discovered in 1820 by Captain Joseph Allen of the ship Maro, after whose ship the reef was named. With a total area of 747 square miles (1,935 km^{2}), it is the largest coral reef in the Northwestern Hawaiian Islands. It contains 37 species of stony coral. Unlike most atolls, the coral extends out from the center like spokes on a wheel. Located about 850 miles (740 nmi; 1,370 km) northwest of Honolulu, Hawaii, Maro Reef contains about 1 acre (4,000 m^{2}) of dry land which itself can be submerged depending on the tides. Some scientists believe that it "may be on the verge of drowning" because the reefs are detached and are vulnerable to strong storm waves.

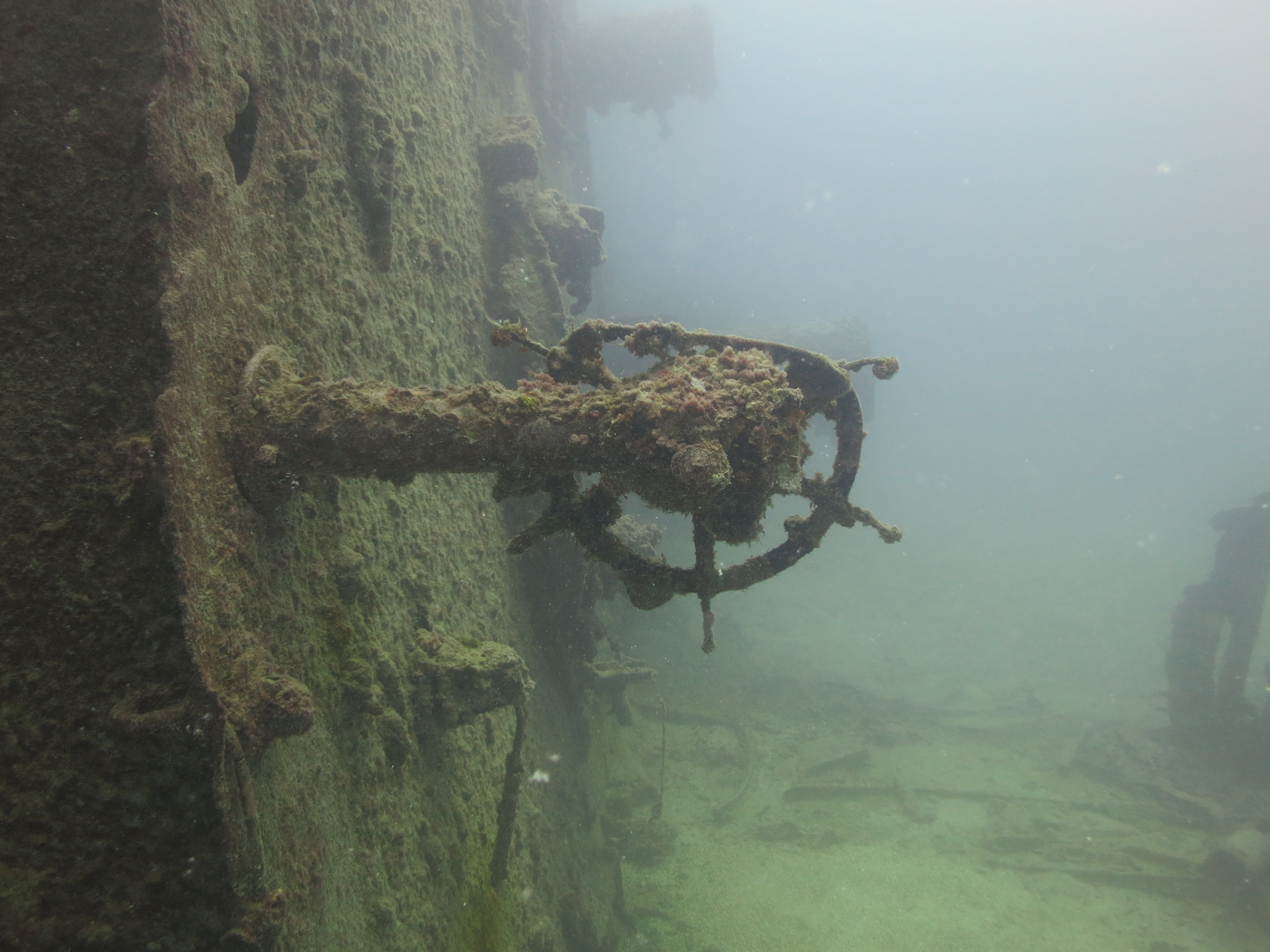
Wreck of the USNS ship Mission San Miguel. All hands were evacuated before it sank in 1957. It was rediscovered in 2015.

USNS Mission San Miguel (T-AO-129) ran aground on the reef, while running at full speed and in ballast, and sank on October 8, 1957.

The ship was a Buenaventura class tanker built in WW2, and due to problems with LORAN reception (for navigation) miscalculated its location striking Maro reef. It was rediscovered in 2015 by NOAA divers. At 523 feet long it is the largest ship lost on Maro reef and noted for historical significant as WW2 T2 tank vessel.

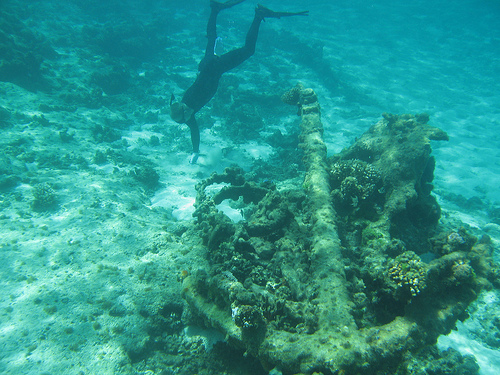
USCG image of an abandoned anchor in Maro Reef

== Dowsett Reef ==
Dowsett Reef (also called Dowsett's Rock) is to the south of Maro Reef. The sailing ship McNear, a bark, sunk on Dowsett Reef on May 14, 1900. The ship's 33 occupants survived by sailing in boats to Laysan.

== See also ==
- List of reefs
- List of volcanoes in the Hawaiian – Emperor seamount chain
