= Northwestern Hawaiian Islands =

Small islands and atolls in Hawaii

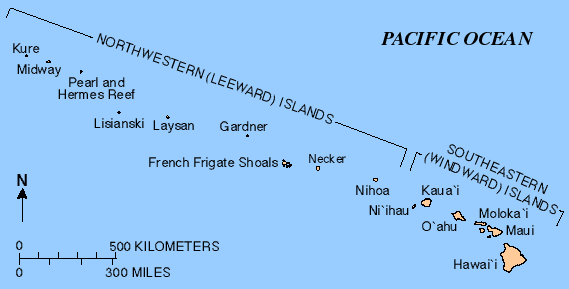
- The Northwestern Hawaiian Islands form part of the Hawaiian island chain

- Location of the Northwestern Hawaiian Islands in the Pacific Ocean NW Hawaiian Islands (Hawaiian Islands)

Geography
- Location: Pacific Ocean
- Coordinates: 25°N 168°W
- Archipelago: Hawaiian Islands
- Adjacent to: Pacific Ocean

Administration
- United States
- State/Territory: Hawaii and Midway Island

The Northwestern Hawaiian Islands, also known as the Leeward Hawaiian Islands, are a series of mostly uninhabited islands and atolls located northwest of Kauai and Niʻihau in the Hawaiian island chain. Politically, these islands are part of Honolulu County in the U.S. state of Hawaii, with the exception of Midway Atoll, though they are generally not included on maps and graphic depictions of the State of Hawaii. Midway Atoll is a territory distinct from the State of Hawaii, and is classified as one of the United States Minor Outlying Islands. The United States Census Bureau designates this area, excluding Midway Atoll, as Census Tract 114.98 of Honolulu County. The total land area of these islands is 3.1075 square miles (8.048 km²). With the exception of Nīhoa, all of the islands lie north of the Tropic of Cancer, making them the only islands in Hawaii situated outside the tropics.

Almost all of the islands are uninhabited, the main exception being Midway Atoll, which maintains a permanent rotating population of U.S. Fish and Wildlife Service staff and other workers. Kure Atoll and Tern Island have a seasonal population of a small team of environmental staff. At least some of the islands were visited by Ancient Hawaiians, with Nīhoa showing evidence of permanent habitation.

The Northwestern Hawaiian Islands are part of the Papahānaumokuākea Marine National Monument, a globally significant marine conservation area. They are home to endangered species like the Hawaiian monk seal and green sea turtle and hold cultural importance for Native Hawaiians. Geologically, they are the oldest in the Hawaiian-Emperor seamount chain, shaped by volcanic activity and erosion over millions of years.

The Northwestern or Leeward Hawaiian Islands include

- Nīhoa (Moku Manu) at 23°03′38″N 161°55′19″W
- Necker (Mokumanamana) at 23°34′30″N 164°42′01″W
- French Frigate Shoals (Kānemilohaʻi) (Lalo) at 23°52′12″N 166°17′06″W
- Gardner Pinnacles (Pūhāhonu) (ʻŌnūnui and/or ʻŌnūiki) at 24°59′57″N 167°59′56″W
- Maro Reef (Nalukākala) (Koʻanakoʻa) (Kamokuokamohoaliʻi) at 25°26′15″N 170°35′24″W
- Laysan (Kauō) (Kamole) at 25°46′12″N 171°44′06″W
- Lisianski (Papaʻāpoho) (Kapou) at 26°03′45″N 173°57′54″W
- Pearl and Hermes Atoll (Holoikauaua) (Manawai) at 27°47′24″N 175°49′12″W
- Midway Atoll (Pihemanu) (Kuaihelani) at 28°12′27″N 177°21′00″W – not part of the State of Hawaii
- Kure Atoll (Mokupāpapa) (Hōlanikū) at 28°23′24″N 178°17′42″W

== The islands ==
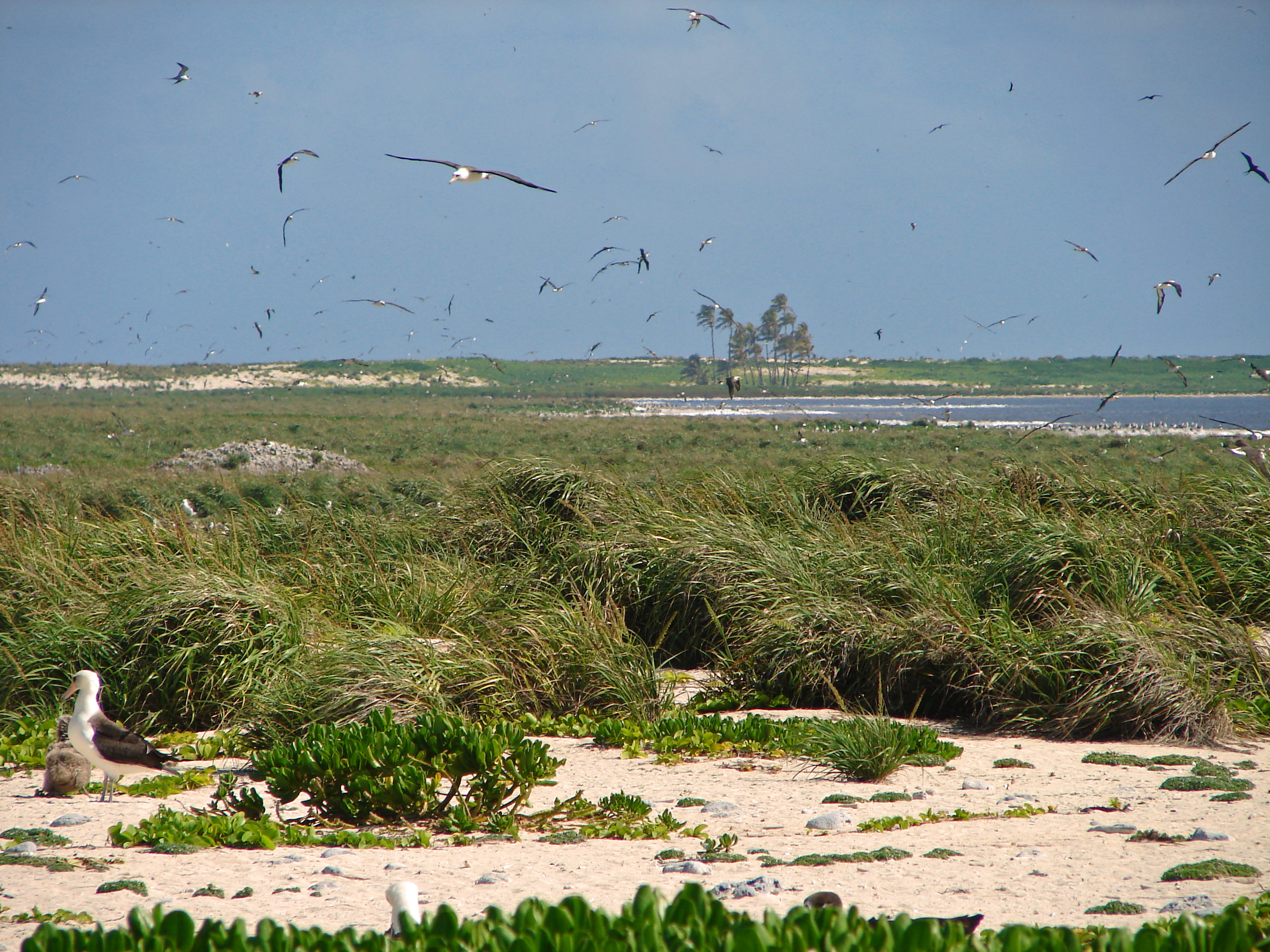
The interior of Laysan, showing the hypersaline lake

- 156-acre (0.63 km^{2}) Nīhoa is the youngest of the NWHI, and the tallest, with 900-foot (270 m) vertical cliffs. It is the southwestern remnant of the island's former volcanic cone. Ancient Hawaiians might have stayed here long-term.
- 40-acre (160,000 m^{2}) Necker Island is hook-shaped and 270 feet (82 m) tall at its summit. Barren of vegetation, it was used by Ancient Hawaiians for religious purposes, but not for long-term habitation.
- French Frigate Shoals is an atoll, the largest region of coral reefs in Hawaii, at 200 square miles (520 km^{2}). The atoll is composed of a dozen or so small islands, one of which (Tern Island) contains an airport and human habitations.
- Gardner Pinnacles is made up of two small basalt peaks, the last rocky island in Hawaii. While the island itself is tiny, the surrounding reef is expansive and diverse.
- 166-square-mile (430 km^{2}) Maro Reef is an extremely fertile reef system that has been described as a "coral garden".
- Laysan is a 913-acre (3.69 km^{2}), low, sandy island with a natural lake in its interior, one of only five such lakes in Hawaii. It has arguably the most diverse ecosystem in the NWHI, and hosts about two million seabirds of seventeen species.
- Lisianski Island, only 400 acres (1.6 km^{2}), is geologically akin to Laysan, without the lake. Though the island is slightly less biodiverse, the surrounding reef is very fertile.
- Pearl and Hermes Atoll is an atoll very similar to French Frigate Shoals, but with much less dry land. For this reason, it was mostly ignored by guano miners and feather hunters.
- Midway Atoll is the most commonly known of the NWHI, and is also the largest. The Battle of Midway was fought here and in its surrounding waters, and the island remains permanently inhabited, albeit by persons who are there in consequence of their service with the United States Government, not an indigenous population.
- Circular Kure Atoll contains the 236-acre (0.96 km^{2}) Green Island, which used to host a LORAN station and a runway, but these have since been decommissioned. Kure is one of the less biodiverse islands of the NWHI.

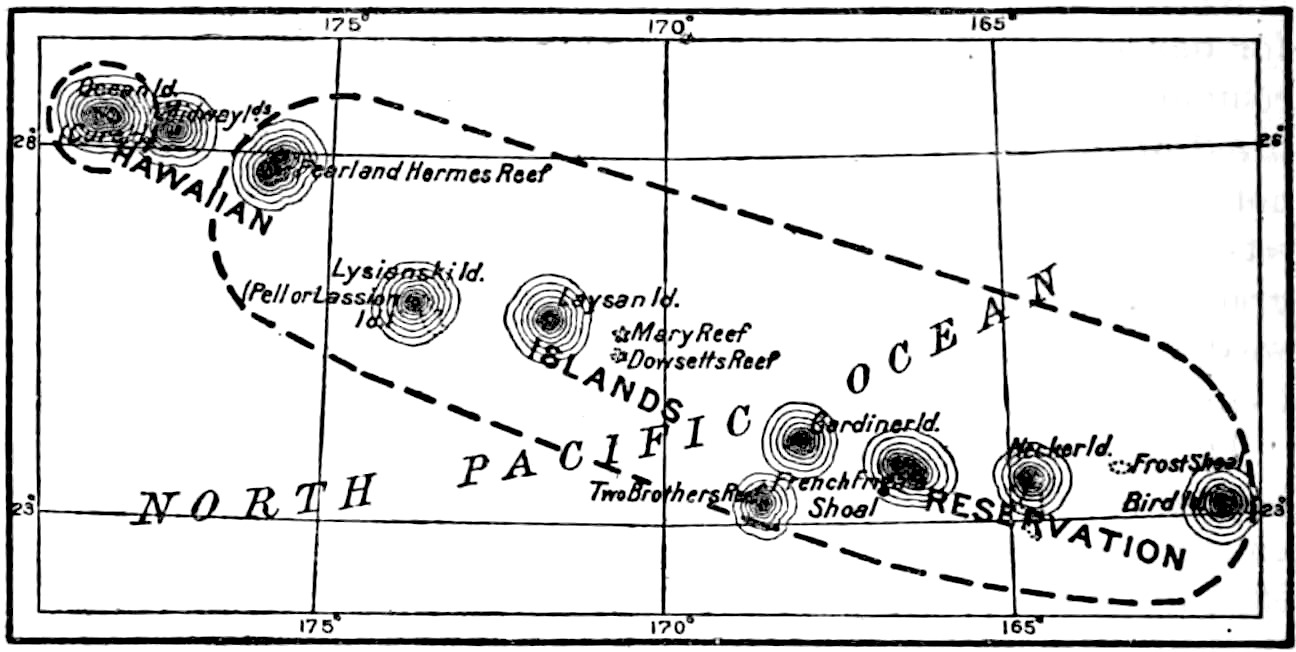
1909 map of the Hawaiian Islands Reservation.

Other islands or reefs were previously mapped as part of this chain but are now considered to be either phantom islands or misidentifications of existing islands. The following reefs continued to appear on maps as late as 1934:

- Two Brothers Reef, site of the 1823 Two Brothers shipwreck, originally placed west of French Frigate Shoals but later proven to be identical with the latter.
- "Krusenstern Reef," "Krusenstern Rock," or "Krusenstern Island" was a phantom reef at 22°15′N 175°37′W, south of Lisianski Island; an investigation in 1923 declared it nonexistent.

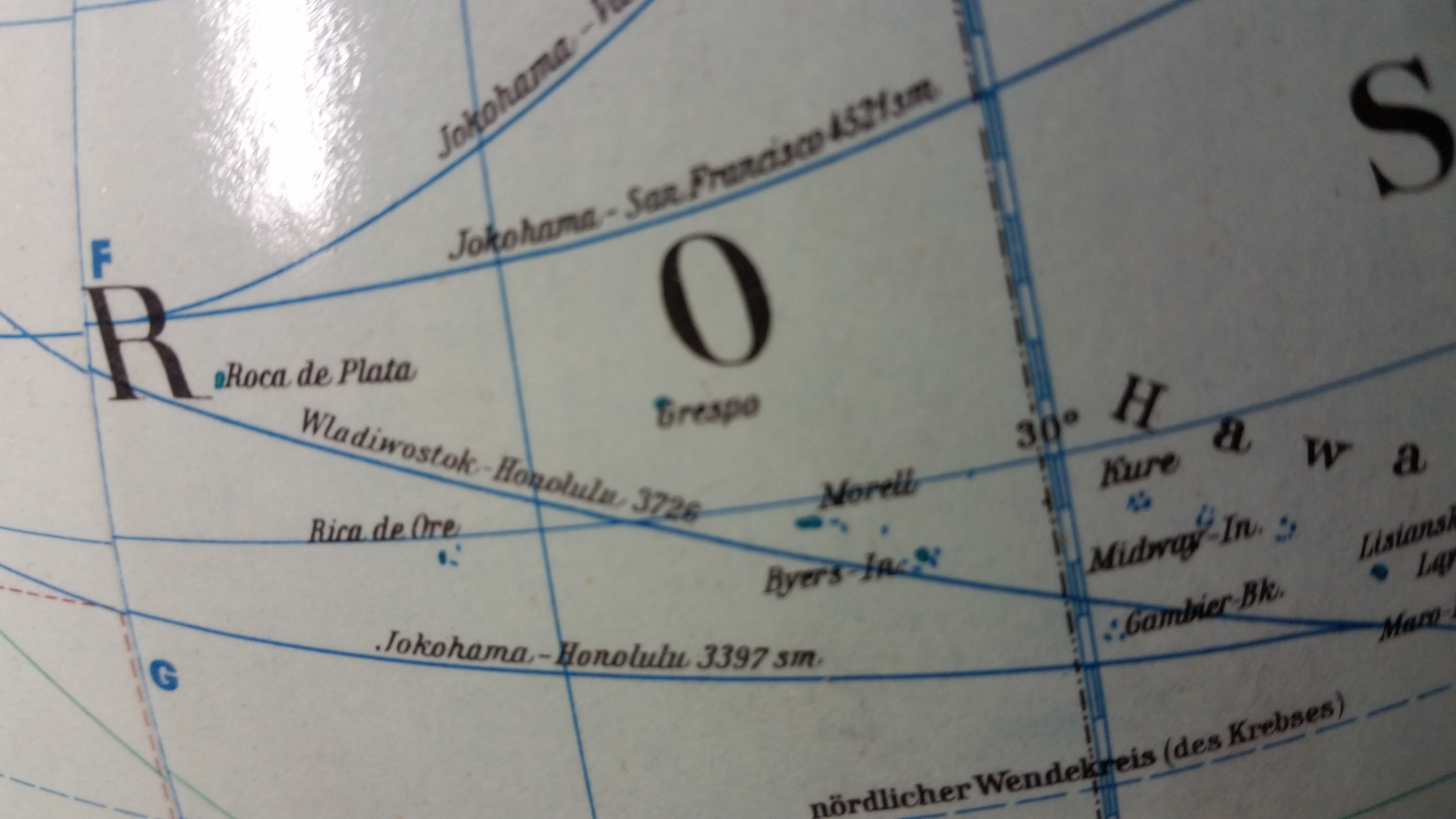
JRO globe ca. 1960

As late as 1960, a German globe showed islands west of Kure Atoll that had long been proven nonexistent:

- Byers's Island
- Morrell's Island

== Geology ==
The Northwestern Hawaiian Islands were formed approximately 7 to 30 million years ago, as shield volcanoes over the same volcanic hotspot that formed the Emperor Seamounts to the north and the Main Hawaiian Islands to the south. As the Pacific Plate moved north and later northwest over the hot spot, volcanic eruptions built up islands in a linear chain. The isolated land masses gradually eroded and subsided, evolving from high islands in the south, much like the Main Islands of Hawaii, to atolls (or seamounts) north of the Darwin Point. Each of the NWHI are in various stages of erosion. Nīhoa, Necker, and Gardner Pinnacles are rocky, basalt islands that have not eroded enough to form an atoll, or that lack a substantial coral reef. Laysan and Lisianski are low, sandy islands that have been eroded longer. French Frigate Shoals, Pearl and Hermes, Midway, and Kure are atolls.

North of the Darwin Point, the coral reef grows more slowly than the island's subsidence, and as the Pacific Plate moves northwest, the island becomes a seamount when it crosses this line. Kure Atoll straddles the Darwin Point, and will sink beneath the ocean when its coral reef cannot keep up with the rate of subsidence, a destiny that awaits every Hawaiian island.

== Biodiversity and endemism ==
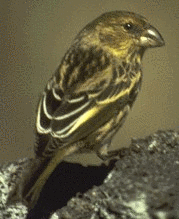
The Nīhoa finch

The Hawaiian Islands are about 2,500 miles (4,000 km) from North America and 3,800 miles (6,100 km) from Asia, and it is because of this isolation that the Hawaiian Islands have extraordinary numbers of unique species. Only a species that could fly or swim immense distances could reach the archipelago. But whereas Polynesians, and later, Europeans, have largely altered the ecosystem of the Main Hawaiian islands by introducing alien species, the ecosystems of the NWHI remain, for the most part, intact. The extensive coral reefs found in Papahānaumokuākea are home to over 7,000 marine species. Of the many species that live here, over 1,700 species of organisms are endemic to the Hawaiian Islands (i.e., they are found nowhere else). For this reason, the region has been dubbed "America's Galápagos".

Though not subject to nearly as much extinction as the main islands, the Leeward Islands have had their share of abuse. From the late 19th to the early 20th centuries, fishermen, guano miners, and feather hunters killed most of the birds and sea life living in the NWHI. Rabbits were introduced to Laysan and Lisianski, where they multiplied and devoured most of the vegetation, permanently extinguishing several species. However, most of the damage was reversed, and the islands were restored largely to their pre-exploitation state.

=== Important Bird Area ===
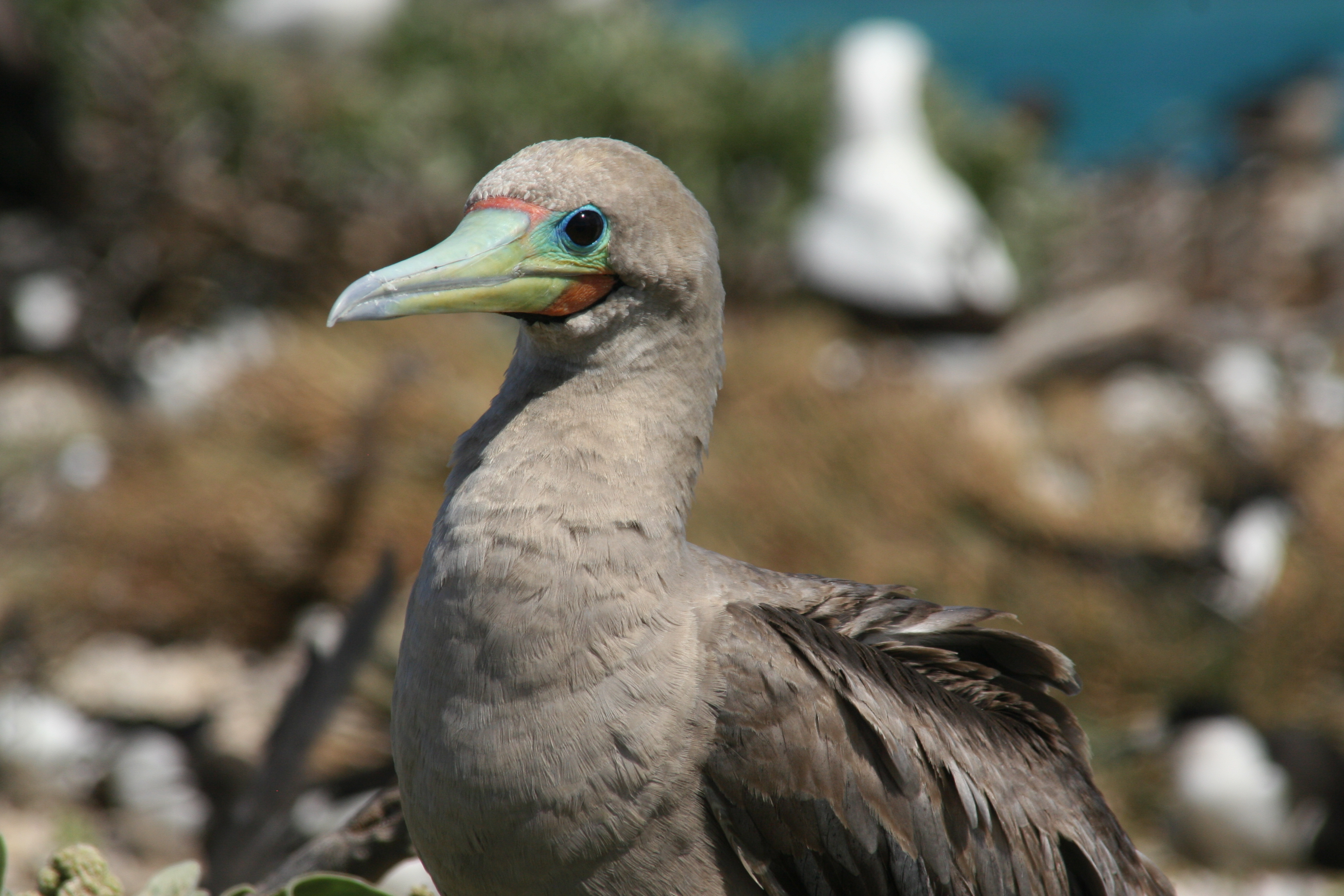
Bird on Tern Island, French Frigate Shoals

The NWHI has been recognized as an Important Bird Area (IBA) by BirdLife International because of its seabirds and endemic landbirds. The seabird colonies in the IBA form one of the largest assemblages of tropical seabirds in the world, with over 14 million birds of 21 species.

Some of the endemic species of the NWHI include the Nīhoa and Laysan finch, the Laysan duck (the "rarest native waterfowl in the United States"), and the Nīhoa fan palm. Other notable species are the Laysan albatross, the highly endangered Hawaiian monk seal, and the green sea turtle. The only native trapdoor spiders in the Hawaiian archipelago (Nihoa spp.), recently discovered, are found here. Most endemic species are highly vulnerable to extinction as one major catastrophic event could wipe out all of the vegetation on each small island. Additionally, seventy percent of all coral reefs in the United States are found here.

== Climate ==
The Northwestern Hawaiian Islands have a dry-summer tropical savannah climate, As in the Köppen climate classification system. In the driest month (May), they receive less than 60 mm (2.4 in) of precipitation and also less than $100-\left (\frac{\mathrm{total\,annual\,precipitation\,(mm)}}{25} \right)$ mm of precipitation. These are the absolute and relative thresholds separating a tropical savanna climate from a tropical monsoon or rainforest climate.

Because of their small size, rainfall and temperature are more consistent across and within these islands than in the larger Windward Islands (the main islands) of Hawaii. The sea swell is much larger in the winter. Total precipitation averages about 500 to 750 millimeters (20 to 30 inches) per year.

Climate data for Northwestern Hawaiian Islands Marine National Monument
Month	Jan	Feb	Mar	Apr	May	Jun	Jul	Aug	Sep	Oct	Nov	Dec	Year
Mean daily maximum °F (°C)	74 (23)	73 (23)	73 (23)	76 (24)	78 (26)	82 (28)	85 (29)	86 (30)	85 (29)	82 (28)	79 (26)	75 (24)	79.9 (26.6)
Daily mean °F (°C)	70 (21)	69 (21)	69.5 (20.8)	72 (22)	74 (23)	78.5 (25.8)	81 (27)	82 (28)	81 (27)	78.5 (25.8)	75 (24)	71 (22)	75.5 (24.2)
Mean daily minimum °F (°C)	66 (19)	65 (18)	66 (19)	68 (20)	70 (21)	75 (24)	77 (25)	78 (26)	77 (25)	75 (24)	71 (22)	67 (19)	71.3 (21.8)
Average rainfall inches (mm)	2.52 (64)	2.22 (56)	1.64 (42)	1.10 (28)	0.91 (23)	1.19 (30)	1.72 (44)	1.74 (44)	2.53 (64)	1.97 (50)	2.62 (67)	2.52 (64)	22.68 (576)
Average rainy days	11	9	9	7	6	6	8	8	9	8	10	11	102
Average relative humidity (%)	76	75	75	75	75	77	77	76	76	76	76	76	75.8
Source: Time and Date

== Exploration ==
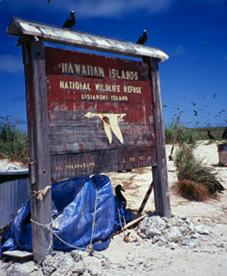
The reserve sign on Lisianski

Archeological evidence suggests ancient Hawaiians visited but did not live on Mokumanamana (Necker) and French Frigate Shoals, and the islands were deserted when Europeans arrived in the 18th century. Agricultural terraces indicate Hawaiians lived on Nīhoa for extended periods of time. Mokumanamana lacks vegetation and is unsuitable for agriculture, and archeological studies indicate early Hawaiians only visited and used the island for religious purposes.

The first of the Leeward Isles to be discovered by Europeans was Nīhoa. James Colnett discovered it in 1786, although historically the credit has gone to William Douglas. Later that year, La Pérouse discovered Necker, and named it for Jacques Necker, the French Minister of Finance. La Pérouse then went on to discover French Frigate Shoals. The last of the NWHI to be discovered was Midway Atoll, which was found by N.C. Middlebrooks in 1859. In 1925, the Tanager Expedition travelled to many of the NWHI. The islands were mapped, new species were discovered and described, and the archeological sites on Nīhoa and Necker were found.

=== Naming system ===
Most of the islands have several names: one in English and one or more in Hawaiian (indicated in parentheses above). The majority of the Hawaiian names used as alternatives to the English ones were created in modern times; the original names that ancient Hawaiians gave to all of these islands that they encountered prior to Western contact are found in various oli (chants) and moʻolelo (stories).

== National Monument ==
On June 15, 2006, American President George W. Bush issued a public proclamation creating Papahānaumokuākea Marine National Monument under the Antiquities Act of 1906. The Monument encompasses the islands and surrounding waters, forming the largest marine wildlife reserve in the world. President Theodore Roosevelt had declared the Northwestern Hawaiian chain a bird sanctuary in 1909, and the islands had been protected since 2000 with a designation as an 'ecosystem reserve' by President Bill Clinton, but increasing it to national monument status provides unprecedented control. 139,000 square miles (360,000 km^{2}) of ocean was at that time set aside for protection, about the size of the U.S. state of California.

In August 2016, President Barack Obama expanded the area of the monument by roughly four times. The expanded monument was at that time the world's largest marine protected area.

Entry to the Monument is limited through a permit system, jointly administered by NOAA, FWS, and the state of Hawaii. Anyone who comes to the islands must follow stringent procedures designed to prevent any stray species from entering and disrupting the ecosystem. All clothes must be bought new, and kept wrapped until before arrival. In fact, all "soft" items (camera strap, blanket) must be bought new, and all "hard" items (camera, binoculars) must be cleaned thoroughly. Then, every item must be frozen for 48 hours. A new set of equipment must be prepared for each island one is going to, to prevent inter-island species introduction. However, French Frigate Shoals and Midway Atoll are exempted from these rules, as they are deemed too altered by humans already to worry about introducing new species.

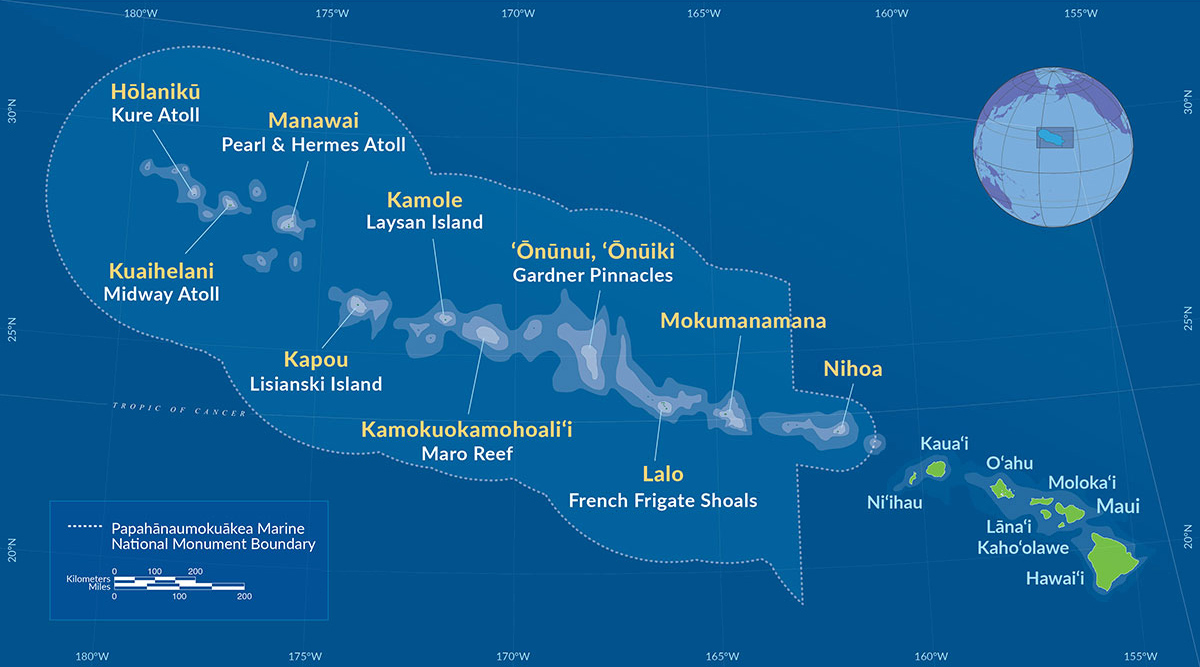
Papahānaumokuākea Marine National Monument

== See also ==
- Bibliography of Midway Atoll
- Hawaiian Islands National Wildlife Refuge
- National Register of Historic Places listings in Hawaii § Northwestern Hawaiian Islands
- Desert island
- List of islands
