= Laysan =

Atoll of Hawaii

Native name: Kauō
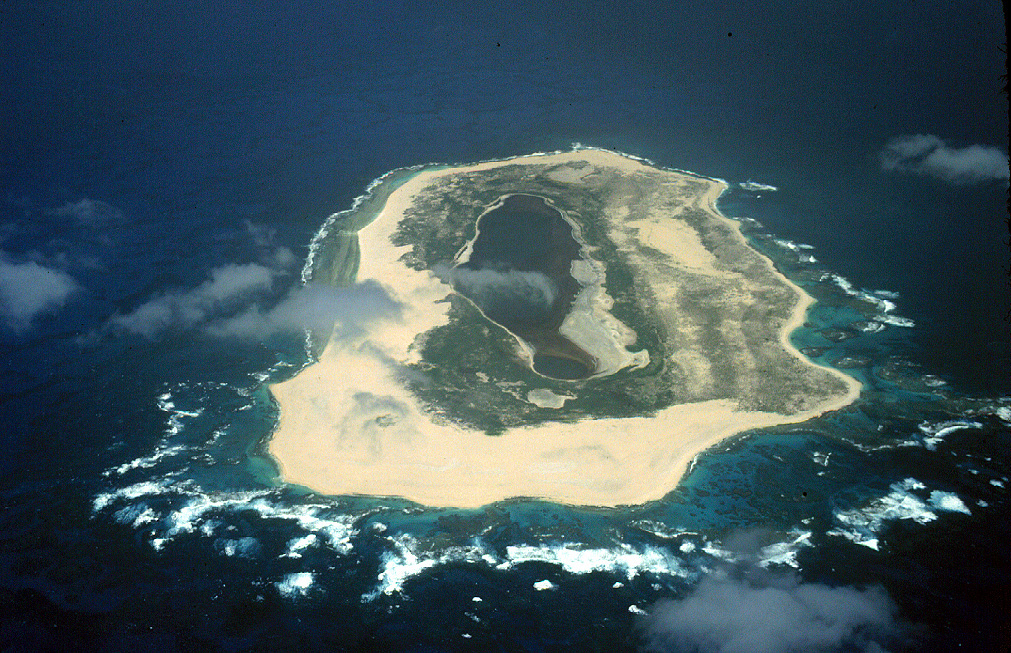
- Aerial view of Laysan from the north

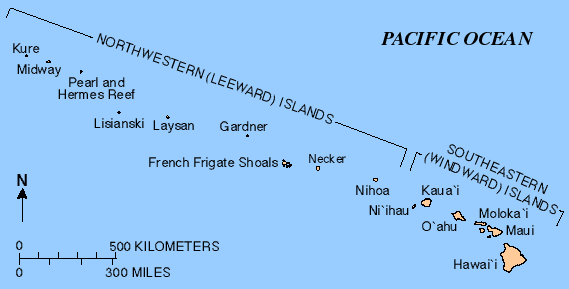
- Map of the Hawaiian Islands showing the location of Laysan, in the middle of the northwestern chain

- Location within Hawaiian Islands Location within Pacific Ocean

Geography
- Location: Pacific Ocean
- Coordinates: 25°46′12″N 171°44′15″W
- Archipelago: Northwestern Hawaiian Islands
- Area: 1,016 acres (411 ha)
- Length: 1.5 mi (2.4 km)
- Width: 1 mi (2 km)

Administration
- United States
- State: Hawaii
- County: Honolulu

Demographics
- Population: 0

Laysan (/ˈlaɪsɑːn/; Hawaiian: Kauō [kɐwˈoː]) is one of the Northwestern Hawaiian Islands, located 808 nautical miles (930 mi; 1,496 km) northwest of Honolulu. It has one land mass of 1,016 acres (411 ha), about 1 by 1 1/2 miles (1.6 by 2.4 km) in size. It is an atoll of sorts, although the land completely surrounds Laysan Lake, some 2.4 m (7.9 ft) above sea level, that has a salinity approximately three times greater than the ocean. Laysan's Hawaiian name, Kauō, means "egg".

It was mined for guano in the late 19th century and early 1900s, which resulted in the release of rabbits who had been brought in for food. After mining ceased, the rabbits ate up the natural vegetation causing dozens of plant and one bird species to go extinct. The rabbits were removed by 1923, and the island has been a nature reserve since. The island is the home of the rarest duck in the world, the Laysan Duck.

== Geology ==
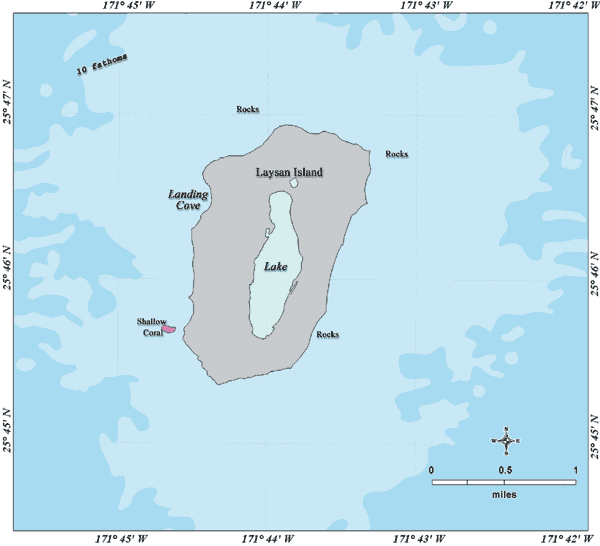
Bathymetric map of Laysan

Laysan is the second largest single landmass in the Northwestern Hawaiian Islands, after Sand Island at Midway Atoll. Laysan was created by coral growth and geologic upshift. The fringing reefs surrounding the island cover about 735 acres (297 ha). The tallest point on the island is 50 feet (15 m) above sea level, on a large dune that covers much of the northern portion of the island.

Lake Laysan, a 100-acre (40 ha), brown, hypersaline lake in the island's interior, has varied in depth over the decades. In the 1860s, the lake was at most 30 feet (9 m) deep, but by the 1920s it averaged only 3–5 feet (1–2 m) in depth, because of the build-up of sand that had been blown into it by sandstorms. The best way to find fresh water on Laysan is to observe where the finches are drinking, because fresh water floats on the saltier water and accumulates around the shore.

A U.S. Geological Survey study found that Laysan, Midway Atoll, and Pacific islands like them, could become inundated and unfit to live on during the 21st century.

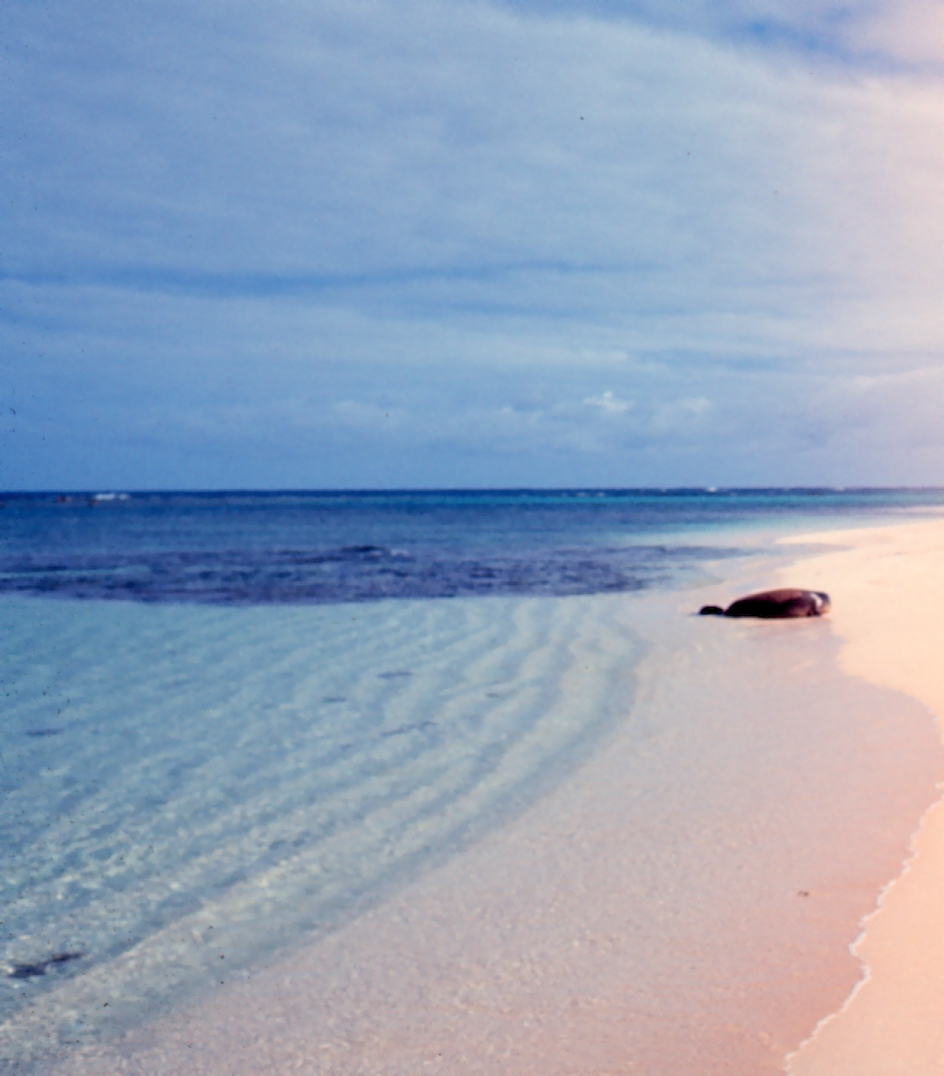
Monk seal on the beach at Laysan. Note ripple pattern in coral sand, June 1969

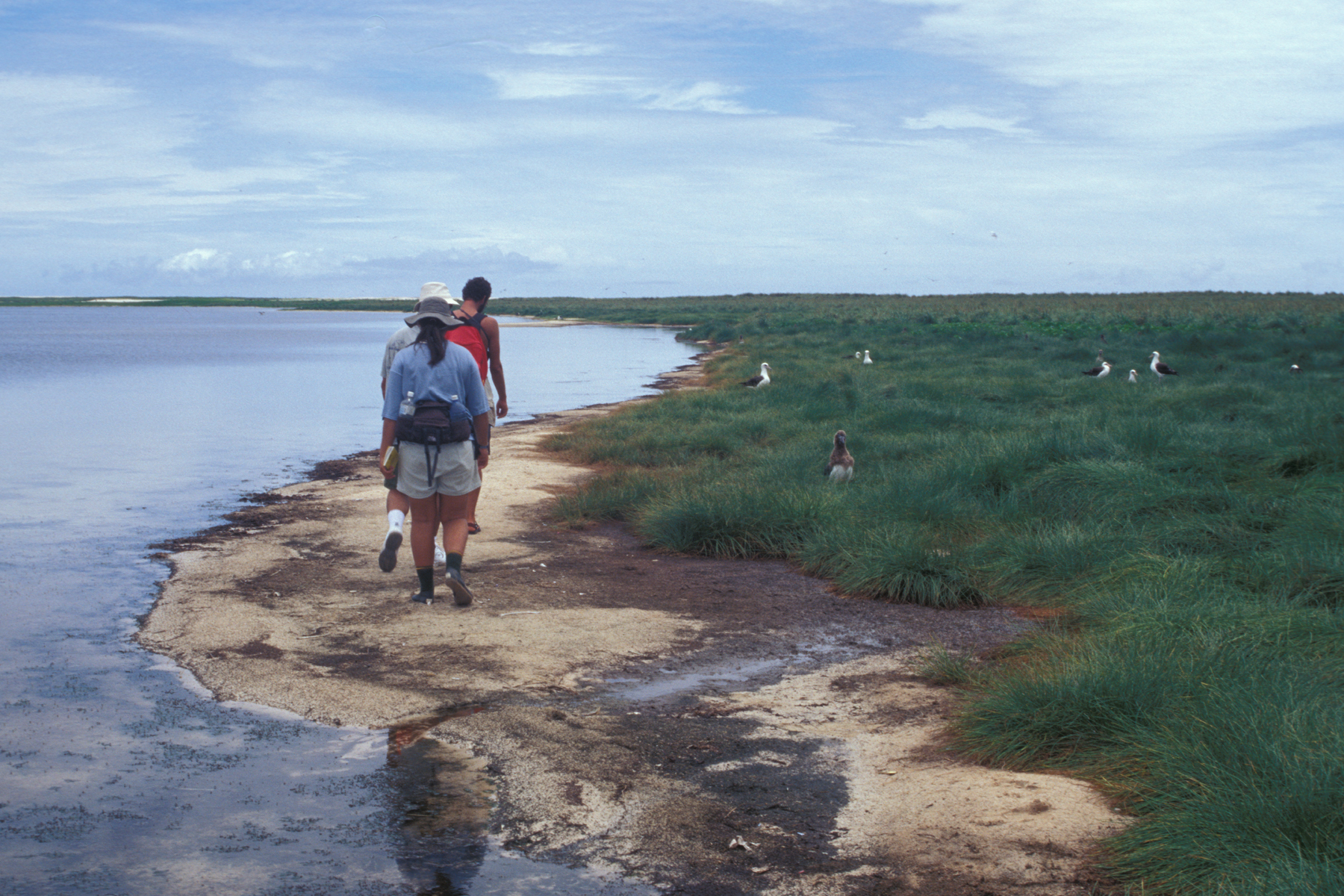
The shore of Lake Laysan

== History ==
=== Discovery and early expeditions ===
Native Hawaiians may have known about Kauō before Americans and Europeans sailed their ships into the region in the early 19th century (see below). The first reported sightings of the island were by Massachusetts-based whalers in the 1820s. The whalers were among many who took advantage of the newly discovered whaling grounds off the coast of Japan, making the waters around the Northwest Hawaiian archipelago an increasingly popular commercial route. The Nantucket Enquirer reported a sighting in 1825, which is probably the first reference to the name "Laysan" in print. This issue was referenced in a United States government survey of Pacific Ocean geography by J. N. Reynolds in 1828 which included the earlier whalers' reports, as well as a sighting of an island fitting Laysan's description by a Captain "Brigs" at 25° 47’ N, 172° W. That might refer to Captain John Briggs of New Bedford, who could have come across the island as early as 1822.

The coordinates recorded at the time by ships were generally rough estimates, and Reynolds's report simply compiled coordinates and names reported from various sources. The Nantucket Enquirer and Reynolds's report gave the position of "Laysan's Island" as 25°50′N 171°51′W, also listing 26°2′N 173°40′W; Reynolds also listed "Lassion's Island" at 26°2′N 173°35′W. The first set of coordinates is closer to the actual Laysan, while the second and "Lassion" are much closer to the next island in the archipelago to the northwest, Lisianski Island, named for Russian naval captain Yuri Lisiansky who discovered it in 1805. Given that Lisianski Island was a known feature for over twenty years and does not appear elsewhere in the list, it is likely that both names were corruptions of "Lisianski", and the crew who sighted Kauō misidentified it as Lisianski under the name they knew it by, "Laysan", thus giving the island its current name.

Various publications name Captain Stanyukovich, of the Russian ship Moller, as the discoverer of Laysan. Although he mapped the island in 1828, and attempted to name it for his ship, he was clearly there after the New Englanders, at least.

In 1857, Captain John Paty, of the Manuokawai, annexed Laysan to the Kingdom of Hawaiʻi.

The island had an economic value due to the presence of guano. In 1859, Captain Brooks, of the ship Gambia, traveled to the island and wrote that there was guano there, but "not of sufficient quantity to warrant any attempts to get it". Despite that, in 1890, George D. Freeth and Charles N. Spencer successfully petitioned the Kingdom of Hawaiʻi for permission to mine guano on Laysan and agreed to make royalty payments to the Kingdom. Around 100 short tons (91 t) were extracted per day. Given that, towards the end of the guano mining era, iron-hulled sailing ships had a capacity of 5,000 short tons (4,500 t), Laysan produced a shipload every two months.

Working conditions at the guano mine were grueling. In August 1900, Japanese workers mutinied against the American management. The strike action turned to violence because of a language barrier. As a result, there were two deaths and two injuries.

The publicity about Laysan attracted scientists and, in the next decade, many of the island's unique species were scientifically examined for the first time. However, the guano mining affected the island's ecosystem dramatically. Professor William Alanson Bryan of the Bernice P. Bishop Museum estimated that there were 10 million seabirds on Laysan in 1903 but, eight years later, the estimate was that there were little more than a million. In those eight years, the Pritchardia palms that were unique to Laysan, and the island's sandalwood trees (Santalum ellipticum), both became extinct.

1894 marked the arrival of Laysan's most notorious inhabitant, German immigrant Max Schlemmer, who was the superintendent of the guano mining operation. He released domestic rabbits, Belgian hares, European hares and even guinea pigs on the island, expecting them to multiply and provide supplies for a future meat-canning business. That had a disastrous effect on Laysan's indigenous flora and fauna.

=== Period of extinction ===
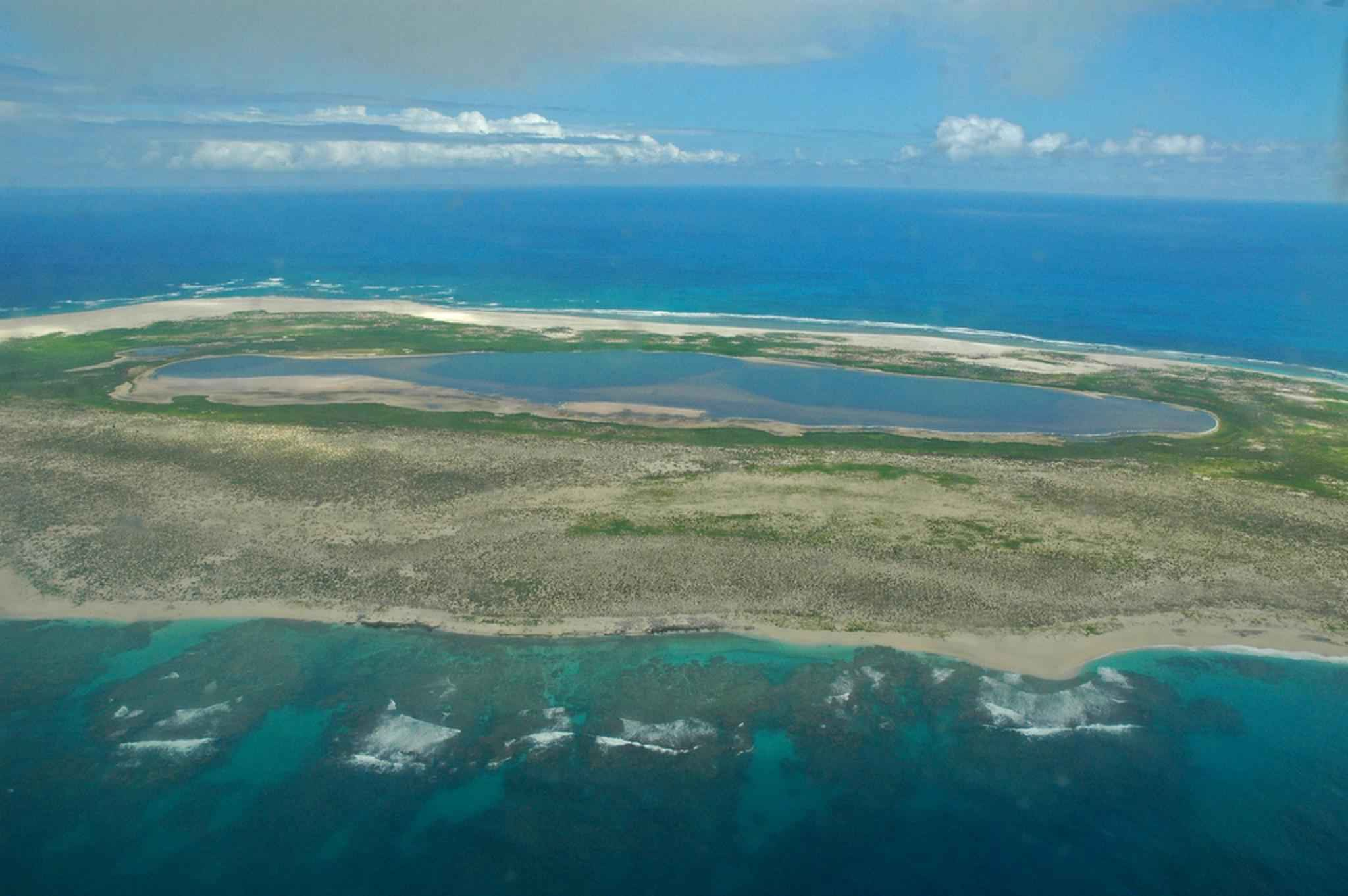
Laysan Island, 2013

The rabbits reproduced rapidly, and their appetite soon far exceeded the available vegetation on the island. Complaints about that, and about Japanese poachers of the bird population, led President Theodore Roosevelt to declare the Northwestern Hawaiian chain a bird sanctuary in 1909. Schlemmer continued to allow the Japanese to export bird wings illegally and so was removed from the island. However, without plant cover, much of the soil and sand became loose and blew about in dust storms. By 1918, the rabbits had eaten so much that the remaining vegetation was only enough to sustain 100 of them. In 1923, the Tanager Expedition arrived and achieved its aim of exterminating the last rabbits. As a result of the rabbits being on the island and breeding out of control, 26 endemic species of plants such as the Laysan fan palm, 3 endemic species of insects which are the Laysan dropseed noctuid moth, the Laysan weevil, and the Bryan's Kaou weevil Rhyncogonus bryani, and 3 endemic species of bird which are the Laysan rail, the Laysan millerbird, and the Laysan honeycreeper have become extinct. While two other endemic species, the Laysan duck, and the Laysan finch have survived but have become endangered, and the total bird population on the island was reduced to about a tenth of its former size

=== Recent history ===
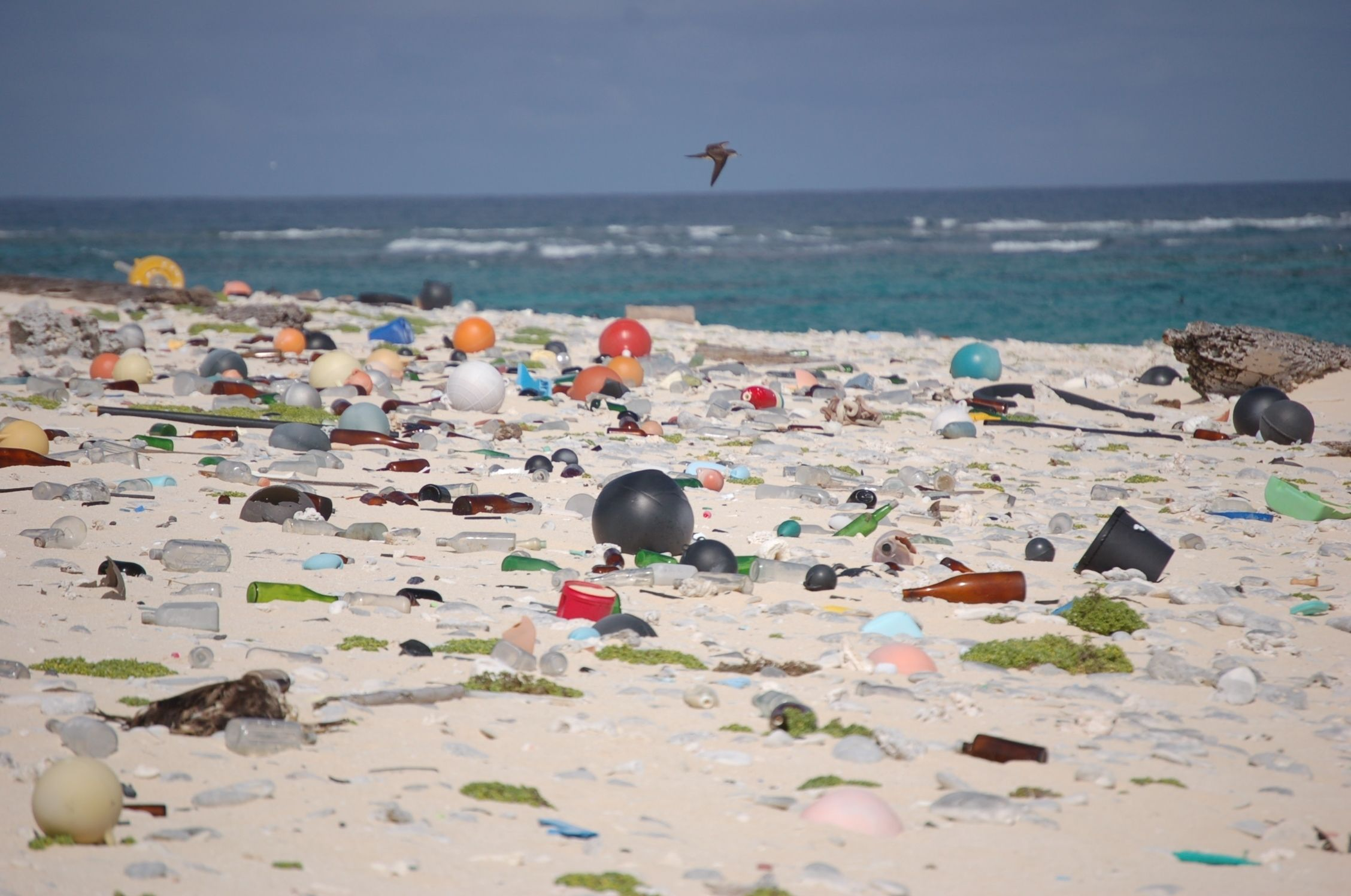
Marine debris washed up on Laysan

Like most of the Northwestern Hawaiian islands, Laysan is currently uninhabited. It is protected by the Hawaiian Natural Life Act of 1961 and is under the stewardship of the U.S. Fish and Wildlife Service, who have had success in eliminating pests, restoring the island's vegetation, and boosting the populations of species considered endangered.

Garbage from passing ships often washes ashore on Laysan. That poses a danger to birds because they can swallow plastic waste, which remains undigested and crowds their stomachs, leaving no room for their normal food. According to observations in her 2006 mission log, Patricia Greene, a NOAA Teacher-at-Sea, found that most of the plastic was of Japanese origin. Additionally, in the 1990s, biologists found that a container of poisonous carbofuran had floated ashore and burst open above the high tide line, creating a "dead zone" in which any living thing was killed.

==== Sandbur eradication ====
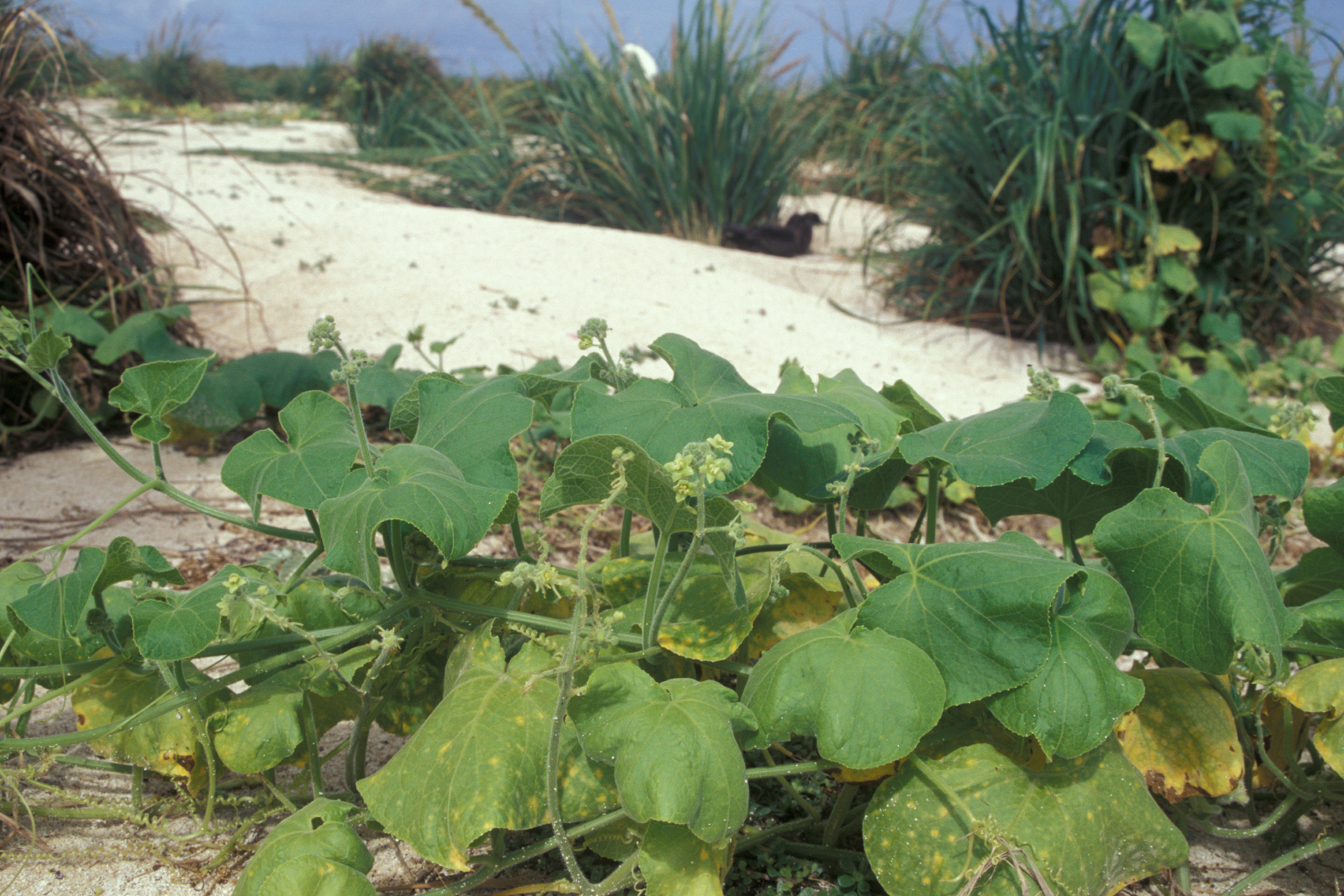
Inland on Laysan Sicyos maximowiczii, 1999

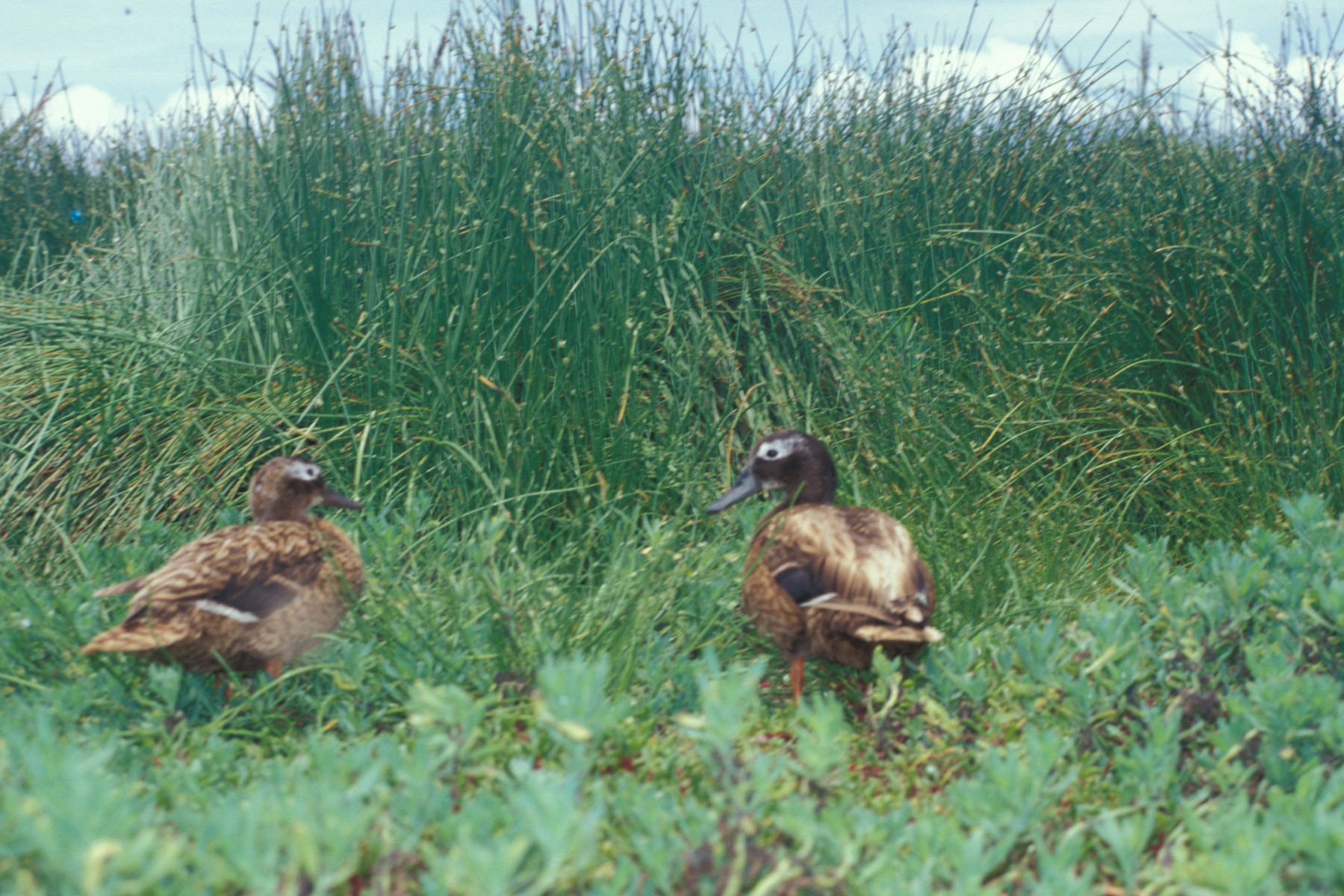
Laysan ducks by the island's lake

In 1991, the United States Fish and Wildlife Service began an effort to eradicate sandbur, an alien grass, which was first introduced in the 1960s by US Armed Forces personnel. Sandbur crowds out the native bunchgrass, which is habitat for birds. At a cost of almost one million dollars, the sandbur was completely removed by 2000. With that threat gone, the USFWS hoped to restore Laysan to its condition prior to European discovery.

To replace the native Pritchardia palms that had become extinct, the FWS wanted to bring in Pritchardia remota from Nīhoa, a similar species to Laysan's lost fan palm. The next step was to be introducing Nīhoa millerbirds, to replace the extinct Laysan millerbirds that are closely related. Those transfers were to accomplish a two-fold goal: to restore Laysan to an ecology similar to its pre-industrial one, and to protect those two species from extinction by maintaining a second population on Laysan. That way, if diseases, fires, or hurricanes obliterate the Nīhoa population, the population can be revived by translocation from Laysan.

==== "Laysan fever" ====
In 1991, several workers on Laysan contracted a feverish illness previously unknown there or anywhere else. It affected workers on Laysan in varying levels of severity: one woman was evacuated for persistent fever, but others exhibited very mild symptoms. Cedric Yoshimoto, of the University of Hawaiʻi at Mānoa School of Public Health, wrote that "surveillance has identified a newly-described illness of humans termed 'Laysan fever (LF)' It is associated with bites of the seabird tick Ornithodoros capensis... [and] joins a short list of human illnesses associated with seabird colonies..." The symptoms of Q fever overlap significantly with those of Laysan fever, and scientists have speculated as to their possible common causes.

== Possible ancient Hawaiian presence ==
In 2003, an archaeologist examining sediment cores found pollen from coconut palms deep below the bottom of the central lagoon. That unexpected find raised several questions. Before that, no evidence existed that the coconut ever reached any of the Hawaiian Islands before the arrival of the Polynesian voyagers. Further, there has never been any physical evidence that the ancient Hawaiians extended their exploration of the Hawaiian chain beyond Nīhoa and Mokumanamana (Necker). Dating the sediment containing the Cocos pollen is imprecise, but appears to have been deposited some time between 5,500 years ago and the arrival of Europeans in Hawaiian waters in the late 18th century. The full length of the core was 70 feet (21 m) and is thought to represent a record spanning 7,000 years. Coconut pollen was not found in the deeper (older) part of the core. However, cores from Guam in the western Pacific show the presence of coconut trees there as early as 9,000 years ago, well before human habitation. Hawaiian traditions suggest that the Hawaiians were aware that islands existed to the north-west, and the pollen evidence could be interpreted as proof of early Hawaiian visits to Laysan. More precise dating of the sediment layers will be needed to better interpret the find.

== Distinctive species of Laysan ==
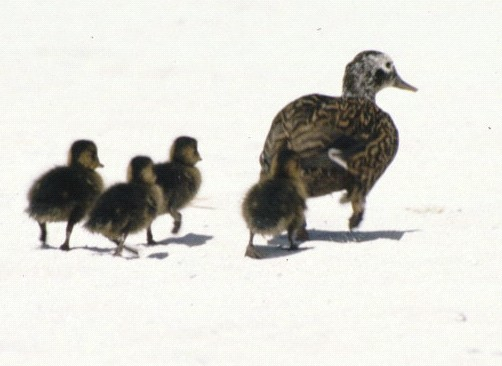
A Laysan duck mother and her ducklings

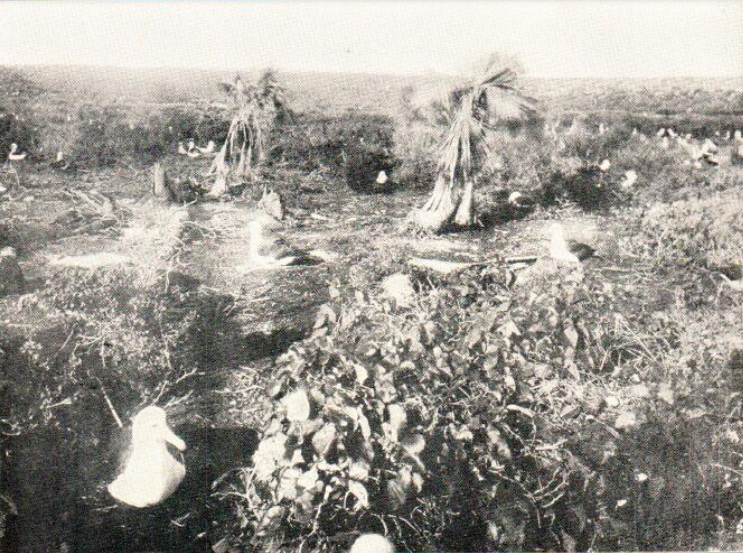
Two living Laysan fan palms and the stumps of others. Photographed sometime between 1891 and 1896.

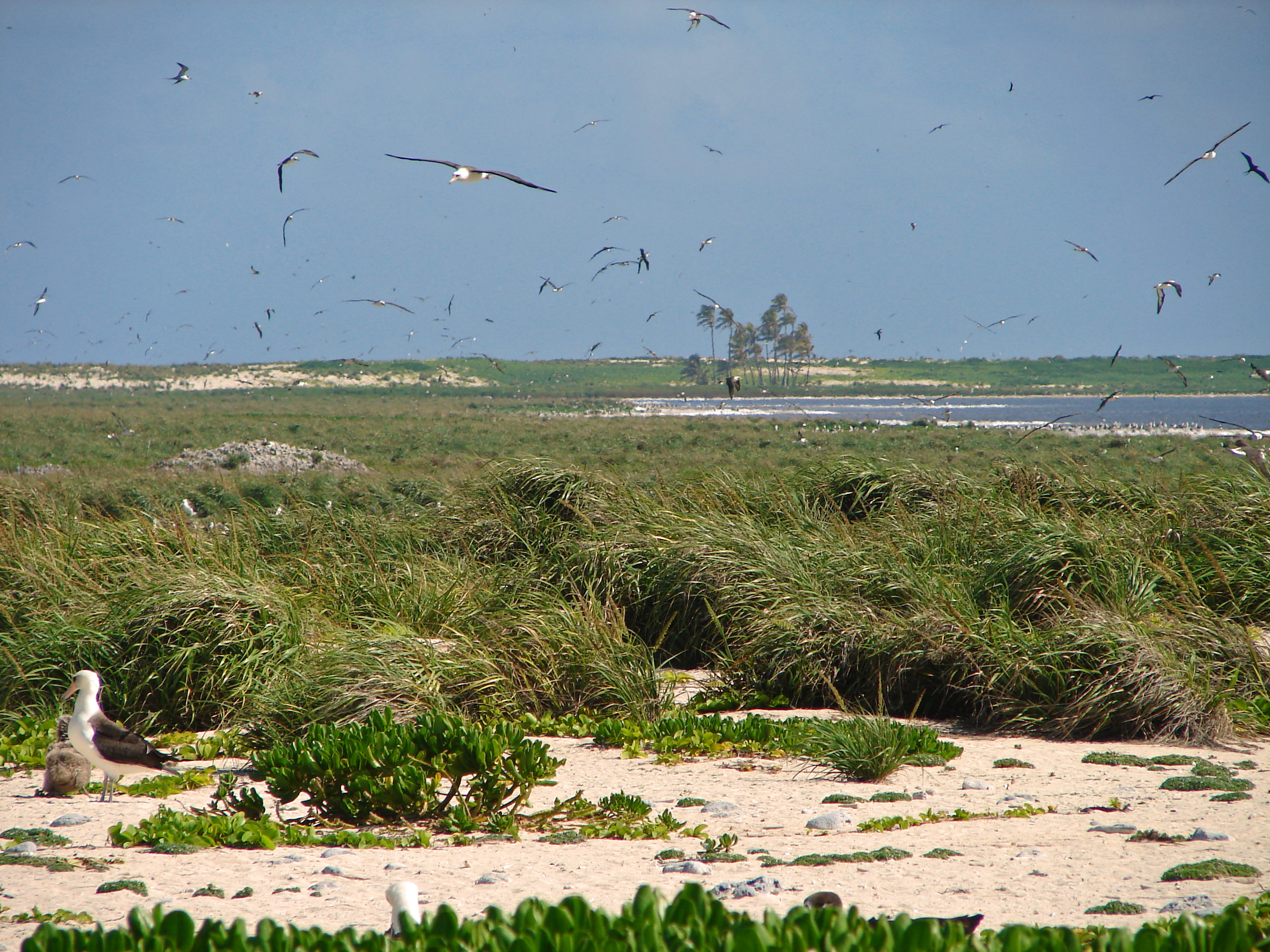
The interior of Laysan, showing its lake and the birds that nest there

Laysan is generally regarded as the "gem" of the NWHI, with the most biodiversity. It is home to the Laysan duck, the rarest duck in the world. The other native land bird of Laysan is the Laysan finch, an opportunistic hunter. Eighteen other bird species nest there and use Lake Laysan, the only lake in the NWHI, as a rest stop or breeding ground. Laysan also has its share of native plants, many of which, such as Eragrostis variabilis, were extirpated from Laysan during its "extinction period" and then reintroduced from other leeward islands by scientists. Like most other of the NWHI, Laysan is home to Hawaiian monk seals and green sea turtles.

=== Birds ===
- Laysan finch, Telespiza cantans – endemic
- Laysan duck, Anas laysanensis – endemic
- Laysan albatross, Phoebastria immutabilis – nearly endemic
- Black-footed albatross, Phoebastria nigripes
- Short-tailed albatross, Phoebastria albatrus
- Great frigatebird, Fregata minor
- Lesser frigatebird, Fregata ariel
- White tern (or "fairy tern"), Gygis alba
- Sooty tern, Onychoprion fuscatus
- Spectacled tern, Onychoprion lunata
- Bristle-thighed curlew, Numenius tahitiensis
- Pacific golden plover, Pluvialis fulva
- Christmas shearwater, Puffinus nativitatis
- Red-tailed tropicbird, Phaethon rubricauda rothschildi
- Brown noddy, Anous stolidus
- Black noddy, Anous minutus melangogenys
- Masked booby, Sula dactylatra
- Brown booby, Sula leucogaster
- Red-footed booby, Sula sula rubripes
- Bonin petrel, Pterodroma hypoleuca
- Laysan rail, Porzana palmeri – extinct, endemic
- Laysan honeycreeper Himatione fraithii – extinct, endemic
- Laysan millerbird, Acrocephalus familiaris familiaris – extinct, endemic

=== Invertebrates ===
- Laysan dropseed noctuid moth, (Hypena laysanensis) – extinct
- Laysan noctuid moth, (Agrotis laysanensis) – endemic
- Procellaris agrotis noctuid moth, (Agrotis procellaris) – endemic
- Laysan weevil, (Oedemasylus laysanensis) – extinct
- Bryan’s Kauō weevil, (Rhyncogonus bryani) – endemic and extinct
- Bryan’s northwestern hawaiian snail, (Tornatellides bryani) – also present on Lisianski and Midway, extant

== See also ==
- Desert island
- List of islands
