= Oodemas laysanensis =

Conservation status
- Extinct (IUCN 3.1)

Scientific classification
- Kingdom: Animalia
- Phylum: Arthropoda
- Clade: Pancrustacea
- Class: Insecta
- Order: Coleoptera
- Suborder: Polyphaga
- Infraorder: Cucujiformia
- Superfamily: Curculionoidea
- Family: Curculionidae
- Genus: Oodemas
- Species: †O. laysanensis

Binomial name
- †Oodemas laysanensis Fullaway, 1914

Synonyms
- Oedemasylus laysanensis

Species of beetle

Oodemas laysanensis, the Laysan weevil, was a species of beetle in family Curculionidae. It was endemic to the United States (Laysan, Hawaiian Islands) (declared extinct in 1986).

== See also ==
- List of extinct animals of the Hawaiian Islands
