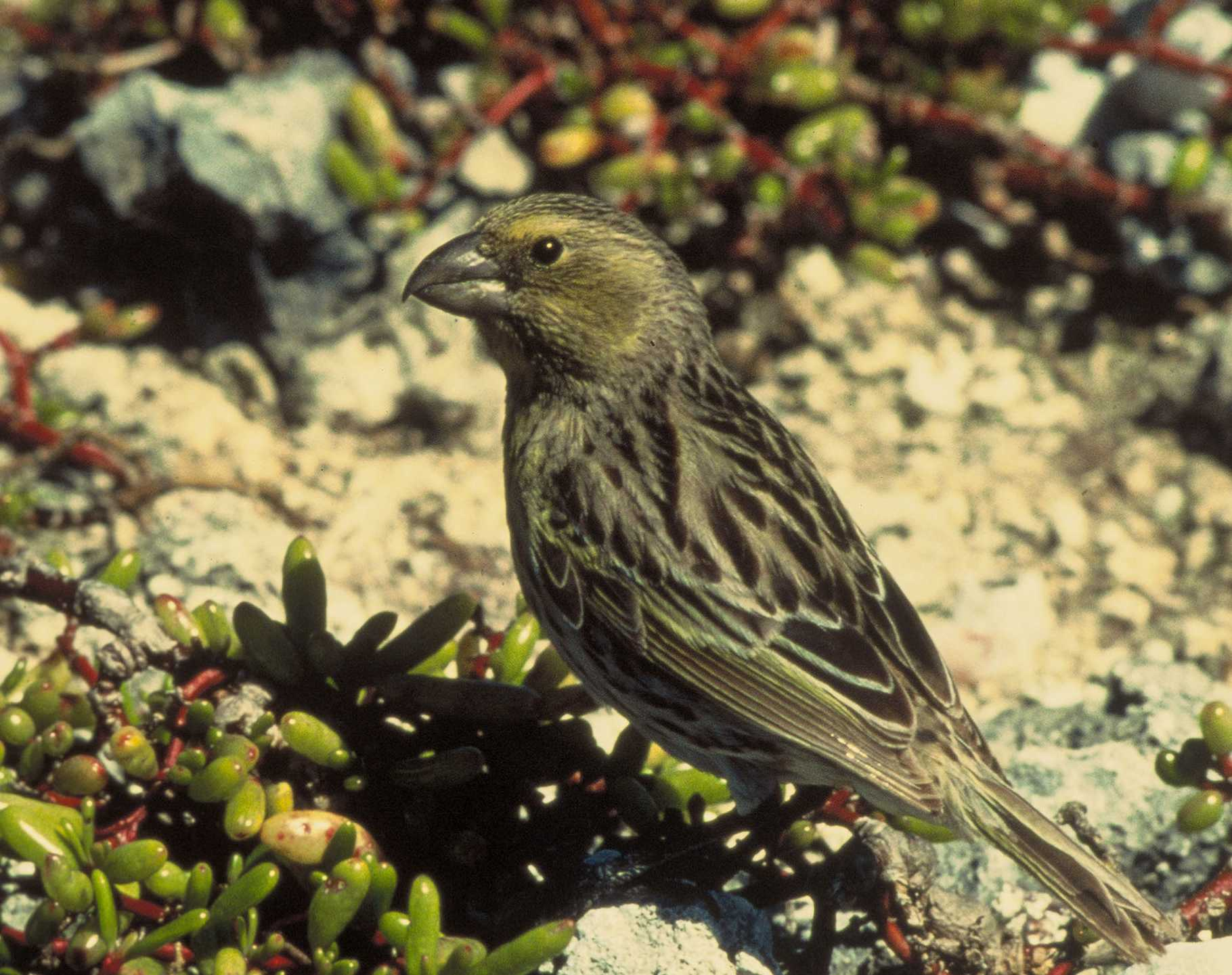

Conservation status
- Vulnerable (IUCN 3.1)

Scientific classification
- Kingdom: Animalia
- Phylum: Chordata
- Class: Aves
- Order: Passeriformes
- Family: Fringillidae
- Subfamily: Carduelinae
- Genus: Telespiza
- Species: T. cantans

Binomial name
- Telespiza cantans Wilson, SB, 1890
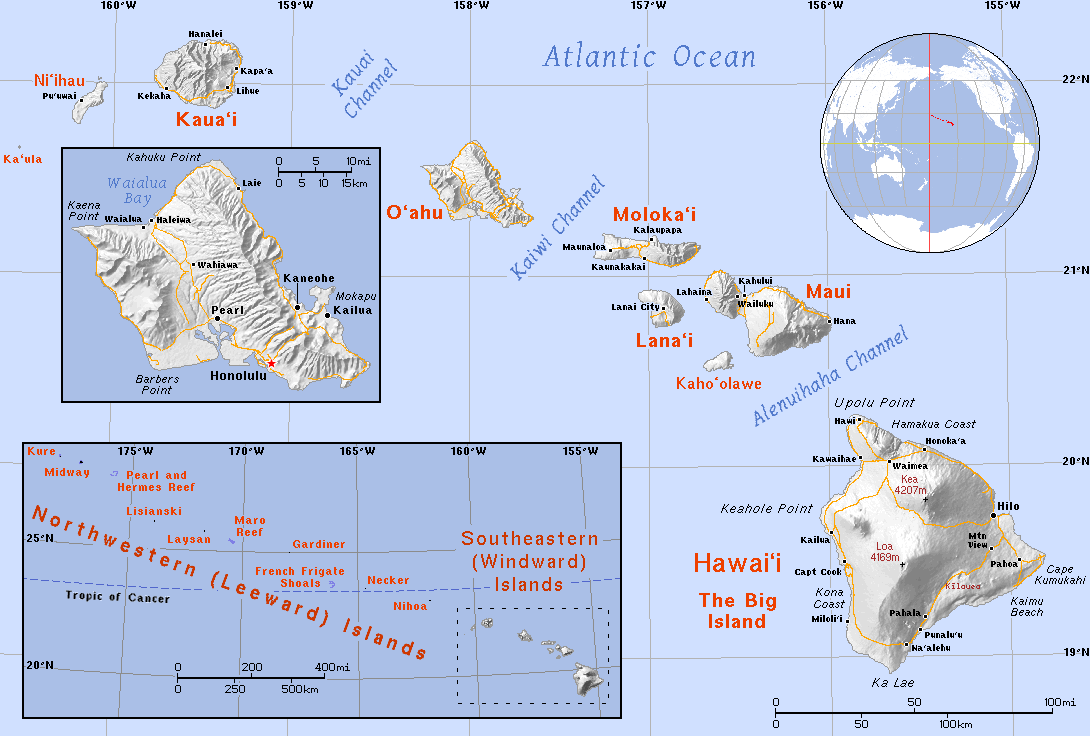
- Map of Hawaii showing Laysan in the lower left inset box

= Laysan finch =

Species of bird

The Laysan finch (Telespiza cantans), sometimes referred to by its Hawaiian name, ʻekupuʻu, is a species of Hawaiian honeycreeper, that is endemic to the Northwestern Hawaiian Islands. It is one of four remaining finch-billed Hawaiian honeycreepers and is closely related to the smaller Nihoa finch. The Laysan finch is named for Laysan, the island to which it was endemic on its discovery. It was subsequently introduced to a few other atolls, and its historical range included some of the main islands.

== Description ==
The Laysan finch is a large honeycreeper with a heavy bill. Overall the male has yellow plumage with a whitish belly and a grey neck. The female is duller than the male, with brown streaking. It is almost impossible to confuse the Laysan finch with any other bird in the field as it is the only passerine species found on the few islands it lives on.

== Range and behavior ==
=== Range ===
On its discovery, the Laysan finch was an endemic resident of the small island of Laysan, along with the Laysan rail (Porzana palmeri), the Laysan honeycreeper (Himatione fraithii), the Laysan duck (Anas laysanensis), and the Laysan millerbird (Acrocephalus familiaris familiaris). Populations were introduced to several islands, including Pearl and Hermes Atoll, where the species persists, and Midway Atoll, where it survived until the introduction of rats. The fossil record shows that the finch once had a greater range in Hawaiʻi, reaching as far as Oʻahu, and that birds on Laysan represent a relict population.

=== Behavior ===
The Laysan finch nests in vegetation, laying three eggs in a cup-shaped nest. These are incubated for 16 days by the female, the male in turn feeding the female. The chicks fledge after three weeks and are cared for by the parents for another three weeks.

The Laysan finch is a generalist, feeding on seeds, small insects, fruit, carrion (of seabirds and Hawaiian monk seals), and the eggs of nesting seabirds. While unable to break into the eggs of the larger seabirds (such as albatross and boobies) they will scavenge from them. They actively take the eggs of smaller seabirds such as those of white tern (Gygis alba) and the endemic Laysan duck (Anas laysanensis).

== Conservation ==
The Laysan finch is listed as Vulnerable by the IUCN because of its highly restricted range and vulnerability to extremes of weather, and it is considered endangered by the State of Hawaiʻi and U.S. government. It survived the devastating effects of the introduction of domestic rabbits on Laysan Island (unlike the Laysan millerbird, honeycreeper and rail) by taking carrion and seabird eggs. However, this caused their population to shrink to fewer than 100 individuals and the bottleneck caused a reduction in genetic diversity that may have put the species at increased risk of extinction. The birds also suffered a loss of heterozygosity following founding events on other islands which may have caused an accumulation of deleterious recessive alleles in the populations.

Laysan is now part of the Hawaiian Islands National Wildlife Refuge. The population is considered stable with the biggest threat being uncontrollable climate change.

== Gallery ==
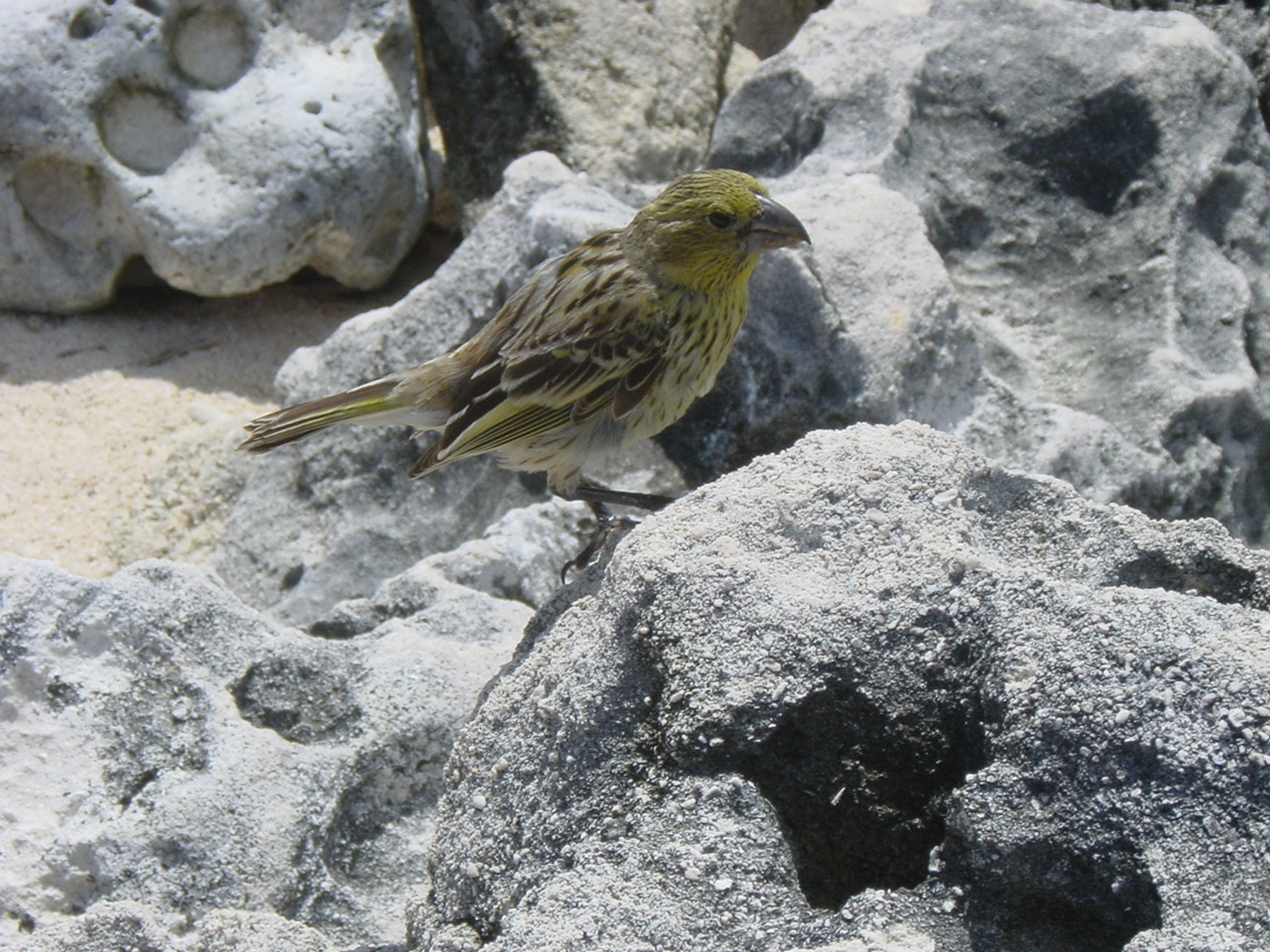
On Laysan

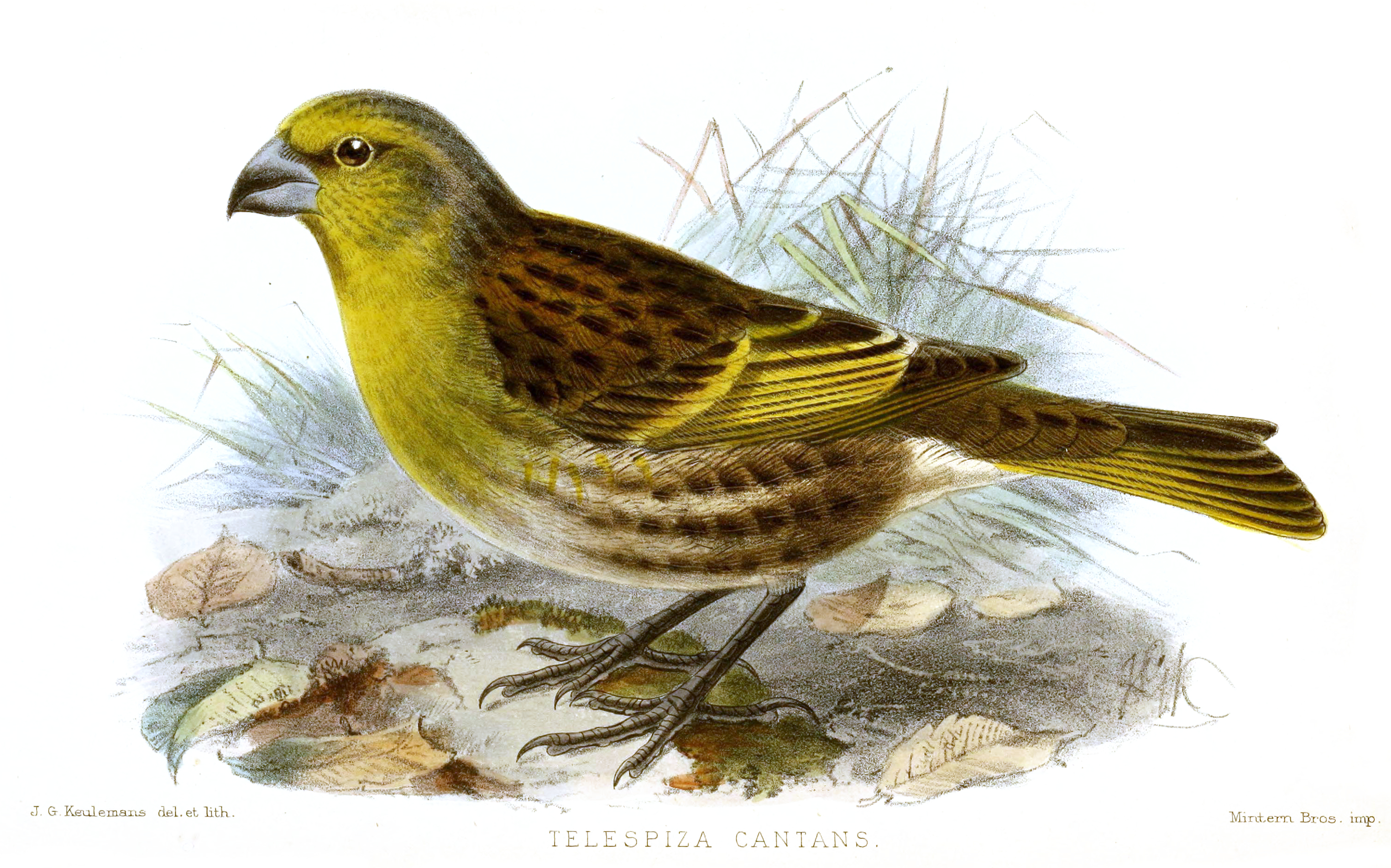
Illustration

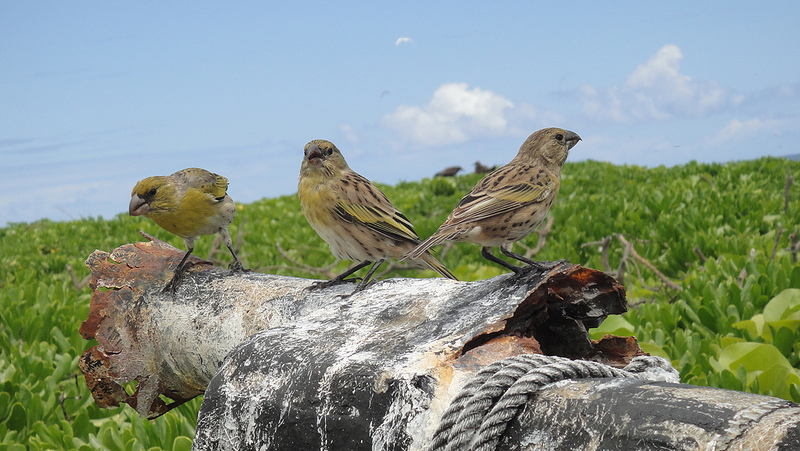
Habitat

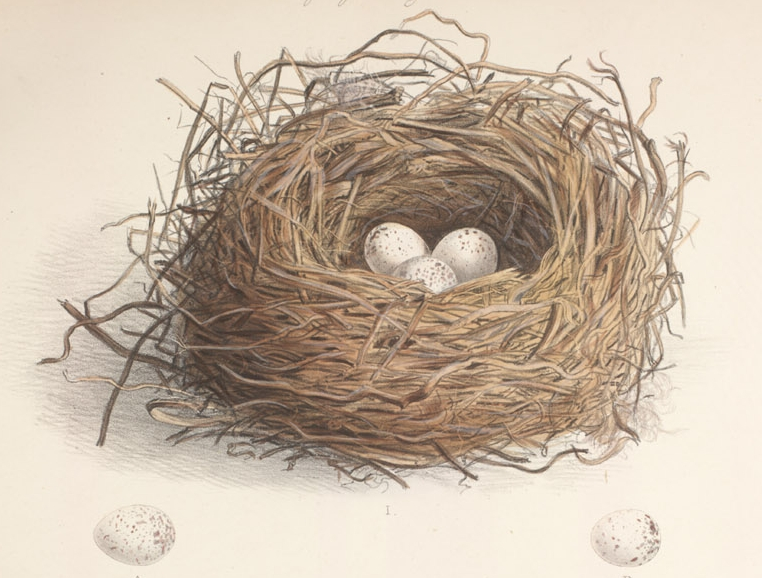
Nest

== See also ==
- Climate change
- Conservation biology
- Founder effect
- Genetic diversity
- List of threatened birds of the United States
- List of vulnerable birds
- Population bottleneck
