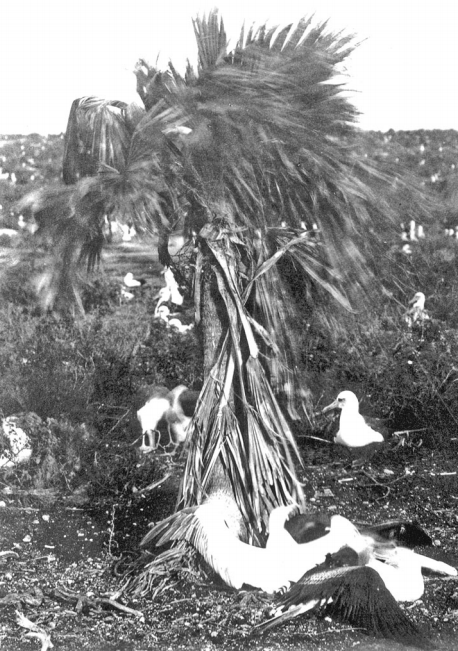
- Fan palm on Laysan. Photographed sometime between 1891 and 1893.

Conservation status
- Extinct (1896)

Scientific classification
- Kingdom: Plantae
- Clade: Tracheophytes
- Clade: Angiosperms
- Clade: Monocots
- Clade: Commelinids
- Order: Arecales
- Family: Arecaceae
- Tribe: Trachycarpeae
- Genus: Pritchardia (?)
- Species: †P. (?) sp.

Binomial name
- †Pritchardia (?) sp.

= Laysan fan palm =

Extinct species of fan palm

The Laysan fan palm is an extinct species of palm, not formally described, but most likely in the genus Pritchardia. Once endemic to the island of Laysan, it had become extinct by 1896.

== History ==
The palm was first mentioned in 1828 by early visitors to Laysan Island. Karl Izembek, surgeon of the Russian ship Moller, was the first to write of the species. In 1859, there was an account of only five mature individuals remaining.

By the time the German zoologist, Hugo Schauinsland, visited in 1896, all the palms had been killed. He blamed human activity, citing evidence of palm wood in charcoal. He noticed many remaining stumps, alluding to a population of several hundred decades before. Evidence of the palms was last observed in 1914 as "decaying remains".

== Description ==
The palms were known to be up to 15 feet (5 m) tall. Schauinsland noticed stumps with a diameter of up to 50 cm. He was told that the palms had huge fan-shaped leaves, long inflorescences, and long fruit racemes, leading him to identify it as a Pritchardia. The species was once widespread on the island. Dense forests were hypothesized to exist, based on historic palynology.

Few photos of the palms are known to exist, and they are not of sufficient quality to allow identification. No physical collections are known to exist. Based on the photographic evidence, it has been suggested that the species was identical to Pritchardia remota (Nihoa fan palm). Another theory is that the Laysan fan palm was a separate species. That was supported by New Zealand botanist, George Campbell Munro, who studied both the Laysan fan palm and the Nihoa fan palm, and claimed they were distinct. Pritchardia species are known to be highly localized, which also supports the theory that the Laysan fan palm was a separate species.
