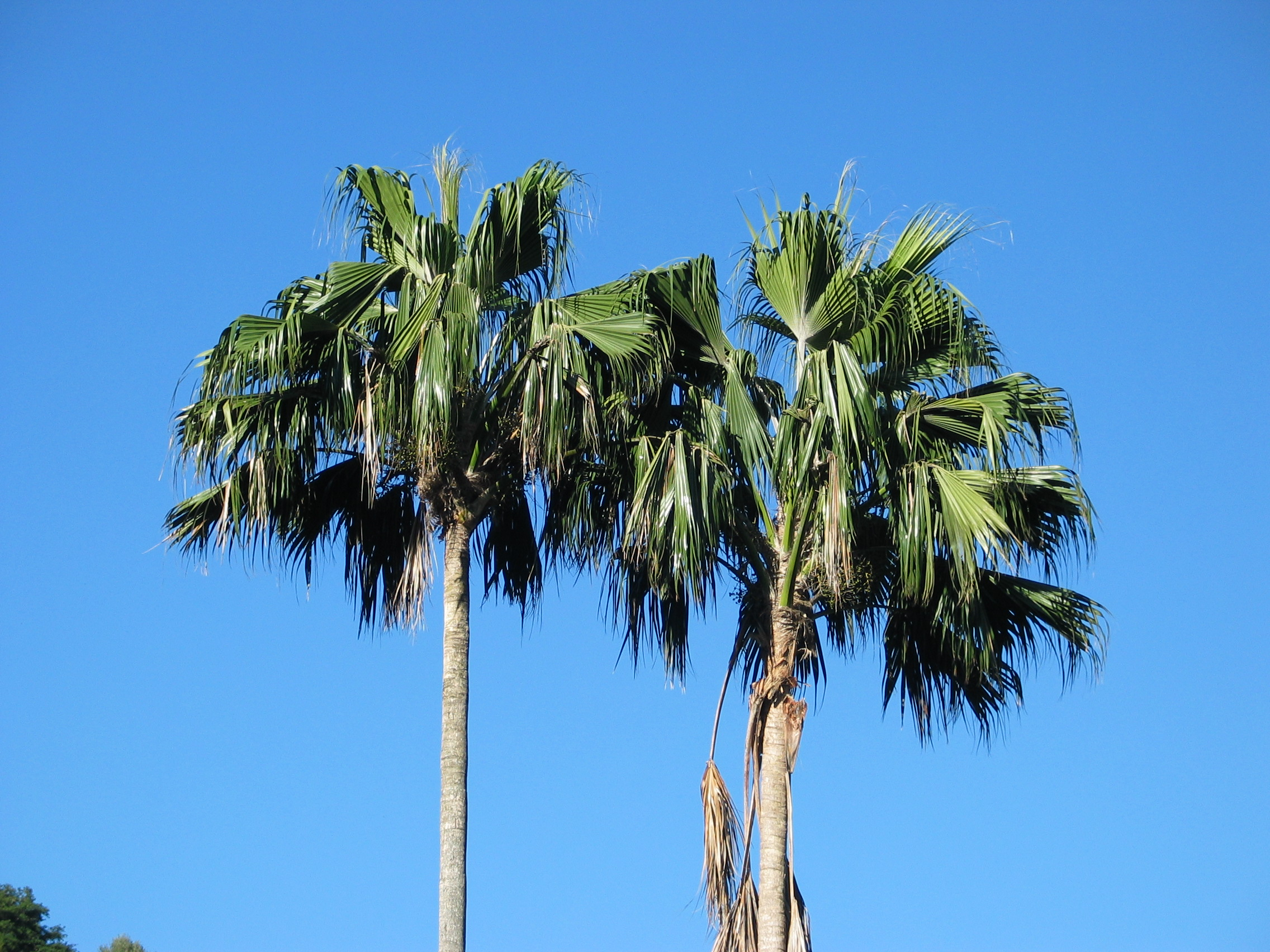

Conservation status
- Endangered (IUCN 2.3)

Scientific classification
- Kingdom: Plantae
- Clade: Tracheophytes
- Clade: Angiosperms
- Clade: Monocots
- Clade: Commelinids
- Order: Arecales
- Family: Arecaceae
- Tribe: Trachycarpeae
- Genus: Pritchardia
- Species: P. remota

Binomial name
- Pritchardia remota Becc.

= Pritchardia remota =

Species of palm

Pritchardia remota, the Nīhoa pritchardia, Nīhoa fan palm, or Loulu, is a species of palm endemic on the island of Nīhoa in the state of Hawaii, and later transplanted to the island of Laysan. It is a smaller tree than most other species of Pritchardia, typically reaching only 4–5 metres (13–16 ft) tall and with a trunk diameter of 15 centimetres (5.9 in). It is the only type of tree on the island and used to be abundant. In 1885 a wildfire ravaged the island, destroying most of the palms. Only about 700 of these trees remain, making the species endangered but numbers are slowly increasing. The palm is being cultivated in botanical gardens.

Though it is impossible to mistake P. remota for any other species in its natural habitat, it can be discerned from other Pritchardia species by its wavy leaves, its short and hairless inflorescences, and its tiny, spherical fruits.

A similar undescribed species existed on Laysan, the Laysan fan palm, but was made extinct after Laysan was mined for guano.

== Habitat ==
A 1996 survey found a total of four plant populations of 680 palms on the island. Groves of P. remota palms grow in coastal mesic valley depressions in two valleys on Nīhoa: The largest population grows in the West Palm Valley, while the three smaller populations are found in the East Palm Valley. Up to 50% of the pollen found in soil cores taken from lowland sites in the Main Islands comes from Pritchardia palms similar to this species. This is because these palms were once abundant there until around the year 1000, when the human population grew dramatically. The trees were cleared for agriculture and used for timber and firewood.

Ancient Nihoans probably used the trees expansively as well, and this could have caused their water supply to be contaminated with guano. This, in conjunction with several drought years due to El Niño, could have caused the residents of Nīhoa to give up and return to the Main Islands, which indeed happened before Nīhoa was discovered by the Europeans in the 18th century. The species's longevity is also threatened by flash floods which have been noted to occur in the lower part of Nīhoa's East Palm Valley, one habitat of the palm.

Pritchardia remota provides a nesting place for red-footed boobies and a perching spot for brown noddies.

== Bibliography ==
- United States Fish and Wildlife Service (March 1998). "Final Recovery Plan for Three Plant Species on Nihoa Island" (PDF). Final. United States Fish and Wildlife Service: 10547–10550.
- Evenhuis, Neal L.; Eldredge, Lucius G., eds. (2004). Natural History of Nihoa and Necker Islands. Bishop Museum Bulletin in Cultural and Environmental Studies; No. 1. Honolulu, Hawaii: Bishop Museum Press. ISBN 978-1-58178-029-1. OCLC 231994590.
- Gray, Mike (2008). "Pritchardia remota". Palms. Palm and Cycad Society of Australia.
- Hawaii Biological Survey (2006). "Pritchardia remota". Good Guys and Bad Guys. Bernice P. Bishop Museum.
- Rauzon, Mark (2001). Isles of Refuge: Wildlife and History of the Northwestern Hawaiian Islands. University of Hawaii Press. Honolulu, Hawaii: Bishop Museum Press. ISBN 978-0-8248-2330-6.
