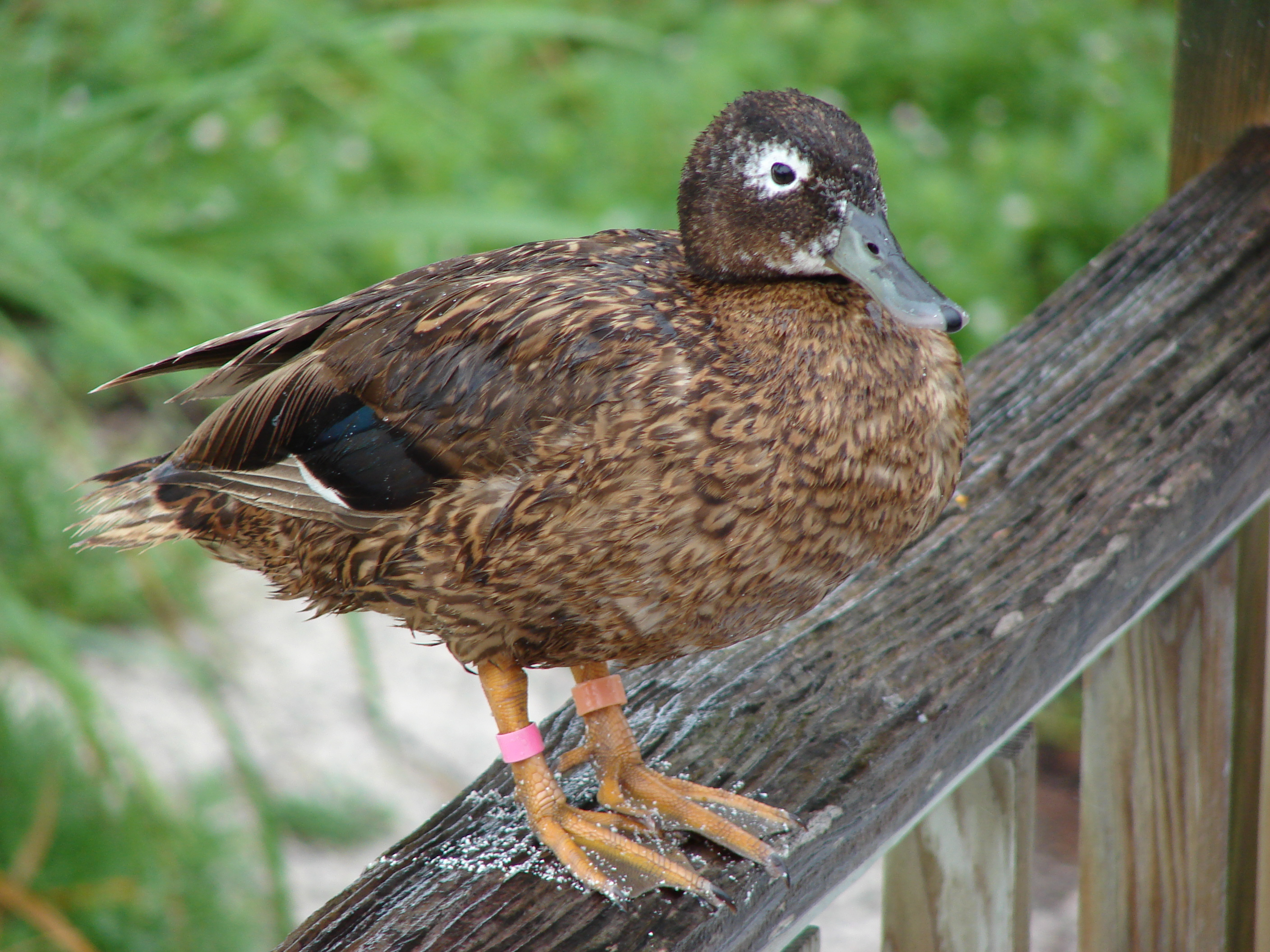
- Female bird at Midway

Conservation status
- Critically Endangered (IUCN 3.1)
- CITES Appendix I

Scientific classification
- Kingdom: Animalia
- Phylum: Chordata
- Class: Aves
- Order: Anseriformes
- Family: Anatidae
- Genus: Anas
- Species: A. laysanensis

Binomial name
- Anas laysanensis Rothschild, 1892
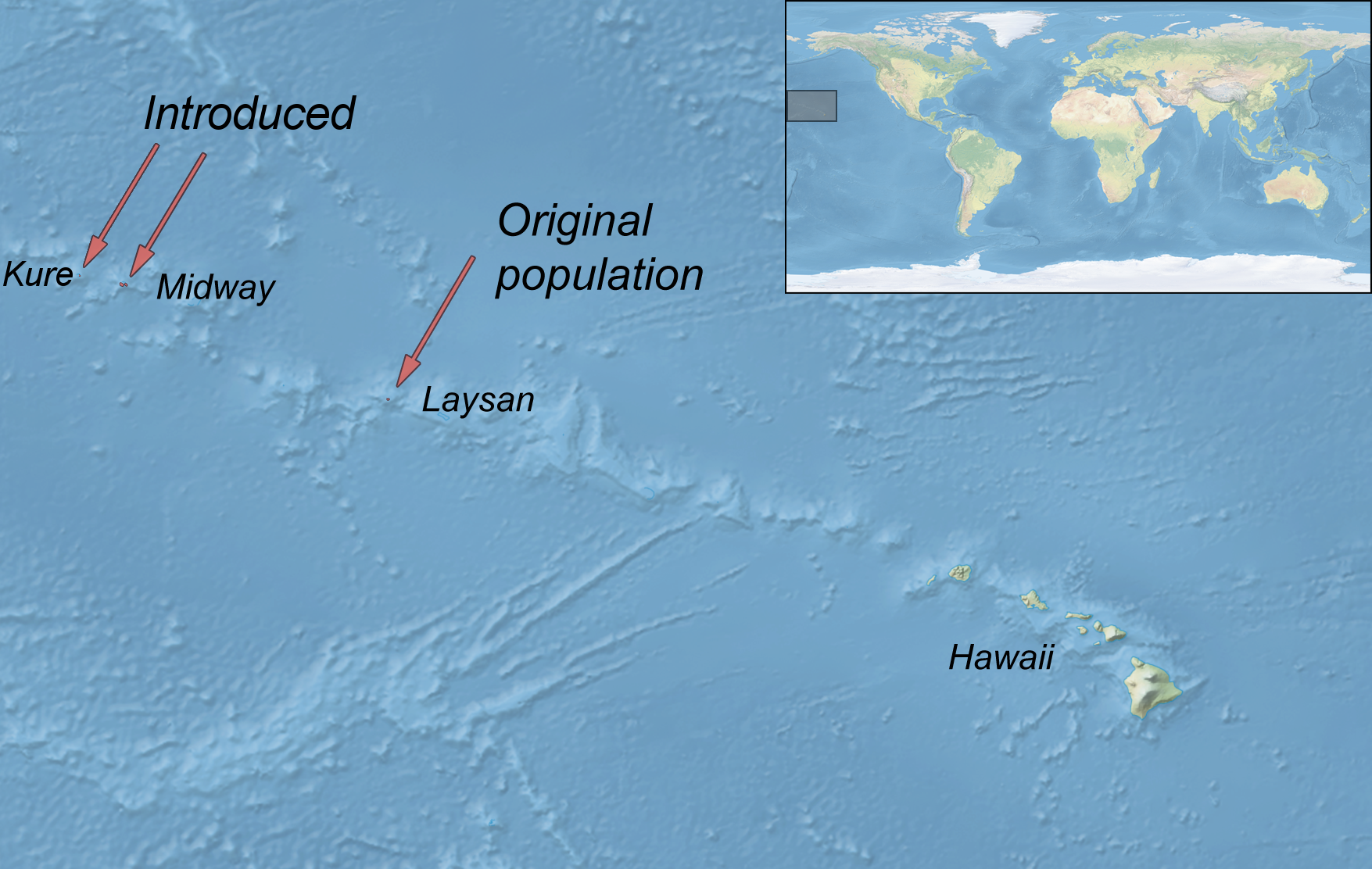
- Distribution map of the Laysan duck

= Laysan duck =

Laysan duck Temporal range: Holocene–Present

Species of bird

The Laysan duck (Anas laysanensis), also known as the Laysan teal, and sometimes known by its Hawaiian name, koloa pōhaka, is a dabbling duck endemic to the Hawaiian Islands. Fossil evidence reveals that Laysan ducks once lived across the entire archipelago, but today survive only on Laysan Island and two atolls. The duck has several physical and behavioral traits linked to the absence of ground-based predators in its habitat. By 1860, the ducks had disappeared from everywhere except Laysan Island. The introduction of European rabbits by guano miners at the end of the 19th century brought the bird to the brink of extinction in 1912, with twelve surviving individuals. Rabbits were eradicated from the island in 1923 and numbers of Laysan ducks began to rise, reaching 500 by the 1950s. In an effort to ensure the long-term future of this duck, 42 birds were translocated to Midway Atoll National Wildlife Refuge in 2002. These thrived in their new surroundings, and another group were later relocated to Kure Atoll.

== Taxonomy ==
Named by Lionel Walter Rothschild in 1892, the Laysan duck is named after Laysan island, one of the Northwestern Hawaiian Islands. It is a member of the mallard clade of dabbling ducks, and is a highly unusual species, both behaviorally and genetically. Recent evidence suggests they originated from an east Asian, southern hemisphere ancestor of mallards, not from stray migratory mallards (Anas platyrhynchos) as had been reported in the past.

== Description ==
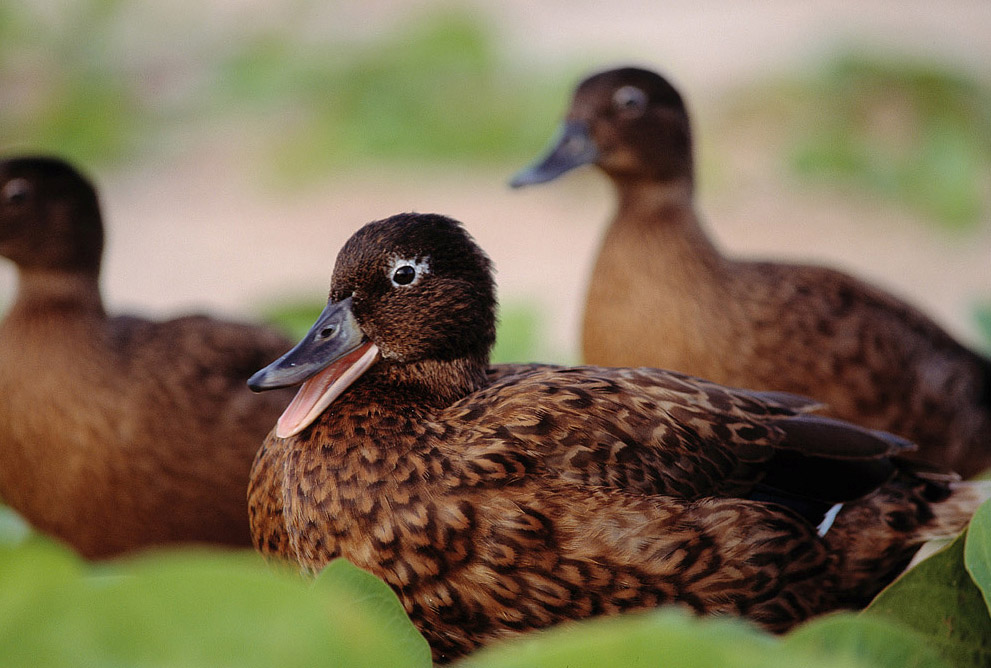
Three Laysan ducks (Anas laysanensis)

The Laysan duck is teal-sized and dark brown, with a prominent white eye-ring. The bill is short and spatulate, dark green with variable black blotching in males, and dull orange with variable black blotching in females. The Laysan duck usually has a ring of fat around its neck. Some males show faint iridescence on the head or neck and have slightly upturned central tail feathers. The wing has an iridescent purplish-green patch (speculum feathers) in both sexes. Leucistism, or extensive white feathering, is common on the head and neck of older birds. The legs and feet are orange, usually brighter in the male. The annual pre-basic molt is complete, and the ducks lose all their flight feathers and become incapable of flight until new feathers grow in. Wild ducks have been known to live to the age of twelve years, and captive birds have lived to the age of eighteen.

== Behavior ==
The Laysan duck is a poor flyer, but walks and runs well, with a pelvic girdle adapted to terrestrial foraging. Its wings and wing muscles are reduced; it prefers to freeze in place when pursued. Energetic foraging behavior includes a fly-snapping sprint through Neoscatella sexnotata brine fly swarms. With necks outstretched, and bills close to the ground, the ducks run along a mudflat and as clouds of flies rise up in front, snap them up by rapidly opening and closing their bills. The ducks also will dabble and filter feed along lake shallows, shore, and in upland vegetation for macroinvertebrates, algae, leaves, and seeds. During the day, and especially in the breeding season, they prefer to hide among the grass and shrub vegetation, helping them to avoid avian predators such as frigatebirds. On Laysan Island, they prefer to venture out in the open and feed on the lake from dusk til dawn, although there seems to be marked variation from year to year according to the availability of food items.

=== Reproduction ===
Pair formation begins in autumn, and nest building begins in spring. The female builds a well-concealed nest on the ground below dense vegetation, especially Eragrostis variabilis bunchgrass. The nest is a shallow bowl lined with dead grass and down feathers. Egg-laying typically occurs from April to August. Average clutch size on Laysan Island is approximately four. The more recently established population on Midway lays larger clutches, presumably because of better availability of food. Ducklings are precocious and feed on their own day two after hatching, but are guarded, brooded, and led to foraging sites by the hen for approximately 40 to 60 days.

== Status and conservation ==
=== Decline to near-extinction ===
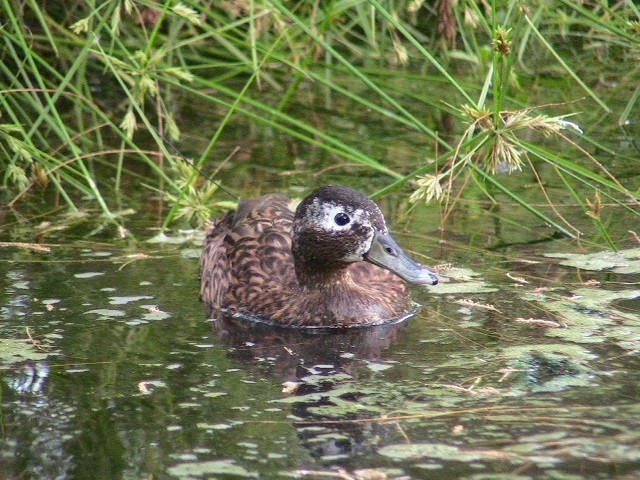
Male Laysan duck

The decline of the Laysan duck began between AD 400 and 1000, with the colonization of the Hawaiian Islands by Polynesians and associated non-native mammalian predators. By 1860, the ducks disappeared from all but Laysan Island (the duck's namesake), most likely due to predation by introduced rats. Like many isolated island species, the Laysan duck evolved in an environment lacking mammalian predators, and is ill-suited to defend itself against non-native ground hunters, such as humans, rats, pigs, and small Asian mongooses. For example, Laysan ducks are more likely to freeze their movement rather than flush or fly when startled—a strategy well suited for cryptic defense against Hawaiʻi's native flying predators, but ineffective against ground predators. The Laysan duck can still fly, but not very well and not for long distances; it has not dispersed between principal islands of the Northwestern Hawaiian Islands, which are separated by dozens of miles.

The Laysan duck found refuge through most of the nineteenth century on rat-free Laysan Island, surviving within the smallest geographic range of any duck species worldwide (415 hectares or 1.60 square miles). Laysan Island gained federal protection in 1909, with the establishment of the Hawaiian Islands National Wildlife Refuge. However, devastation of the island's vegetation by introduced domestic rabbits brought the duck to the brink of extinction in 1912, with an all-time low population of seven adults and five juveniles.

It is also said by the Fish and Wildlife when they returned to eliminate the last of the rabbits that there was just one Laysan duck hen that still existed on the island on a nest with broken eggs in it. By this information would pertain that all Laysan Teals are from this female and the fact they can be fertile up to 1 month after copulation.

=== Recovery ===
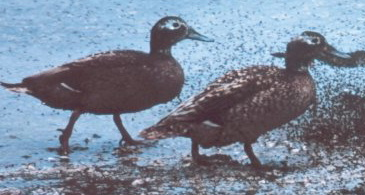
Laysan ducks chasing brine flies

After many domestic rabbits starved and the remaining ones were eradicated by biologists in 1923, the ducks began to recover, increasing to a population of about 500 individuals by the 1950s. Congress passed the Endangered Species Preservation Act in 1966, and in 1967 the Laysan duck was declared an endangered species with federal protection. However, population bottlenecks occurred, such as the severe 1993 El Niño drought and food shortage, which reduced the number of ducks to about 100. Today, breeding and survival of the birds is closely tracked. Since 1998, a sample of birds have been fitted with unique leg bands or radio transmitters for monitoring reproductive success and survival, revealing that typically only 30% of ducklings on Laysan Island survive to fledge. In 2004, the population grew to an estimated 576 ducks.

In October 2004 and 2005, 42 Laysan ducks were translocated to Midway Atoll National Wildlife Refuge as a collaborative effort between the United States Geological Survey and Fish and Wildlife Service to establish a second population of ducks in the wild. The creation of a second population, since disaster is unlikely to strike both atolls simultaneously, reduces the risk of extinction by random catastrophes such as drought, hurricanes, tsunamis, disease outbreaks (like avian influenza), and accidental introductions of non-native plants and animals.

The second "insurance population" of Laysan ducks on Midway has grown quickly, more than doubling in size within the first two years. As of January 2007, 100 ducks called Midway's Sand and Eastern Islands home. Researchers monitoring the Midway population found that the ducks were breeding at an earlier age, and laying more eggs than birds on Laysan. This suggests that the abundant habitat and food available on Midway stimulated greater reproductive effort in the ducks, which contributes optimism for the success of this re-introduced population.

=== Future outlook ===
The persistence of the Laysan duck into the future seems likely at present, though threats to the population remain. Threats include the introduction of non-native species, which may change vital rates, displace native species and adversely affect nesting and foraging opportunities. Devastation to vegetation could increase sedimentation of the lakes and seeps that serve as important foraging habitat. Human disturbance may impact nesting and brooding, and landing permits to the Laysan Island refuge are granted only for official or scientific purposes. Debris and contaminants washed ashore by ocean currents could pose a serious threat to the duck. Pesticide containers and oil spills have contaminated Laysan in the past. The island homes of the duck are especially vulnerable to a rise in sea level and extreme weather associated with global warming. Even a slight rise in sea level would destroy a large portion of the duck's current habitat. The spread of parasites such as the nematode Echinuria uncinata could be extremely pathogenic, as well as the introduction of disease by migratory waterfowl along the Pacific Flyway (such as avian influenza, avian malaria, cholera, botulism and duck plague). Environmental catastrophes such as drought, severe storms, and tsunamis may decimate populations. Sea level rise and increased frequency and severity of storms are an anticipated effect of global warming and could affect the population of the Laysan duck.

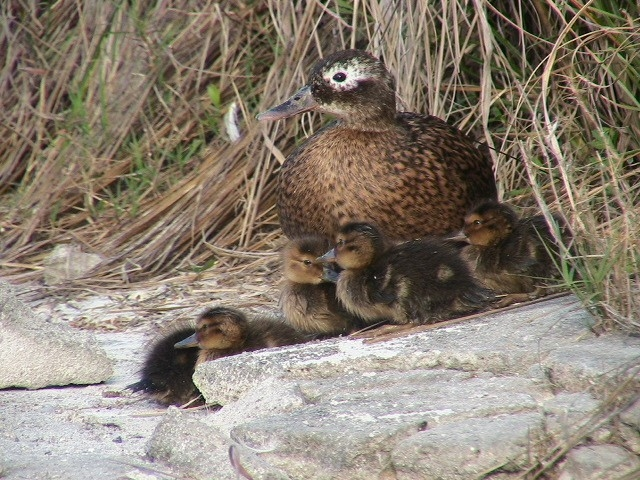
Laysan duck brood

A recovery plan for the Laysan duck has been developed by the U.S. Fish and Wildlife Service. The goal of the recovery program is to conserve and recover the species to the extent that it may be down-listed from endangered to threatened in the near future, and ultimately, that the population be healthy enough to no longer require federal protection under the Endangered Species Act. The emphasis of the recovery plan is the distribution of additional viable populations in the Laysan duck's historical and prehistorical range. The creation of multiple populations will decrease the risk that catastrophic events will result in species extinction. The increase of population size will diminish the threats from demographic and environmental uncertainties. To achieve this goal, biologists plan to establish at least five populations on a combination of predator-free Northwestern Hawaiian Islands and predator-controlled sites on Main Hawaiian Islands. This plan includes wild translocation and the establishment of a successful captive or semi-captive breeding program using wild source eggs for reintroductions to the Main Hawaiian Islands. Additionally, the plan calls for achieving gene flow between the wild source populations through long-term inter-island translocations, and island-specific management for each population to reduce threats and improve quality of habitat. As basic criteria of the recovery plan were met, the Laysan duck was down-listed from endangered to threatened after 2019. NatureServe considers the species Critically Imperiled.

== In popular culture ==
In 2023 the Laysan teal was featured on a United States Postal Service Forever stamp as part of the Endangered Species set, based on a photograph from Joel Sartore's Photo Ark. The stamp was dedicated at a ceremony at the National Grasslands Visitor Center in Wall, South Dakota.
