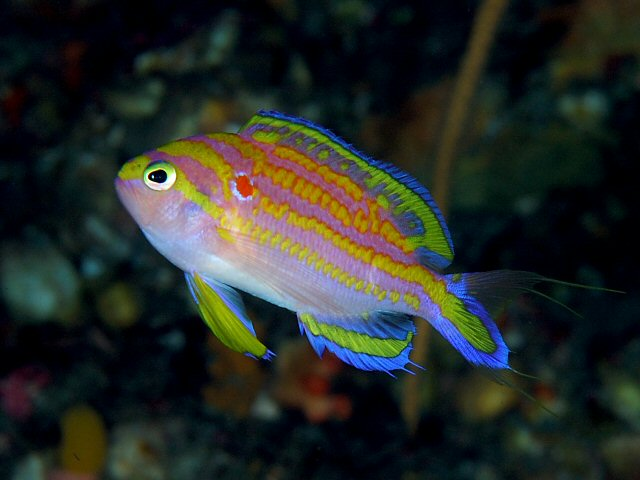
- Tosanoides flavofasciatus

Scientific classification
- Kingdom: Animalia
- Phylum: Chordata
- Class: Actinopterygii
- Order: Perciformes
- Family: Anthiadidae
- Genus: Tosanoides; Kamohara, 1953

Type species
- Tosanoides filamentosus Kamohara, 1953

= Tosanoides =

Genus of ray-finned fishes

Tosanoides is a genus of marine ray-finned fish in the family Anthiadidae. They are found in the Atlantic and Pacific oceans.

== Species ==
There are currently six recognized species in this genus:

- Tosanoides annepatrice Pyle, Greene, Copus & Randall, 2018
- Tosanoides aphrodite Pinheiro, C. R. Rocha & L. A. Rocha, 2018 (Aphrodite anthias)
- Tosanoides bennetti Allen & F. Walsh, 2019 (Live specimens were for the first time filmed during a 2020 research project in the Coral Sea by Australian scientists.)
- Tosanoides filamentosus Kamohara, 1953
- Tosanoides flavofasciatus Katayama & Masuda, 1980
- Tosanoides obama Pyle, Greene & Kosaki, 2016
