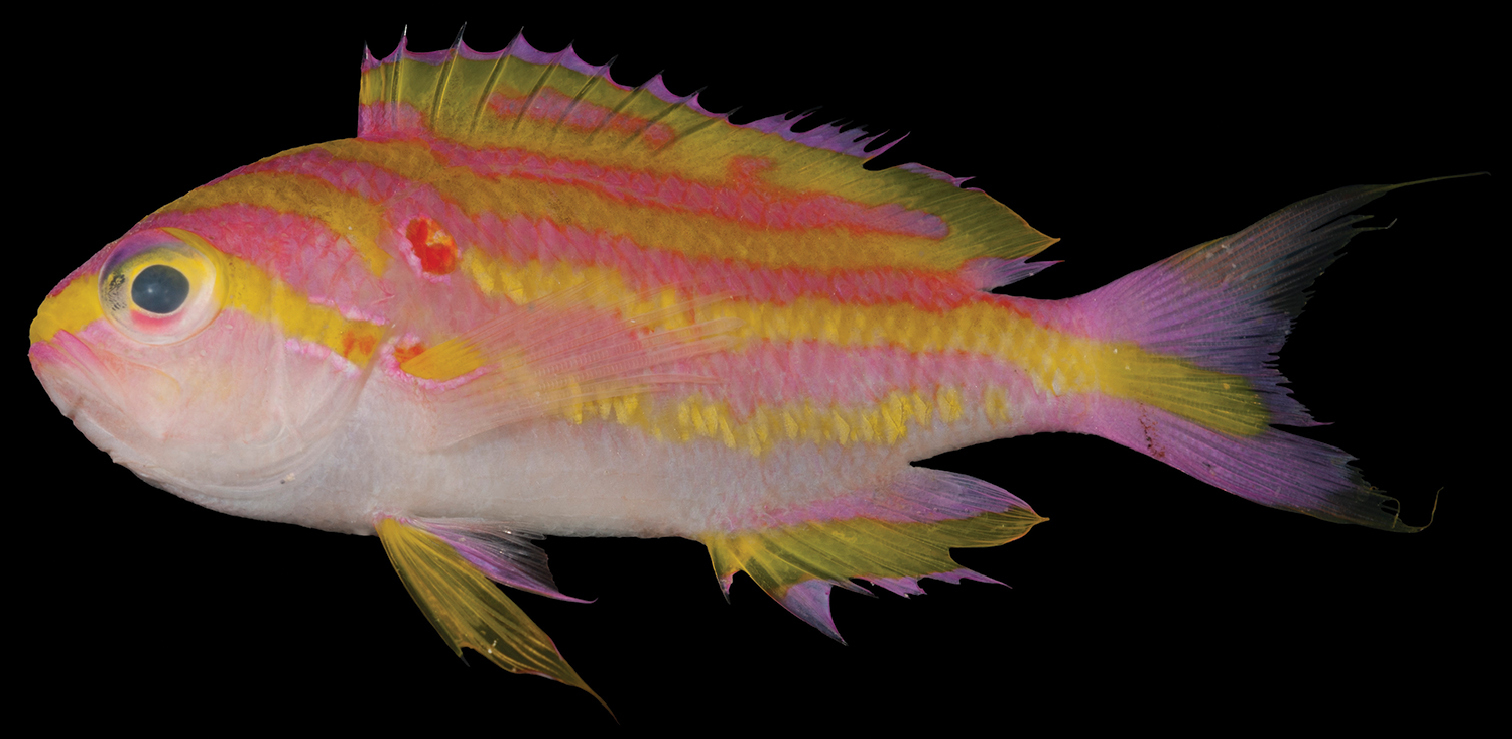

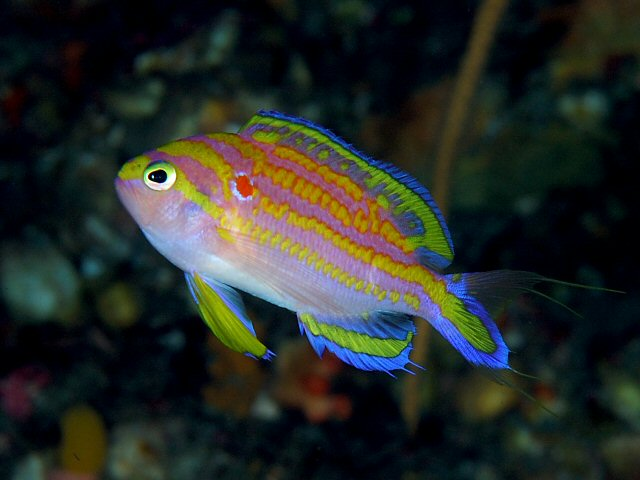

Scientific classification
- Domain: Eukaryota
- Kingdom: Animalia
- Phylum: Chordata
- Class: Actinopterygii
- Order: Perciformes
- Family: Anthiadidae
- Genus: Tosanoides
- Species: T. flavofasciatus

Binomial name
- Tosanoides flavofasciatus Katayama & Masuda, 1980

= Tosanoides flavofasciatus =

Species of ray-finned fish

Tosanoides flavofasciatus (Japanese: キシマハナダイ) is a species of reef fish native to the Pacific Ocean, specifically Sagami Bay and the Tonga-Kermadec Ridge. The males of the species can grow up to 9 centimeters while the females can grow up to 6 centimeters. It can found in depths of 40 to 50 meters.
