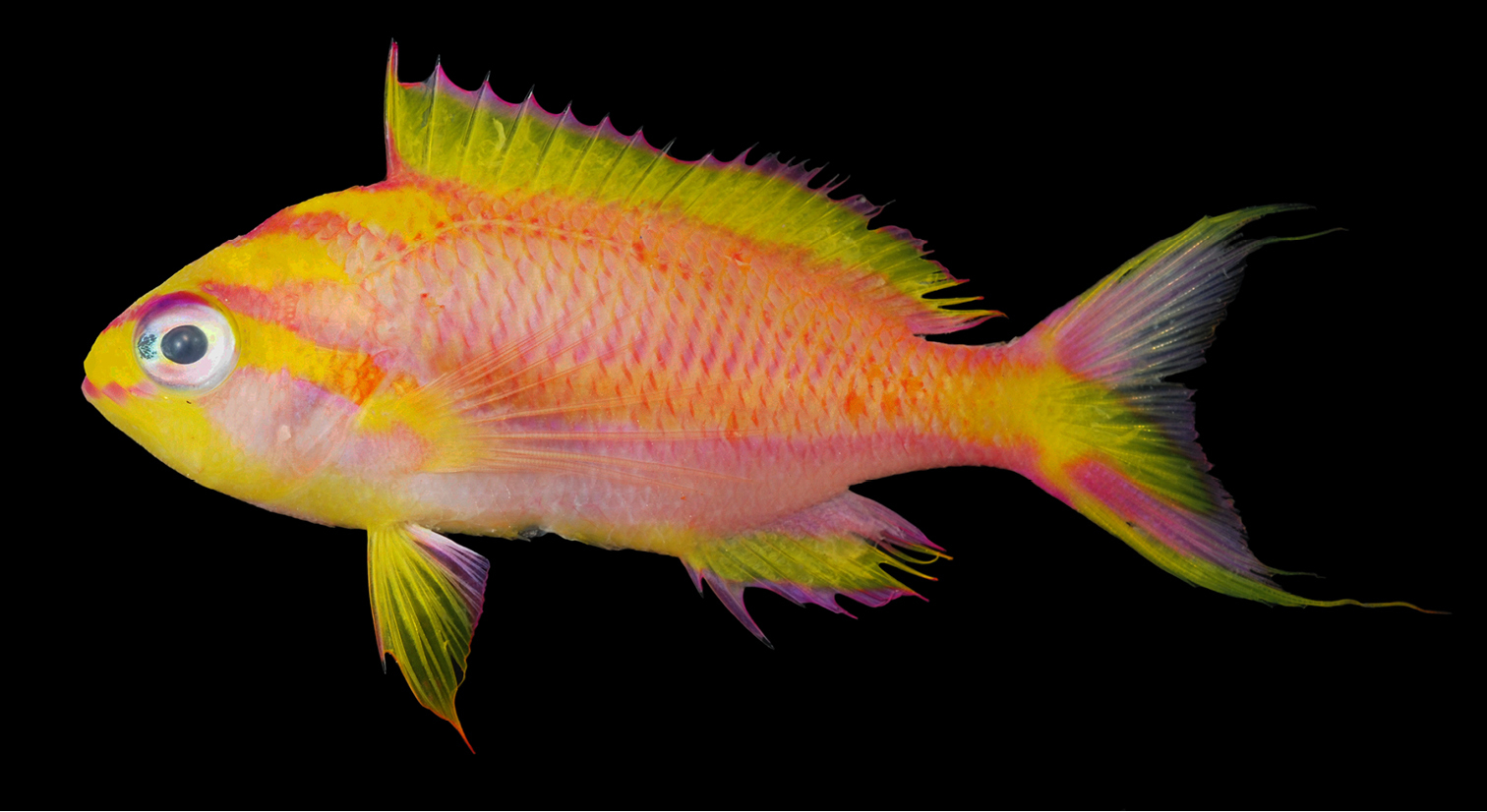

Scientific classification
- Kingdom: Animalia
- Phylum: Chordata
- Class: Actinopterygii
- Order: Perciformes
- Family: Anthiadidae
- Genus: Tosanoides
- Species: T. annepatrice

Binomial name
- Tosanoides annepatrice Pyle, Greene, Copus & Randall, 2018

= Tosanoides annepatrice =

Species of ray-finned fish

Tosanoides annepatrice is a species of reef fish in the family Anthiadidae. It is native to the western Pacific Ocean around Palau and Micronesia and can be found in depths of 115–150 meters.

== Etymology ==
The fish is named in honor of Anne Patrice Greene, the second author's mother.

== Description ==
Tosanoides annepatrice reaches a standard length of 6.9 centimeters.
