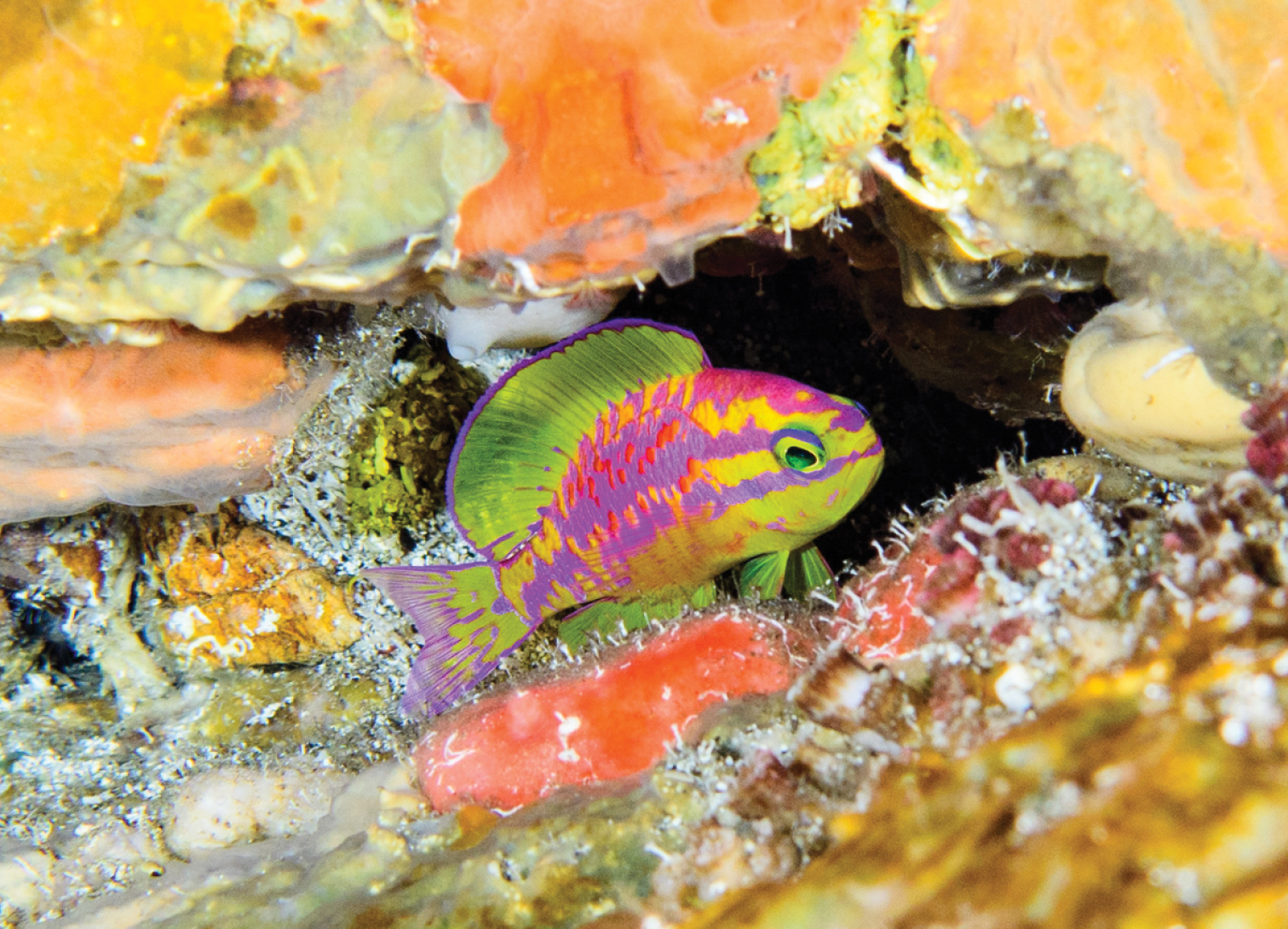

Scientific classification
- Kingdom: Animalia
- Phylum: Chordata
- Class: Actinopterygii
- Order: Perciformes
- Family: Anthiadidae
- Genus: Tosanoides
- Species: T. aphrodite

Binomial name
- Tosanoides aphrodite Pinheiro, C. R. Rocha & L. A. Rocha 2018

= Tosanoides aphrodite =

Species of ray-finned fish

Tosanoides aphrodite, the Aphrodite anthias, is a species of marine ray-finned fish, from the family Anthiadidae. It was discovered in the Atlantic Ocean in 2018, the only one in its genus to be discovered there. It was first identified by Luiz A. Rocha and Hudson Pinheiro, staff members of the California Academy of Sciences. The fish is electric pink and yellow and has bright green fins. It was discovered on a remote Brazilian archipelago in the Atlantic Ocean and can be distinguished by 15-16 soft dorsal fin rays and 9 anal fin rays. They are sexually dichromatic, meaning the males and females are different colors. It is named after Aphrodite, the Greek goddess of love and beauty.

This species was found on mesophotic coral ecosystems of the Saint Paul's Rocks. They like to live in small spaces in rocky reefs. Also, they tend to live in areas between 13 and 15 degrees Celsius (55.4 to 59 degrees Fahrenheit). Along with differences in body proportions, morphology of rays, distribution separates this genus from others that have previously existed.
