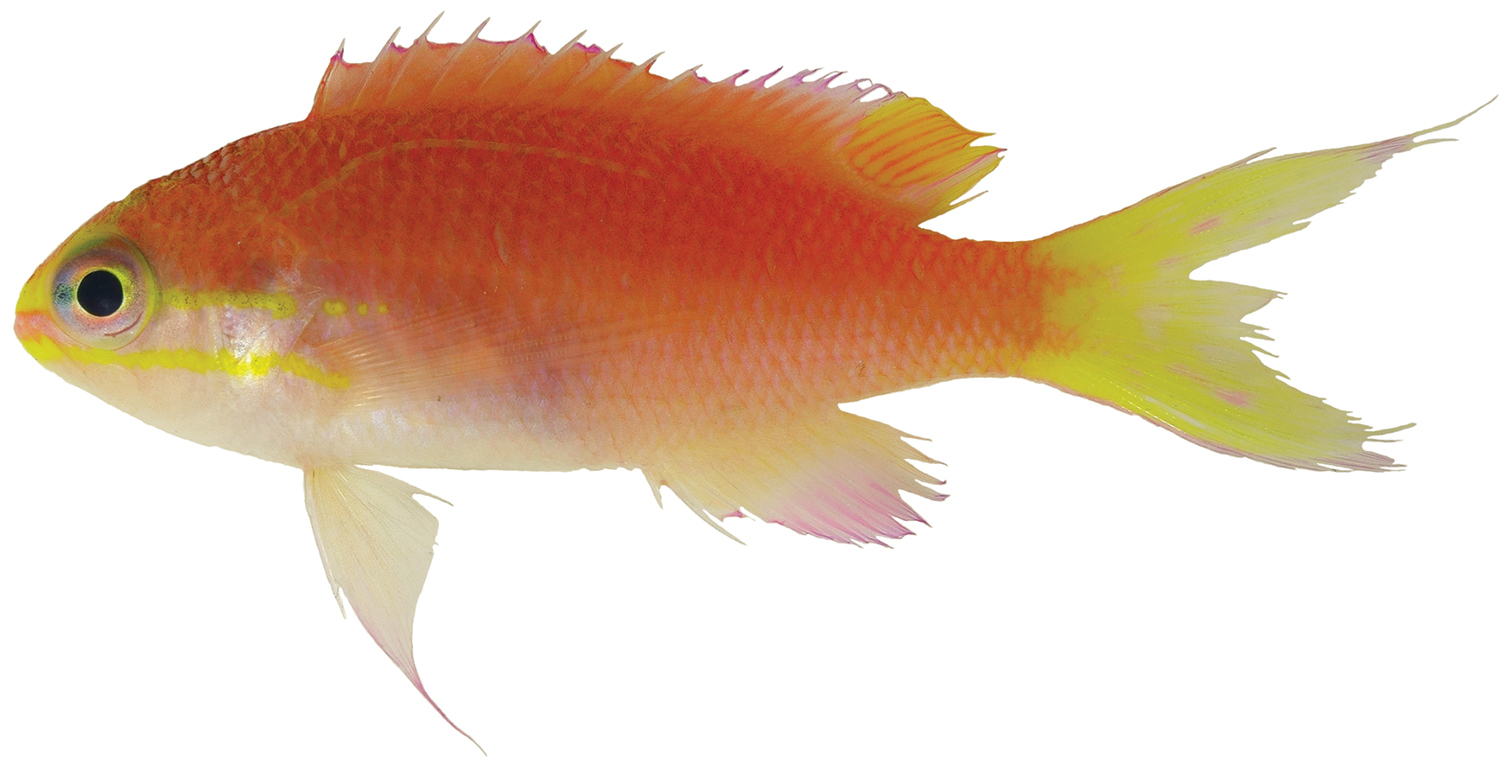

Scientific classification
- Kingdom: Animalia
- Phylum: Chordata
- Class: Actinopterygii
- Order: Perciformes
- Family: Anthiadidae
- Genus: Tosanoides
- Species: T. obama

Binomial name
- Tosanoides obama Pyle, Greene & Kosaki, 2016

= Tosanoides obama =

Species of ray-finned fish

Tosanoides obama, Obama's basslet, is a coral reef fish species from the family Anthiadidae. It was discovered in Papahānaumokuākea Marine National Monument, Hawaii. Tosanoides obama was named after former US President Barack Obama in honor of his efforts to preserve natural environments including expanding the Papahānaumokuākea Marine National Monument. It was first discovered and described by Richard Pyle, Brian Greene and Randall Kosaki in December 2016. They also noted a distinctive spot on the male's dorsal fin reminiscent of Obama's campaign logo. The fish live in small groups in holes in reefs at a depth of around 90 m. Following the discovery the size of the reserve was increased. This fish also looks like damselfishes, not to be confused.

Tosanoides obama is one of six species in the genus Tosanoides.

== See also ==
- List of things named after Barack Obama
- List of organisms named after famous people (born 1950–1974)
