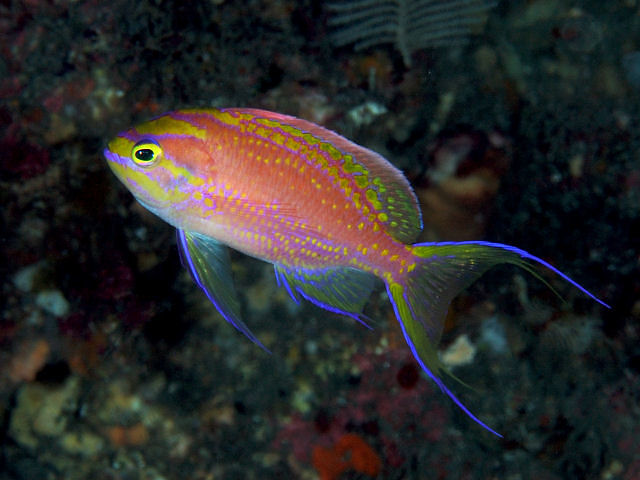

Scientific classification
- Kingdom: Animalia
- Phylum: Chordata
- Class: Actinopterygii
- Order: Perciformes
- Family: Anthiadidae
- Genus: Tosanoides
- Species: T. filamentosus

Binomial name
- Tosanoides filamentosus Kamohara, 1953

= Tosanoides filamentosus =

Species of ray-finned fish

Tosanoides filamentosus is a species of reef fish from the family Anthiadidae. native to the northwest Pacific Ocean around Japan and can be found in depths of 50–60 meters. Tosanoides filamentosus is one of six species that make up the genus Tosanoides and it is the type species of that genus.

== Description ==
It is around 10 centimeters long.
