= Tosanoides bennetti =

Scientific classification
- Kingdom: Animalia
- Phylum: Chordata
- Class: Actinopterygii
- Order: Perciformes
- Family: Anthiadidae
- Genus: Tosanoides
- Species: T. bennetti

Binomial name
- Tosanoides bennetti Allen & F. Walsh, 2019

Species of ray-finned fish

Tosanoides bennetti is a species of reef fish in the family Anthiadidae. It is known only from the Coral Sea and can be found in depths of 141–150 meters.

== Etymology ==
The fish is named honour of Timothy Bennett (b. 1960), an Australian diver and a fish collector for the marine aquarium trade, who captured the type specimen with a handnet.

== Description ==
Tosanoides bennetti reaches a standard length of 4.9 cm.
