= Randall K. Kosaki =

American research ecologist

- Education: Occidental College, BA Marine Biology; University of Hawaii at Manoa, MS and PhD Zoology
- Occupation: Retired
- Scientific career
- Workplaces: Papahānaumokuākea Marine National Monument, (NOAA); University of Hawaiʻi
- Website: www.researchgate.net/profile/Randall-Kosaki

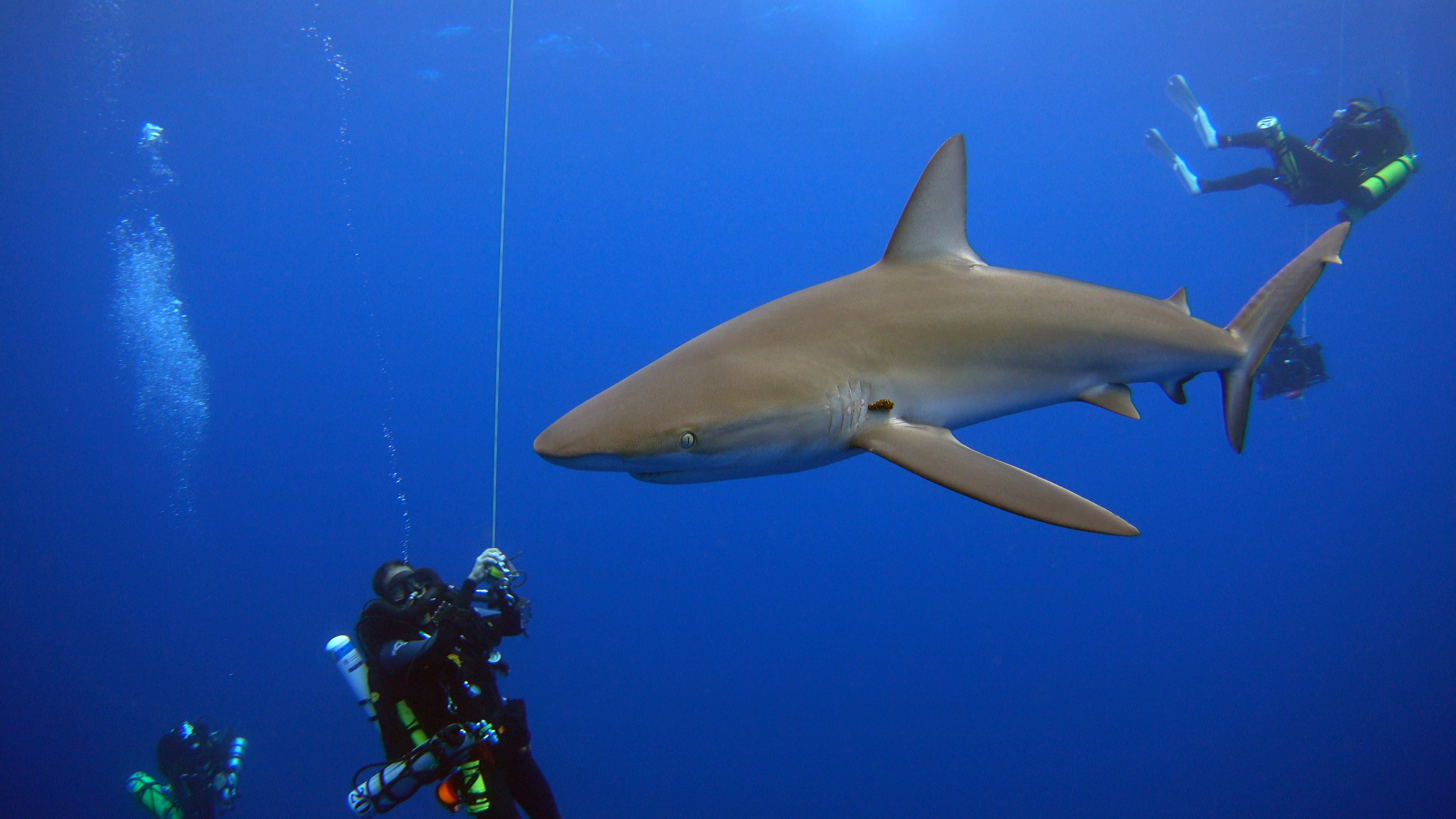
Kosaki being approached by a Galapagos shark at PMNM

Randall Kosaki is a retired research ecologist from the NOAA Papahānaumokuākea Marine National Monument. His expertise is in the behavioral ecology, taxonomy, and biogeography of Pacific coral reef fishes.

== Early life ==
Kosaki was adopted at birth by two university professors. In 2007, Kosaki reconnected with his biological mother, June Werner and learned he has a half-sister, Kimi Werner, also an avid and accomplished diver. A short film, "Three Hearts Home with Kimi Werner", highlights the three uniting.

== Education ==
Kosaki received his Bachelor's of Arts degree with a focus on marine biology in 1985 at Occidental College in Los Angeles. He attended the University of Hawaii at Manoa where he earned his Master of Science in zoology in 1996 and his Ph.D. in zoology in 1999, the latter with a focus on behavioral ecology of coral reef fishes.

== Career ==
=== University of Hawaii ===
Kosaki worked as an aquarist at the Waikiki Aquarium (1985-1987). While working towards his master's degree (1987-1990), he was a research assistant for the department of zoology at the University of Hawaiʻi at Manoa. He worked as a teaching assistant (1994-1990) for the department of zoology and as a research assistant at the Hawaiʻi Institute of Marine Biology(1995-1996) while earning his Ph.D. in zoology.

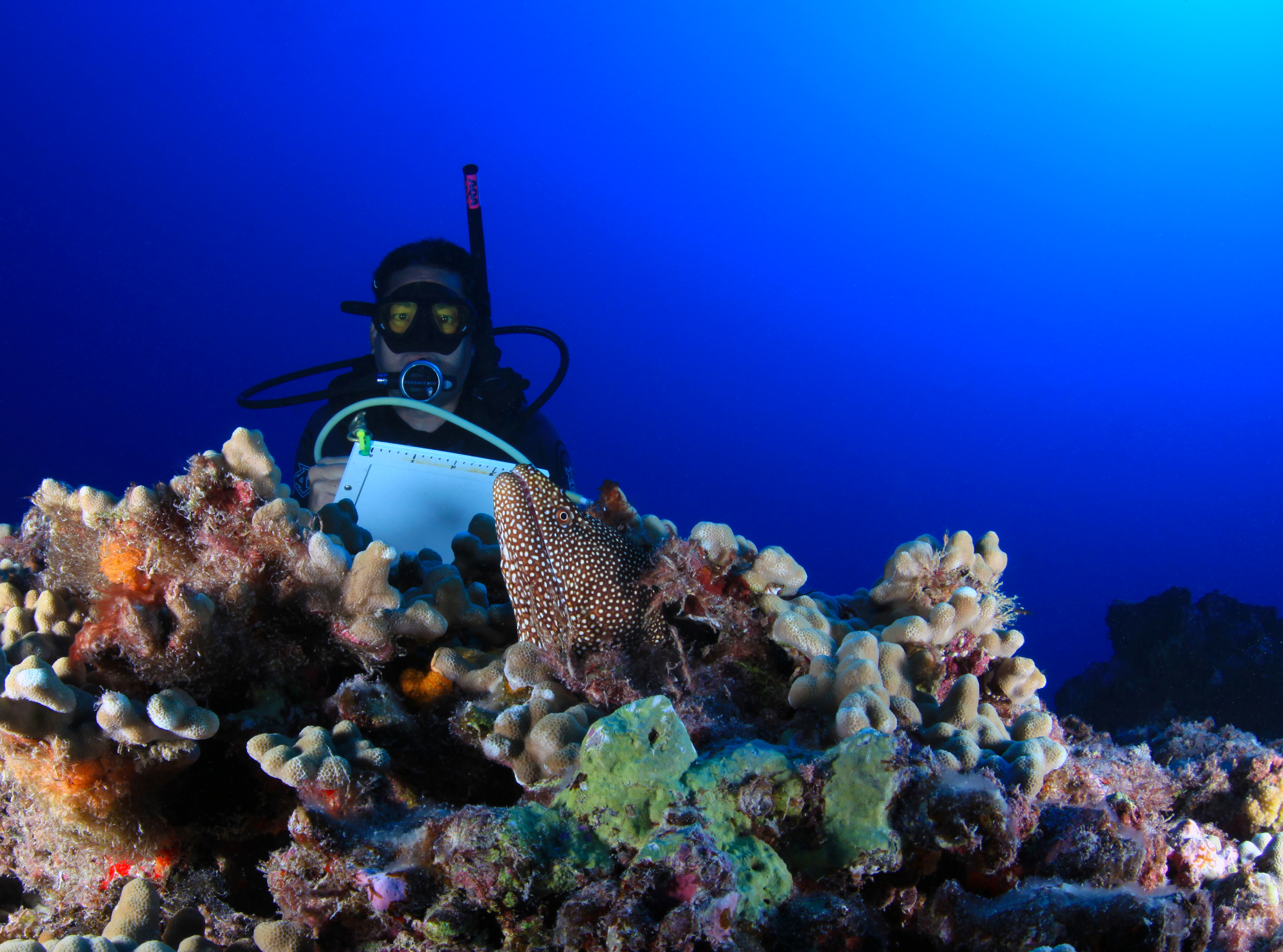
Kosaki with a spotted moray eel at Maro Reef.

Soon after earning his Ph.D., Randall worked as a lecturer at the University of Hawaii at Hilo (2000-2002) in the Department of Marine Science. Kosaki still holds affiliate faculty appointments in the Tropical Conservation Biology and Environmental Science program at the University of Hawaii at Hilo, the Marine Biology Graduate Program at the University of Hawaii at Manoa, and at Texas A&M Corpus Christi.

=== National Oceanic & Atmospheric Administration ===
Randall Kosaki worked with the National Oceanic & Atmospheric Administration (NOAA) for over 20 years. From October 2002 to March 2008, Kosaki was Research Coordinator for the Northwestern Hawaiian Islands Coral Reef Ecosystem Reserve. He became Deputy Superintendent of the Papahānaumokuākea Marine National Monument (PMNM) from March 2008 to January 2020 and Research Coordinator from January 2020 to July 2021. He retired from being the Research Ecologist for PMNM in February 2025.

=== New Species ===
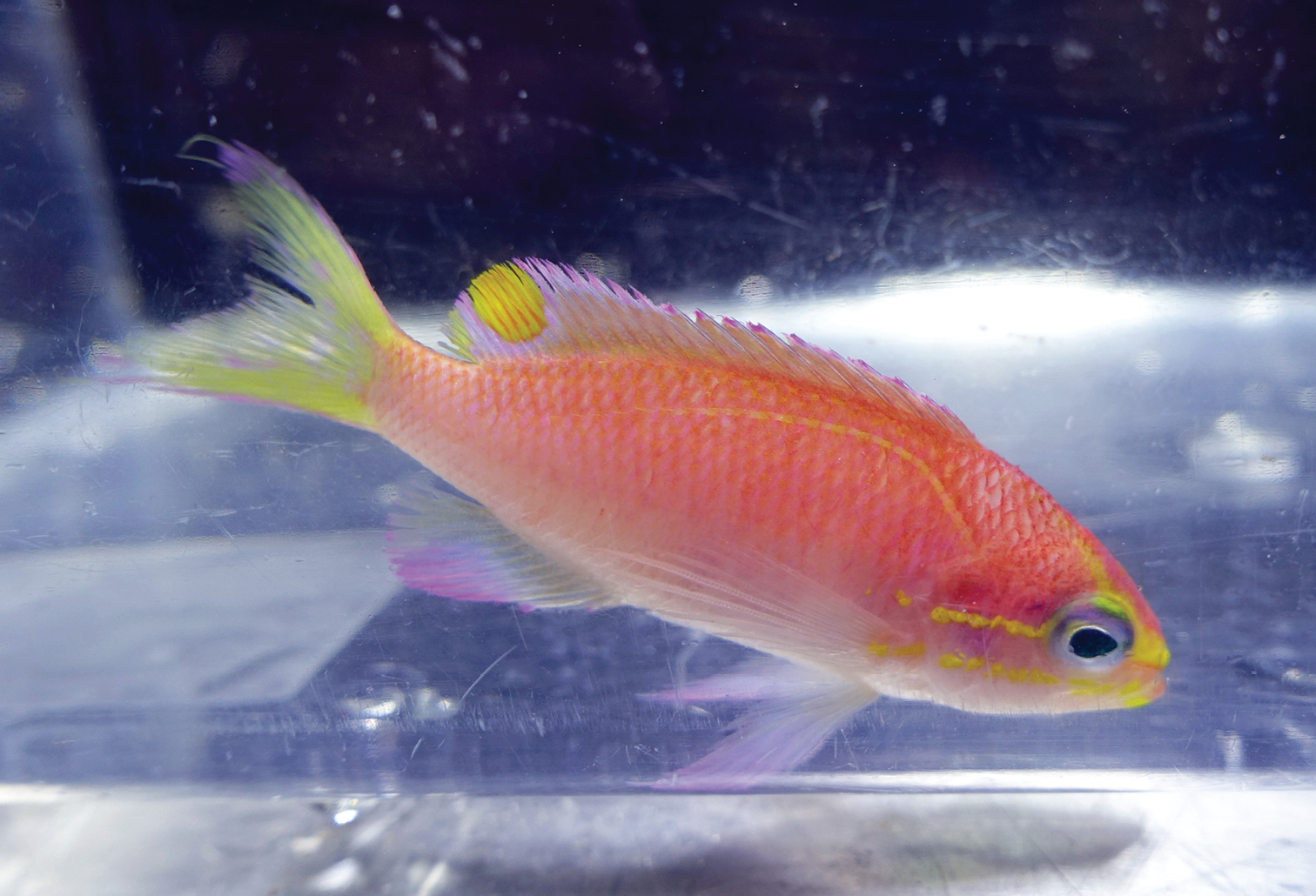
Tosanoides obama in a holding tank on NOAA ship Hi'ialakai after collection.

Kosaki specialized in the use of advanced dive technology, such as closed-circuit rebreathers, that allow him to explore the mesophotic zone (150–330 ft. depths). Kosaki was involved in finding a new invasive algae species, Chondria tumulosa, at Papahānaumokuākea Marine National Monument in 2016.

In June 2016, Kosaki was part of the group of scientists that discovered a new butterflyfish species at Kure Atoll in the PMNM. This new species was named Tosanoides obama after former President Barack Obama for his contribution in expanding the PMNM that same year.

Kosaki was the first to discover a new algae species, Croisettea kalaukapuae, during a 280-foot dive in the Northwestern Hawaiian Islands. Kosaki and his dive team have discovered over 20 new species of algae, many of which have been given formal scientific epithets (species names) in the Hawaiian language.

== Publications ==
Kosaki has contributed to 72 peer-reviewed publications.

- Couch, C. S., Burns, J. H. R., Liu, G., Steward, K., Gutlay, T. N., Kenyon, J., Eakin, C. M., & Kosaki, R. K. (2017, September 27). Mass coral bleaching due to unprecedented marine heatwave in Papahānaumokuākea Marine National Monument (Northwestern Hawaiian Islands). PLoS ONE. https://journals.plos.org/plosone/article?id=10.1371%2Fjournal.pone.0185121
- Kosaki, R.K., Pyle, R.L., Leonard, J.C. et al. 100% endemism in mesophotic reef fish assemblages at Kure Atoll, Hawaiian Islands. Mar Biodiv 47, 783–784 (2017). https://doi.org/10.1007/s12526-016-0510-5
- Papastamatiou, Y. P., Meyer, C. G., Kosaki, R. K., Wallsgrove, N. J., & Popp, B. N. (2015, February 17). Movements and foraging of predators associated with mesophotic coral reefs and their potential for linking ecological habitats. https://doi.org/10.3354/meps11110
- Pyle, R. L., & Kosaki, R. K. (2016, September 6). Prognathodes basabei, a new species of butterflyfish (Perciformes, Chaetodontidae) from the Hawaiian Archipelago. ZooKeys. https://doi.org/10.3897/zookeys.614.10200
- Sherwood, A. R., Huisman, J. M., Paiano, M. O., Williams, T. M., Kosaki, R. K., Smith, C. M., Giuseffi, L., & Spalding, H. L. (2020). Taxonomic determination of the cryptogenic red alga, Chondria tumulosa sp. nov., (Rhodomelaceae, Rhodophyta) from Papahānaumokuākea Marine National Monument, Hawaiʻi, US: A new species displaying invasive characteristics. PLoS ONE, 15(7). https://doi.org/10.1371/journal.pone.0234358

== Awards and recognition ==
1987 - Best Student Paper Award, Tester Memorial Symposium, University of Hawaii

1992 - Edward C. Raney Fund Award

2007 - United States Department of Commerce Gold Medal for Scientific/Engineering Achievement

2010 - University of Hawaiʻi Marine Option Program, Certificate of Recognition in Ocean Leadership

2017 - NOAA Administrator's Award

2024 - NOAA Administrator's Award
