= Papahānaumokuākea Marine National Monument =

US protected region of ocean and islands

- IUCN category Ia (strict nature reserve)
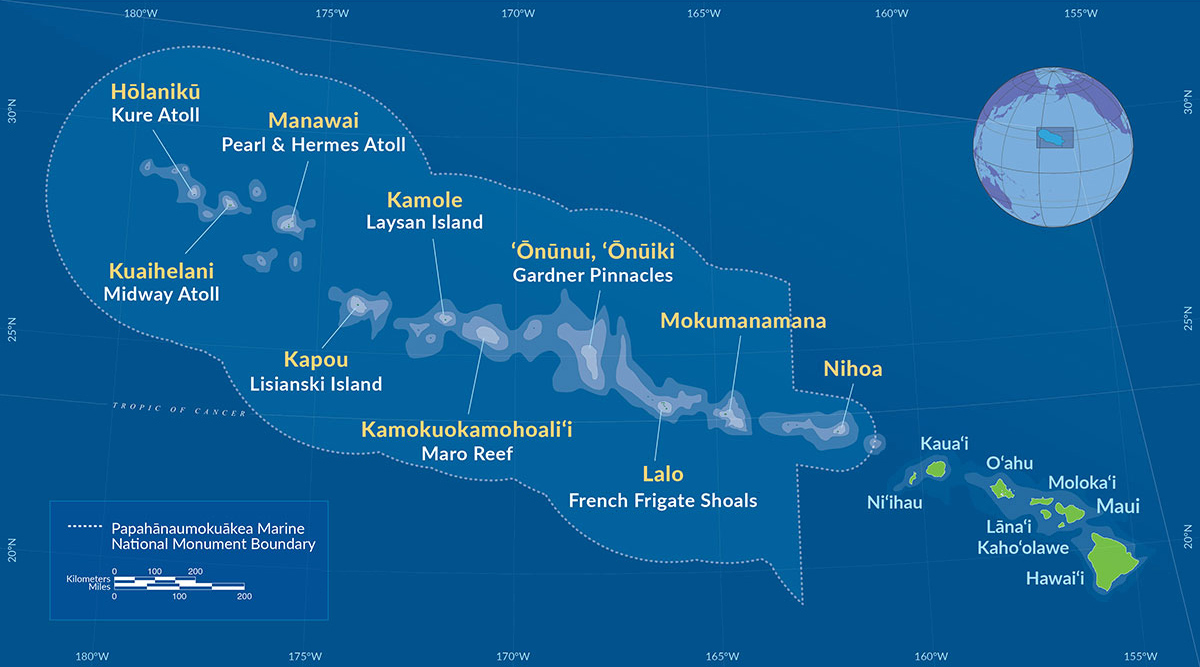
- August 2016 boundary and location

- Location within Pacific Ocean
- Location: Northwestern Hawaiian Islands, Hawaii; Midway Atoll, United States Minor Outlying Islands
- Coordinates: 25°30′N 170°30′W
- Area: 582,578 sq mi (1,508,870 km^{2})
- Established: June 15, 2006
- Governing body: NOAA; FWS; DLNR; OHA

UNESCO World Heritage Site
- Criteria: Mixed: iii, vi, viii, ix, x
- Inscription: 2010 (34th Session)

The Papahānaumokuākea Marine National Monument (pronounced [ˈpɐpəˈhaːnɐwˈmokuwaːˈkɛjə]; PMNM) is a U.S. national monument listed as a World Heritage Site, encompassing 582,578 square miles (1.5 million km^{2}) of ocean waters, including ten islands and atolls of the Northwestern Hawaiian Islands. It was first created by President George W. Bush in 2006 with an initial 140,000 square miles (360,000 km^{2}). President Barack Obama expanded the Monument in 2016, increasing its area more than fourfold by moving its border to the limit of the exclusive economic zone, making it one of the world's largest protected areas.

The Monument is home to more than 7,000 marine species, one quarter of which are endemic to the Hawaiian Islands, with some found only within the monument itself. Only 5.8 square miles (15 km^{2}) of land remains above sea level, but it provides critical habitat for many terrestrial species. It also features ancient archaeological sites important to Native Hawaiians. The deeper waters are of interest to maritime historians for containing shipwrecks, submerged aircraft, and the remains of those who died in battles during World War II. As a protected area, the monument is subject to a ban on commercial fishing. President Joe Biden designated the marine areas of the monument as the Papahānaumokuākea National Marine Sanctuary in 2025.

== Geography ==
The Monument protects a large area of the Pacific Ocean, including ocean waters, more than 30 submerged banks and seamounts, reefs, and ten islands and atolls of the Northwestern Hawaiian Islands. The boundary of the Monument begins offshore of the island of Nīhoa in the southeast, east of 163° W, closest to the southeastern, windward island of Niʻihau, just northwest of the island of Kauaʻi. From there, the Monument boundaries extend 1,200 miles northwest to Kure Atoll.

The marine boundary extends seaward to the limit of the exclusive economic zone (EEZ) for areas lying west of 163° W longitude. This extended boundary past Kure Atoll spans the International Date Line, making the protected waters continuous across the antimeridian. The full protected area covers approximately 582,578 square miles (1,508,870 km^{2}). The protected area is larger than all of America's national parks combined, and has almost the same surface area as the Gulf of Mexico.

About 132,000 square miles (340,000 km^{2}) of the Monument are part of the Northwestern Hawaiian Islands Coral Reef Ecosystem Reserve, designated in 2000. The Monument also includes the Midway Atoll National Wildlife Refuge (590,991.50 acres (2,391.7 km^{2})) and Battle of Midway National Memorial, the Hawaii State Seabird Sanctuary at Kure Atoll, and the Northwestern Hawaiian Islands State Marine Refuge.

The islands included in the Monument are all part of the state of Hawaii, except Midway Atoll, which is part of the United States Minor Outlying Islands insular area. Henderson Field, a public airport located on Midway Atoll, provides access to the Monument. Until the 2010s, French Frigate Shoals Airport on Tern Island was maintained as a runway. Although not officially decommissioned, the runway is now considered inactive. The Tern Island field station run by the Fish and Wildlife Service in the French Frigate Shoals was abandoned in 2012 after a severe storm destroyed its infrastructure. Hurricane Walaka destroyed the East Island in the shoals in 2018, but it has recently begun to restore itself.

== Administration ==
The Monument is jointly managed in partnership between four co-trustees: the Department of Commerce, the Department of the Interior, the State of Hawai‘i, and the Office of Hawaiian Affairs (OHA).

The marine areas are the responsibility of the Secretary of Commerce and the National Oceanic and Atmospheric Administration (NOAA). The area of the Midway Atoll National Wildlife Refuge, the Battle of Midway National Memorial, and the Hawaiian Islands National Wildlife Refuge is the responsibility of the Secretary of the Interior and the U.S. Fish and Wildlife Service (FWS). The Northwestern Hawaiian Islands Marine Refuge and State Seabird Sanctuary at Kure Atoll is the responsibility of the State of Hawaiʻi and the Hawaii Department of Land and Natural Resources (DLNR). Activities related to Native Hawaiian interests, customs, rights, practices, and religious traditions are the responsibility of the OHA.

Monument management is supplemented by policy administration developed by a Senior Executive Board. In addition, there is a seven-member management board composed of the Office of National Marine Sanctuaries and National Marine Fisheries Service within the NOAA; Ecological Services and Refuges within the FWS; Aquatic Resources and Forestry and Wildlife divisions within the DLNR; and the OHA.

== History ==
The Northwestern Hawaiian Islands (NWHI) are known for its cultural and natural values according to Native Hawaiians, who believe the area represents kinship between nature and humanity and that life begins and returns there after death. Archaeological remains have been found on Nīhoa and Mokumanamana in the area.

After the Hawaiian Islands were annexed by the United States and became a territory, the area was first protected by the federal government on February 3, 1909. In response to the over-harvesting of seabirds, and in recognition of the importance of the NWHI as seabird nesting sites, U.S. President Theodore Roosevelt created the Hawaiian Islands Bird Reservation through Executive Order 1019. President Franklin D. Roosevelt converted it into the Hawaiian Islands National Wildlife Refuge in 1940. A series of incremental protection expansions followed, leading to the establishment of Midway Atoll National Wildlife Refuge in 1988, and the Kure Atoll State Wildlife Sanctuary in 1993.

President Bill Clinton established the Northwestern Hawaiian Islands Coral Reef Ecosystem Reserve on December 4, 2000, with Executive Order 13178. Clinton's executive order initiated a process to designate the waters of the NWHI as a National Marine Sanctuary. In 2005, Governor of Hawaii Linda Lingle declared parts of the Monument a state marine refuge.

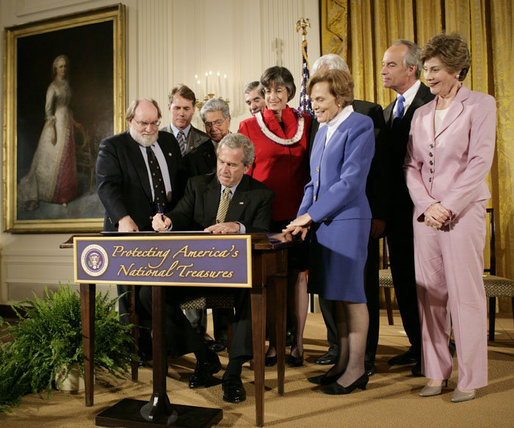
George W. Bush signing proclamation to establish the Monument on June 15, 2006

President George W. Bush and his wife viewed a screening of the documentary film Voyage to Kure in April 2006 at the White House along with its director, Jean-Michel Cousteau. Compelled by the film's portrayal of the flora and fauna, on June 15, 2006, Bush moved to quickly to expand protections, signing Proclamation 8031 which designated the waters of the Northwestern Hawaiian Islands a National Monument under the 1906 Antiquities Act. Using the Antiquities Act bypassed the normal year of consultations and halted the public input process and came just before the draft environmental impact statement for the proposed Northwestern Hawaiian Islands National Marine Sanctuary was to be published. This was the second use by Bush of the Antiquities Act, following the declaration of the African Burial Ground National Monument on Manhattan in February 2006.

The legislated process for stakeholder involvement in the planning and management of a marine protected area (MPA) had already taken five years of effort, but the abrupt establishment of the NWHI as a National Monument, rather than a Sanctuary, provided immediate and more resilient protection. The protection is revocable only by legislation.

President Bush amended Proclamation 8031 with Proclamation 8112, naming the Monument "Papahānaumokuākea" on February 28, 2007. The name is pronounced "Pa-pa-ha-now-mo-ku-ah-kay-uh" and alludes to the Hawaiian creation myth of the Islands. The name is composed of four separate Hawaiian words that refer to a singular deity, Papahānaumoku, a goddess and Earth Mother. The goddess is often simply referred to as "Papa". Within the larger name, "hanau" refers to giving birth, "moku" is translated as "islands", and "akea" refers to the expanse and extent of the islands. Hawaiian kumu hula Pualani Kanakaʻole Kanahele translates Papahānaumoku as "the deity of our ancestors who extends to the Northwestern Hawaiian Islands, the great expanse she gave birth to".

Bush announced his intention to submit the Monument for Particularly Sensitive Sea Area (PSSA) status on May 15, 2007, which would "alert mariners to exercise caution in the ecologically important, sensitive, and hazardous area they are entering". In October 2007, the Marine Environmental Protection Committee of the International Maritime Organization designated the Monument as a PSSA.

Co-trustees submitted an application for the Monument as a proposed candidate for a World Heritage Site in 2007. Dirk Kempthorn of the Secretary of the Interior added the Monument to the tentative list of U.S. candidates along with Mount Vernon in early 2008. After an internal review period, the Monument was officially nominated to UNESCO in 2009. The Monument was finally accepted after undergoing an 18-month review process and inscribed on the World Heritage List in 2010 as "Papahānaumokuākea" at the 34th Session of the World Heritage Committee in Brasília.

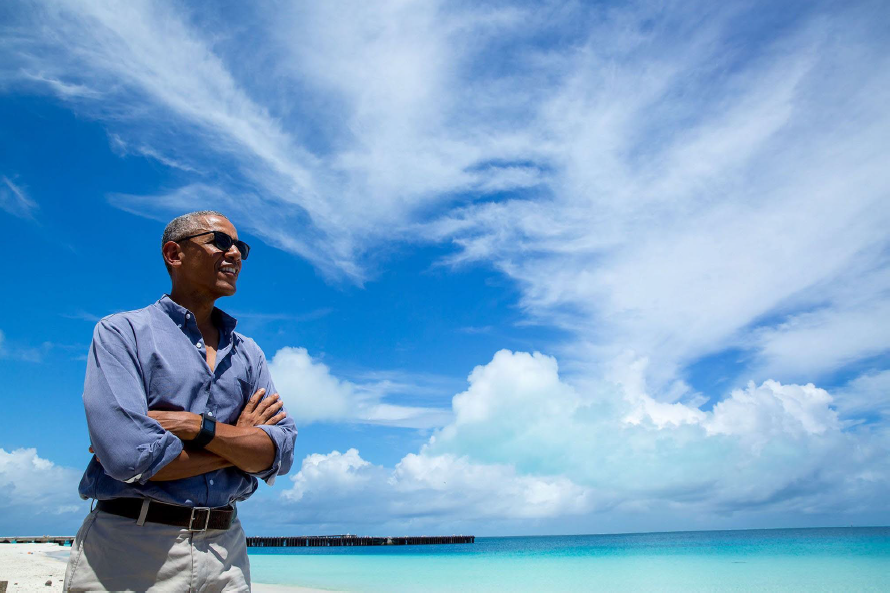
President Barack Obama visits Midway Atoll (2016).

President Barack Obama expanded the Monument's area by more than four times to the limits of the exclusive economic zone (EEZ) by signing Proclamation 9478 on August 26, 2016. The Monument grew from 139,797 square miles (362,073 km^{2}) to 582,578 square miles (1,508,870 km^{2}), extending west to −163° longitude, protecting ocean waters out to 200 nautical miles (370 km; 230 mi). It was at that time the world's largest MPA.

During the first Trump administration, Interior Secretary Ryan Zinke put the Monument's status under review.

The Biden administration first proposed designating the marine environment of the Monument as a national marine sanctuary in November 2021. President Joe Biden finalized the expansion of the protective ocean areas of the Monument as part of his "America the Beautiful" campaign. These portions of the Monument, from the shore of each island or atoll to 200 nautical miles (370 km; 230 mi) offshore, became the Papahānaumokuākea National Marine Sanctuary, the 18th national marine sanctuary in the United States, on January 15, 2025.

The Department of Government Efficiency (DOGE), acting under the authority of the second Trump administration in 2025, was responsible for firing thousands of scientists, some of whom managed the Monument. At the same time, the Federal Aviation Administration (FAA) gave SpaceX permission to use an area within 50 nautical miles (93 km; 58 mi) of the Monument as a containment zone for space debris from the Starship launch vehicle. In April, Trump issued Executive Order 10918, "Unleashing American Commercial Fishing in the Pacific", giving the green light to the Western Pacific Regional Fishery Management Council to open up commercial fishing in the Monument, an action strongly opposed by scientists, conservationists, and Native Hawaiians.

== Ecology ==
The Monument protects and supports 70% of the coral reefs found in the United States, amounting to approximately 3.5 million acres. The Monument is home to more than 7,000 marine species within its boundaries, one quarter of which are endemic. The limited areas of land found in the Monument hosts a diverse number of endemic plants, land birds, and invertebrates. In addition to these native species, 21 seabird and four migratory shorebird species are found here.

At least 27 endemic species of terrestrial plants are found in the Monument, five of which are endangered and are only known and managed in the area: a species of Laysan agrimony sandbur (Cenchrus agrimonioides var. laysanensis, possibly extinct), Hawaiʻi chaff flower (possibly extinct), Amaranthus brownii (possibly extinct), Nīhoa carnation, and a species of Laysan sedge (Cyperus pennatiformis var. bryanii). An additional 22 endemic species to the overall Hawaiian Archipelago are known to live in the Monument, four of which are endangered, with two currently managed as having principal populations in the Monument: a species of burr cucumber (Sicyos maximowiczii), and the endangered Pritchardia palm tree. Endemic invertebrate species include the Nīhoa conehead katydid, the Nihoa giant tree cricket, and the Nīhoa trapdoor spider.

Four endemic, endangered, and threatened land birds currently found only in the Monument include the Nihoa millerbird, Nihoa finch, Laysan duck, and the Laysan finch. Other prominent species include the endangered hawksbill sea turtle and the threatened green sea turtle, of which 95% rely on the French Frigate Shoals for nesting and breeding; the endangered Hawaiian monk seal, and seabirds such as the Laysan albatross.

An expedition to the Kure Atoll in 2010 sent divers to a depth of 250 feet (80 m), revealing new species of coral and other animals. Waikiki Aquarium cultured the new coral species. One of the largest sponges in the world was discovered in the Monument in 2015. A scientific expedition by the NOAAS Ship Okeanos Explorer found the sponge while using a remotely-operated vehicle. They were able to measure its size with lasers, loosely comparing it to that of a small mini-van at 3.5 × 2 × 1.5 meters. After taking samples, the team identified the sponge as a member of the Rossellidae family. Its age is undetermined, but it is presumably hundreds to possibly even thousands of years old. In 2019, a species of seaweed was discovered that was killing large patches of coral.

Benthic communities

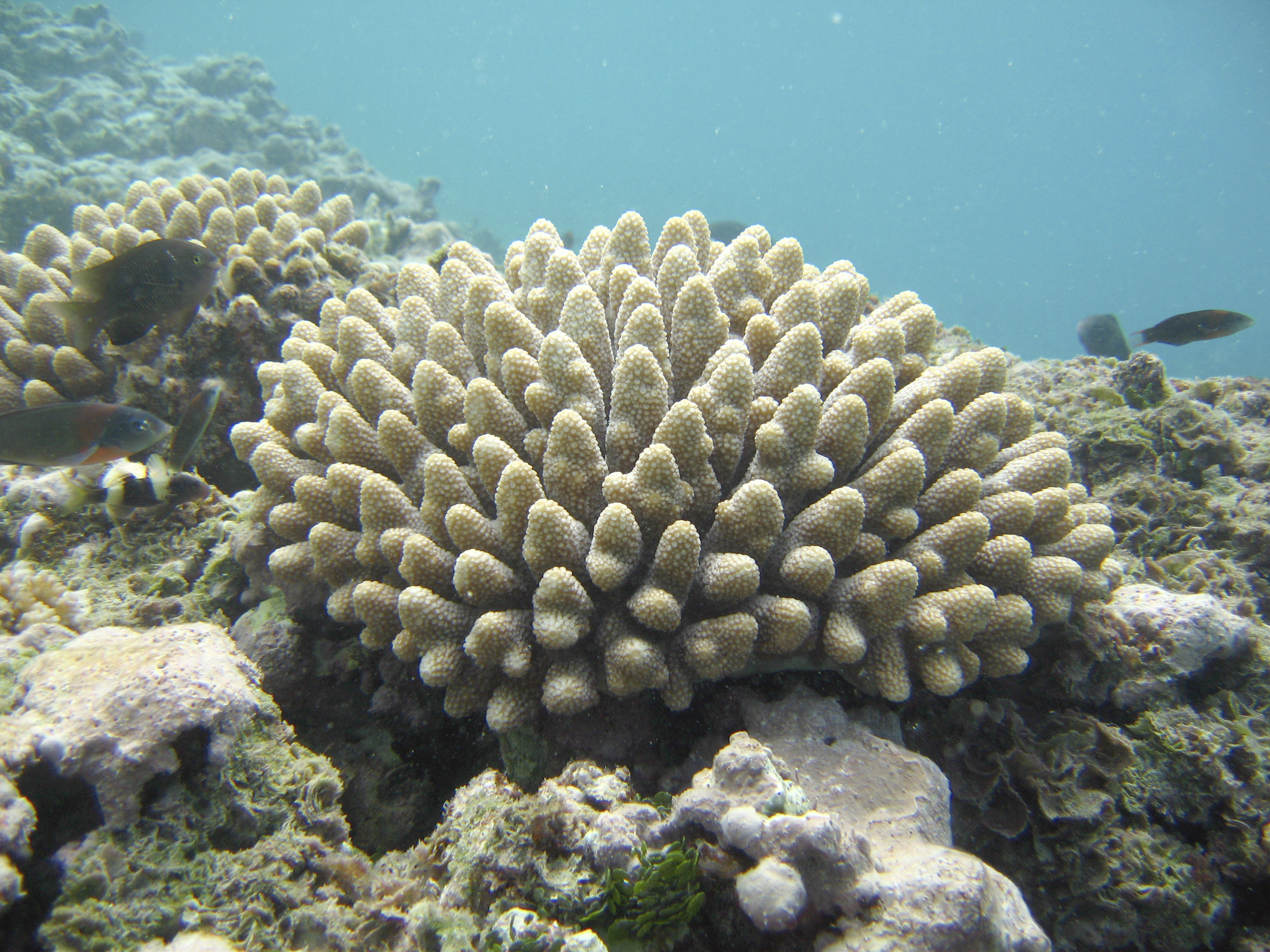

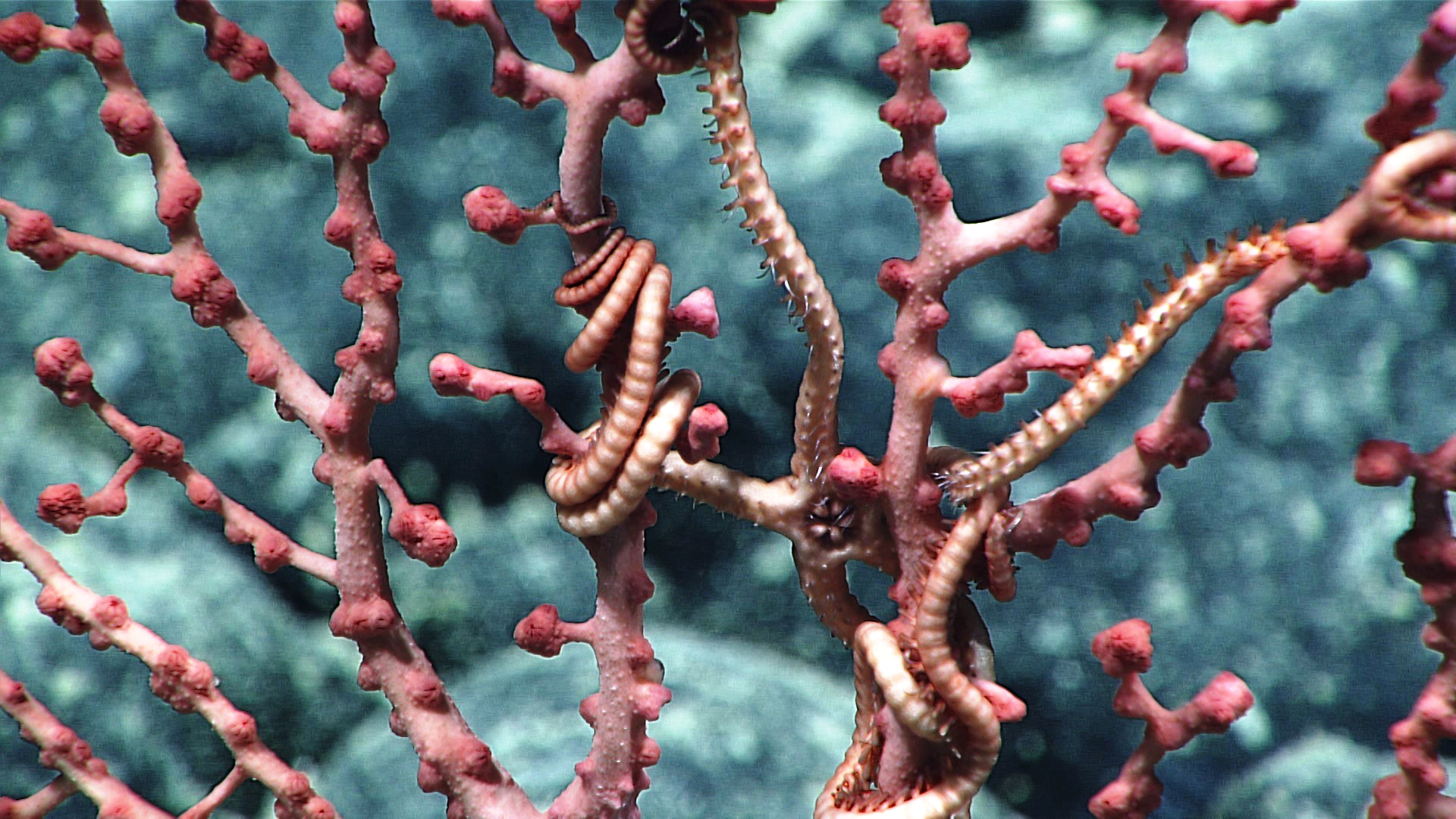
Bubblegum coral

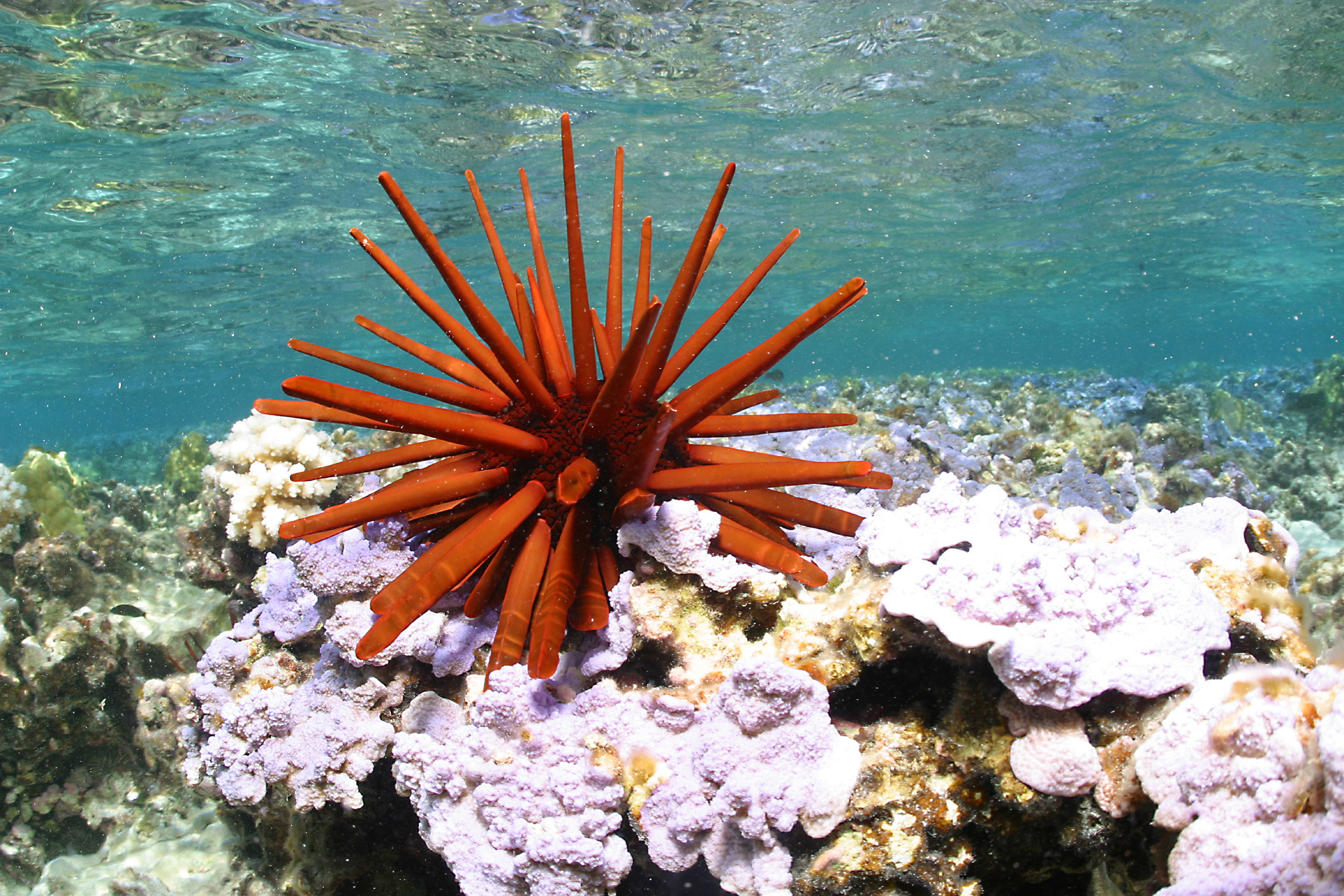
Red pencil urchin

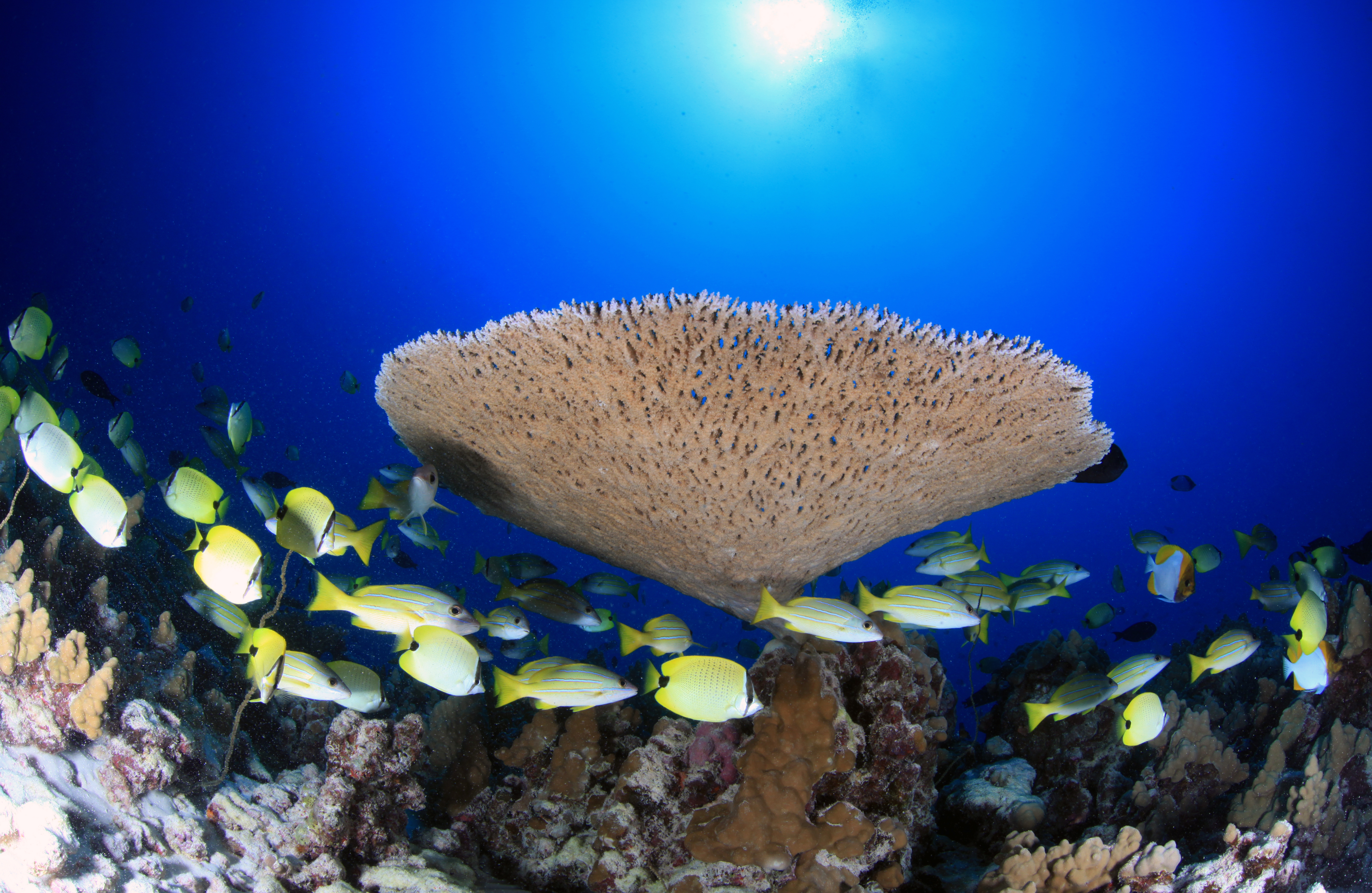
Fishes

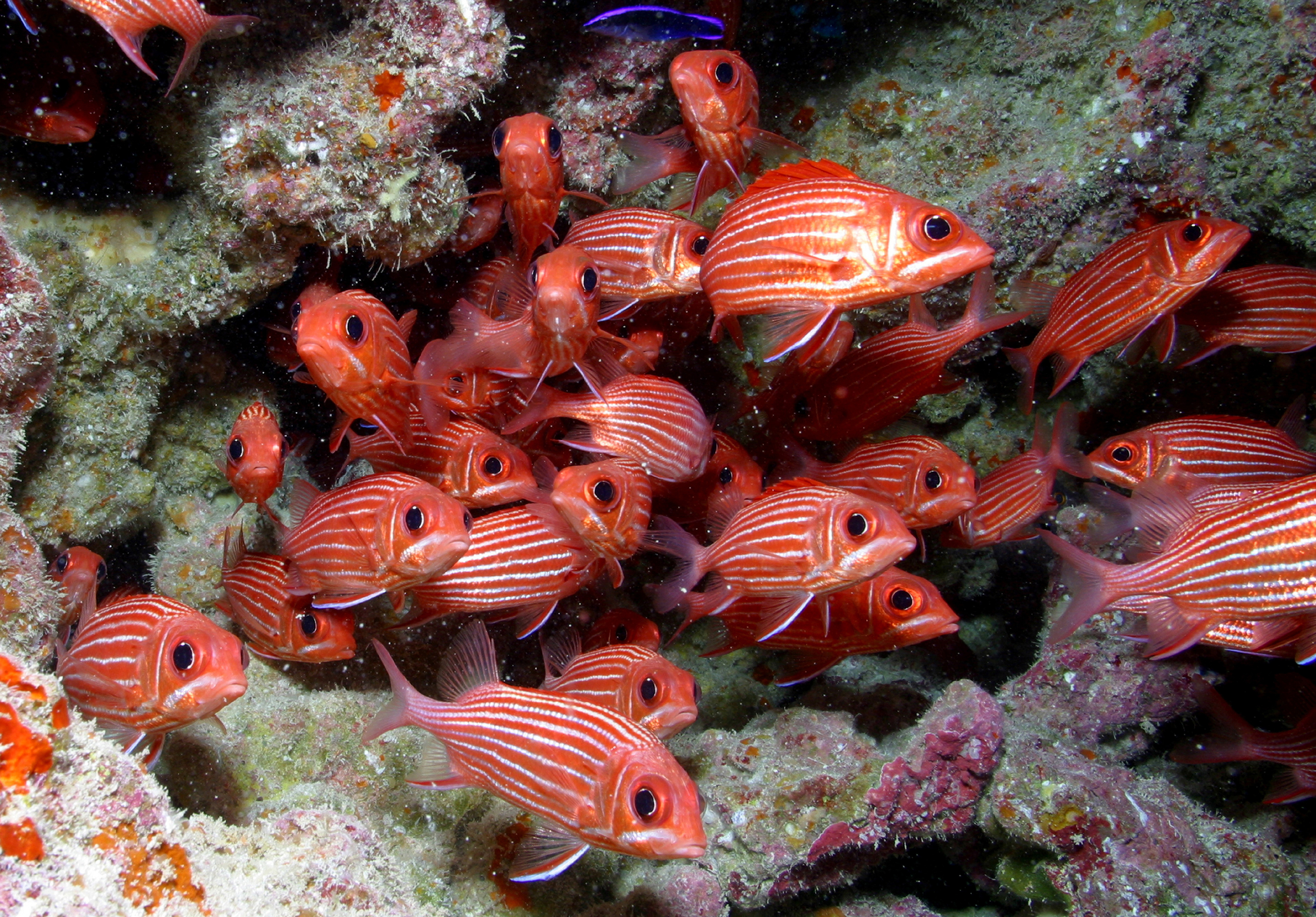
Hawaiian squirrelfish at French Frigate Shoals

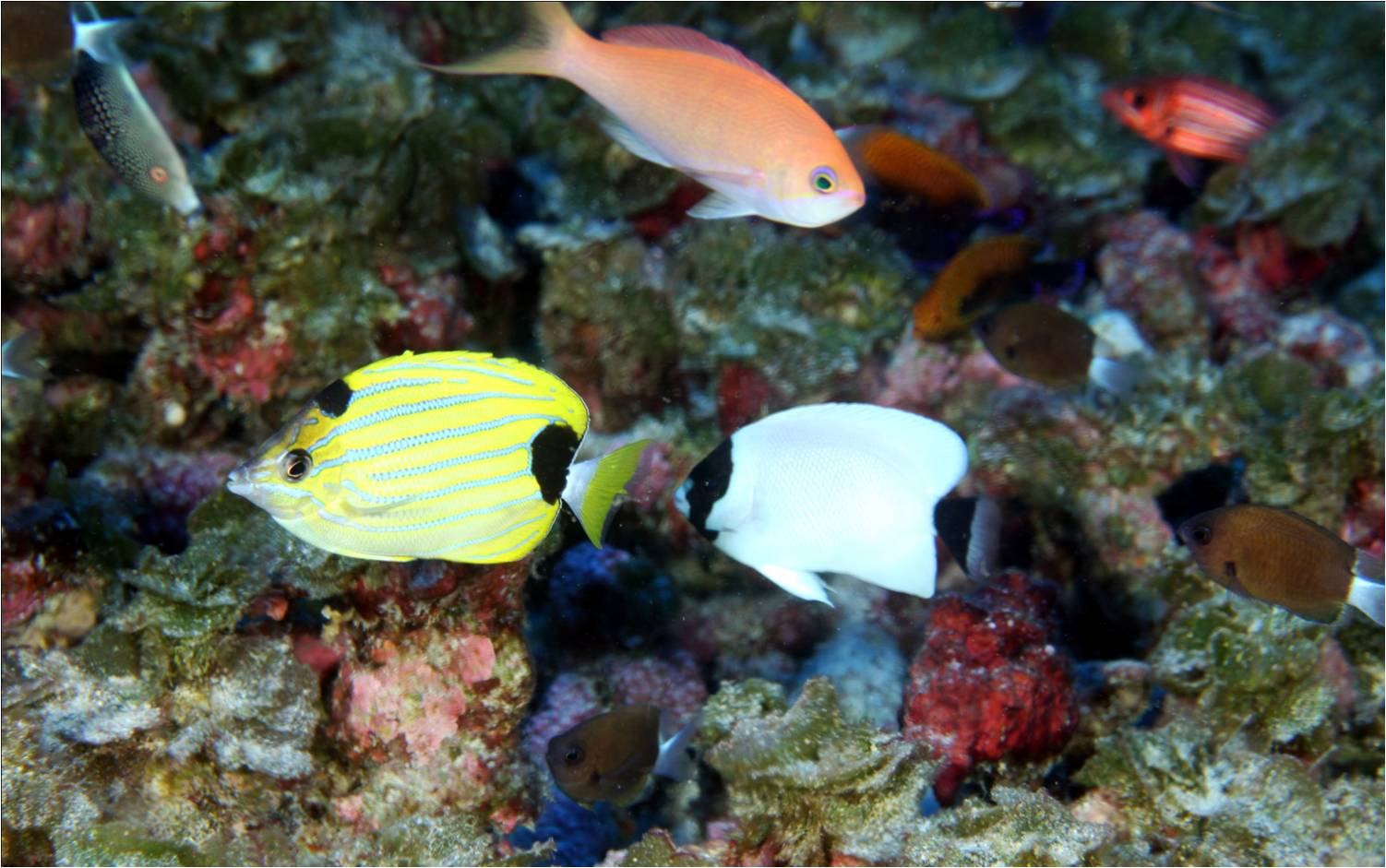
Pearl and Hermes Atoll: red tail wrasse, Thompson's anthias, Potter's angelfish, Hawaiian squirrelfish, chocolate-dip chromis, masked angelfish, and bluestripe butterflyfish

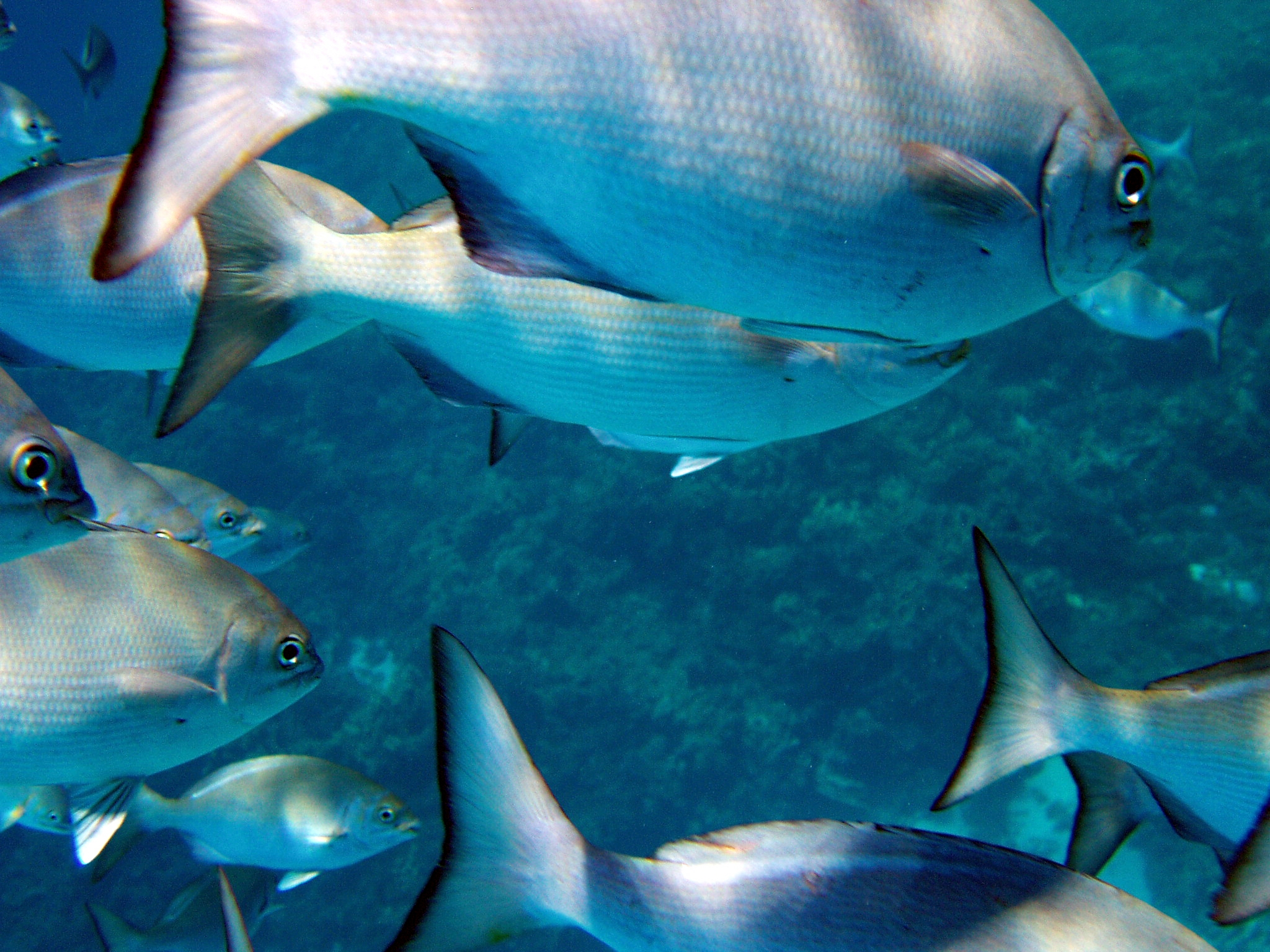
School of sea chubs

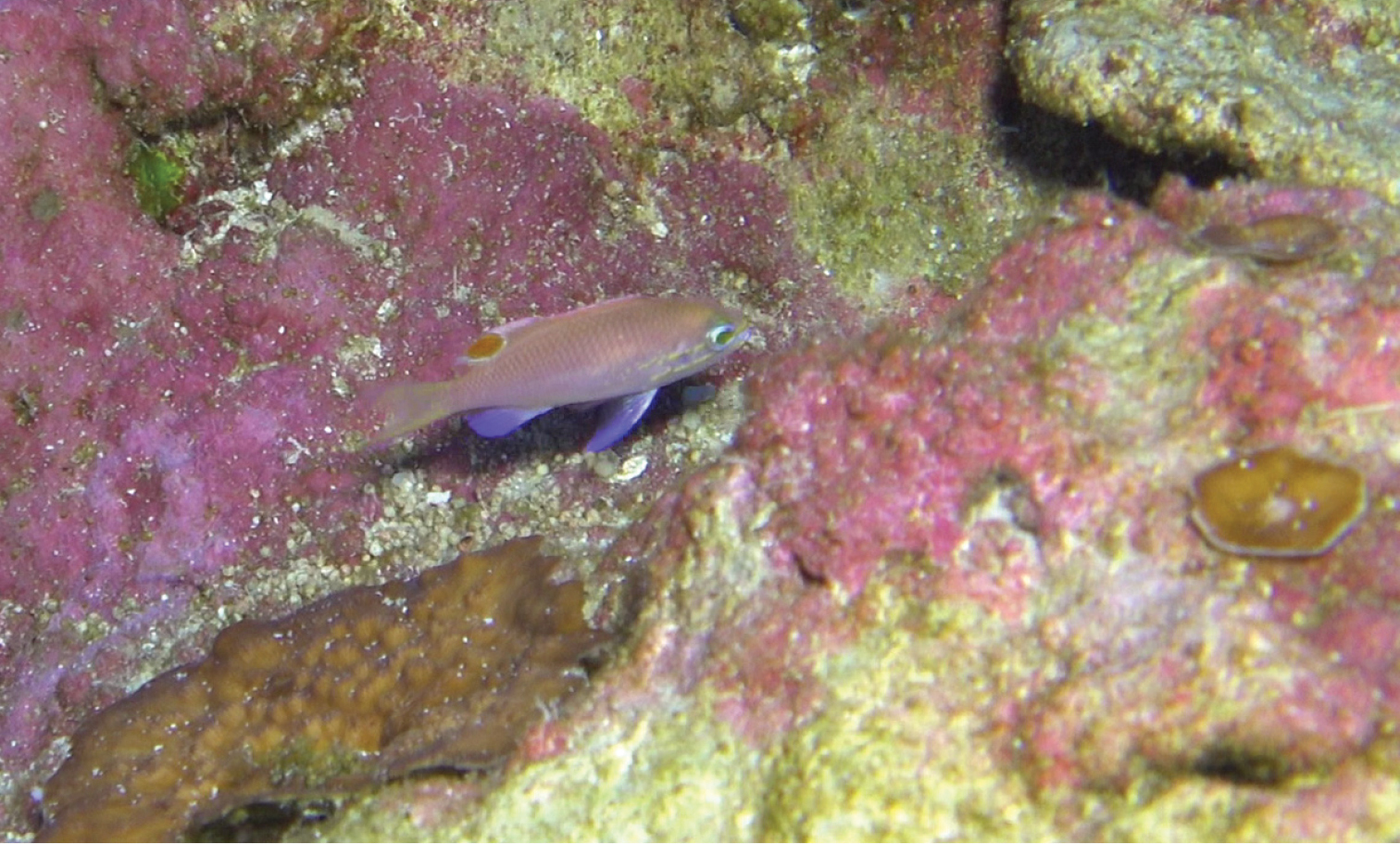
Obama's basslet

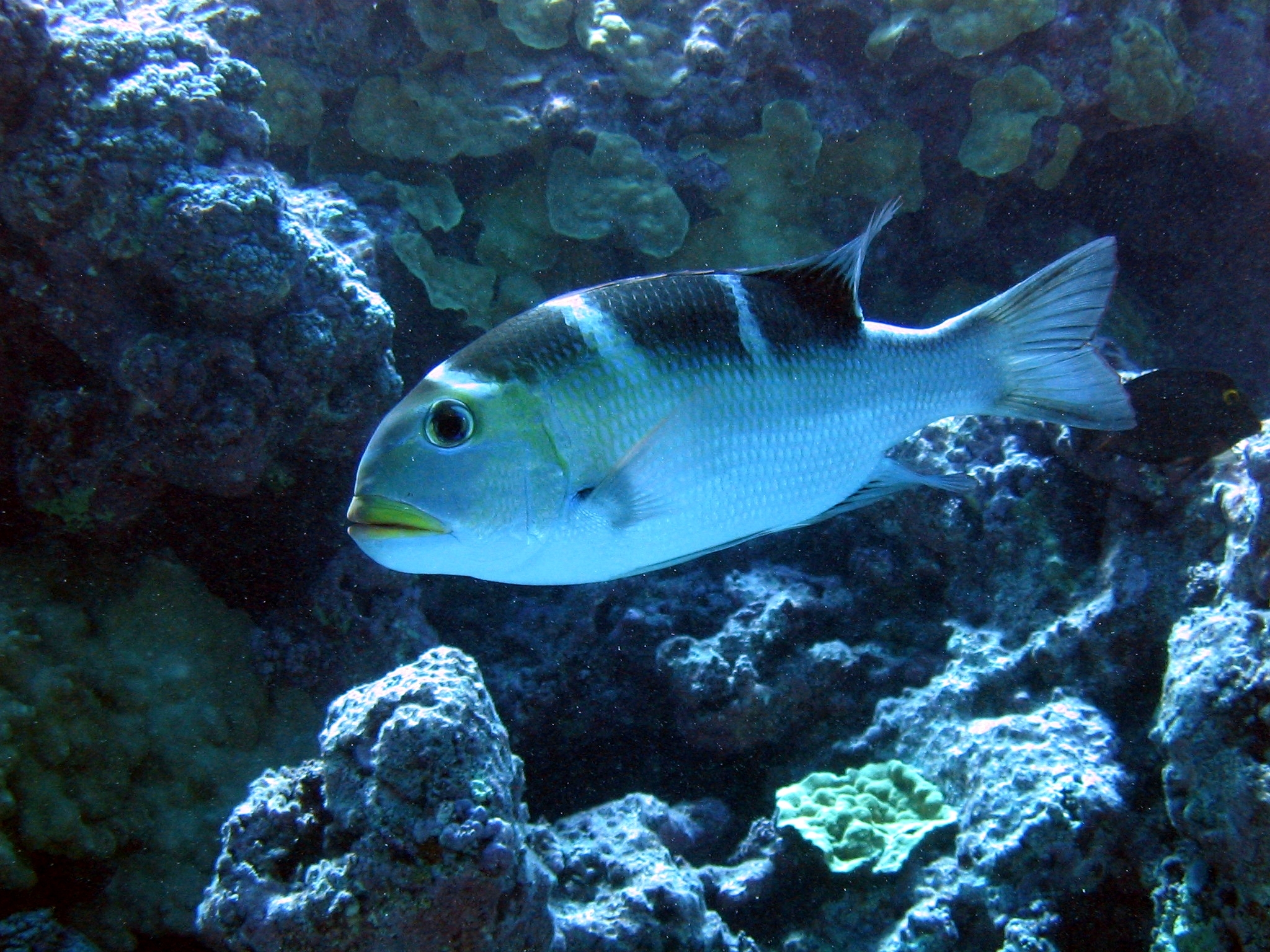
Bigeye emperor

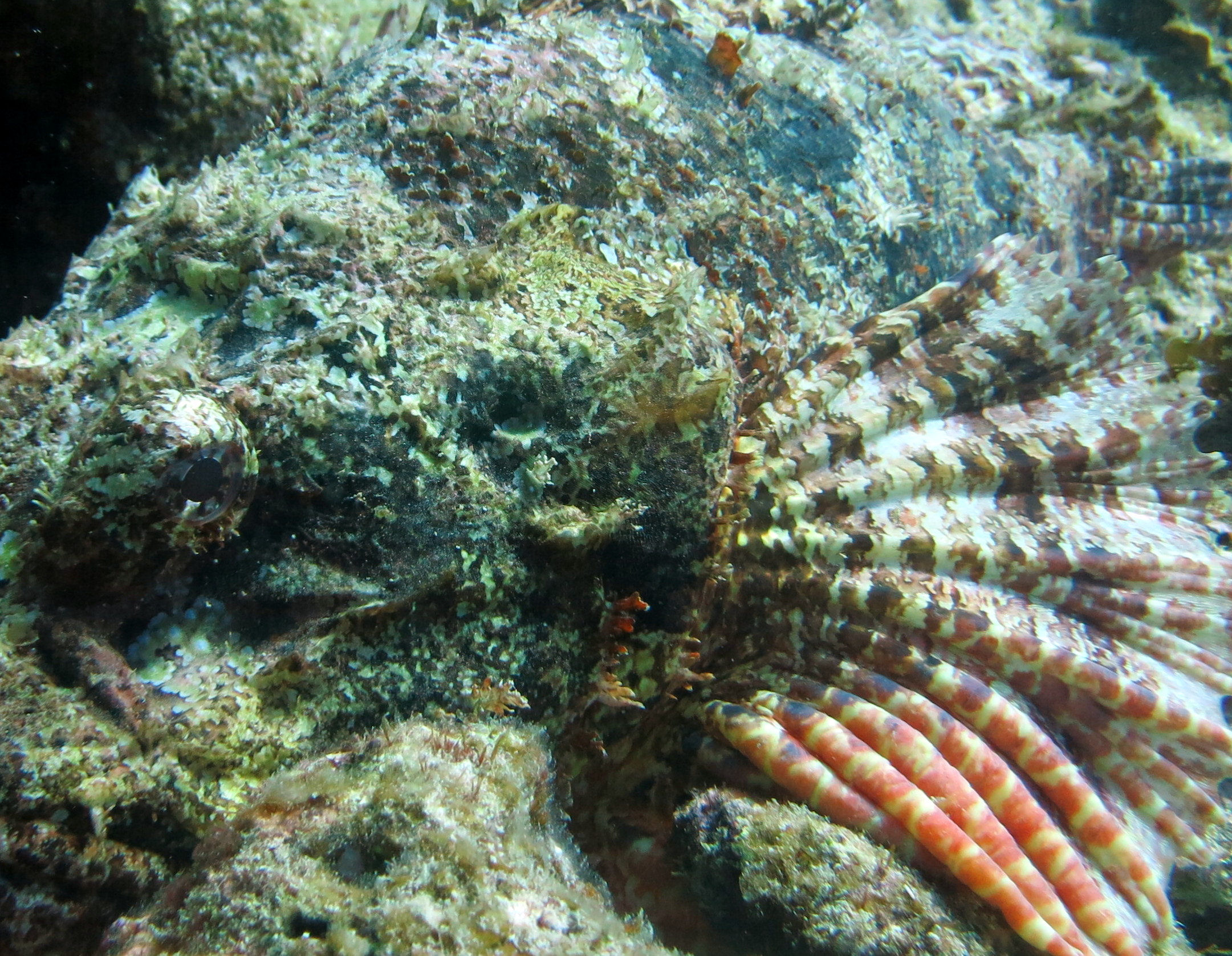
Titan scorpionfish
Marine turtles

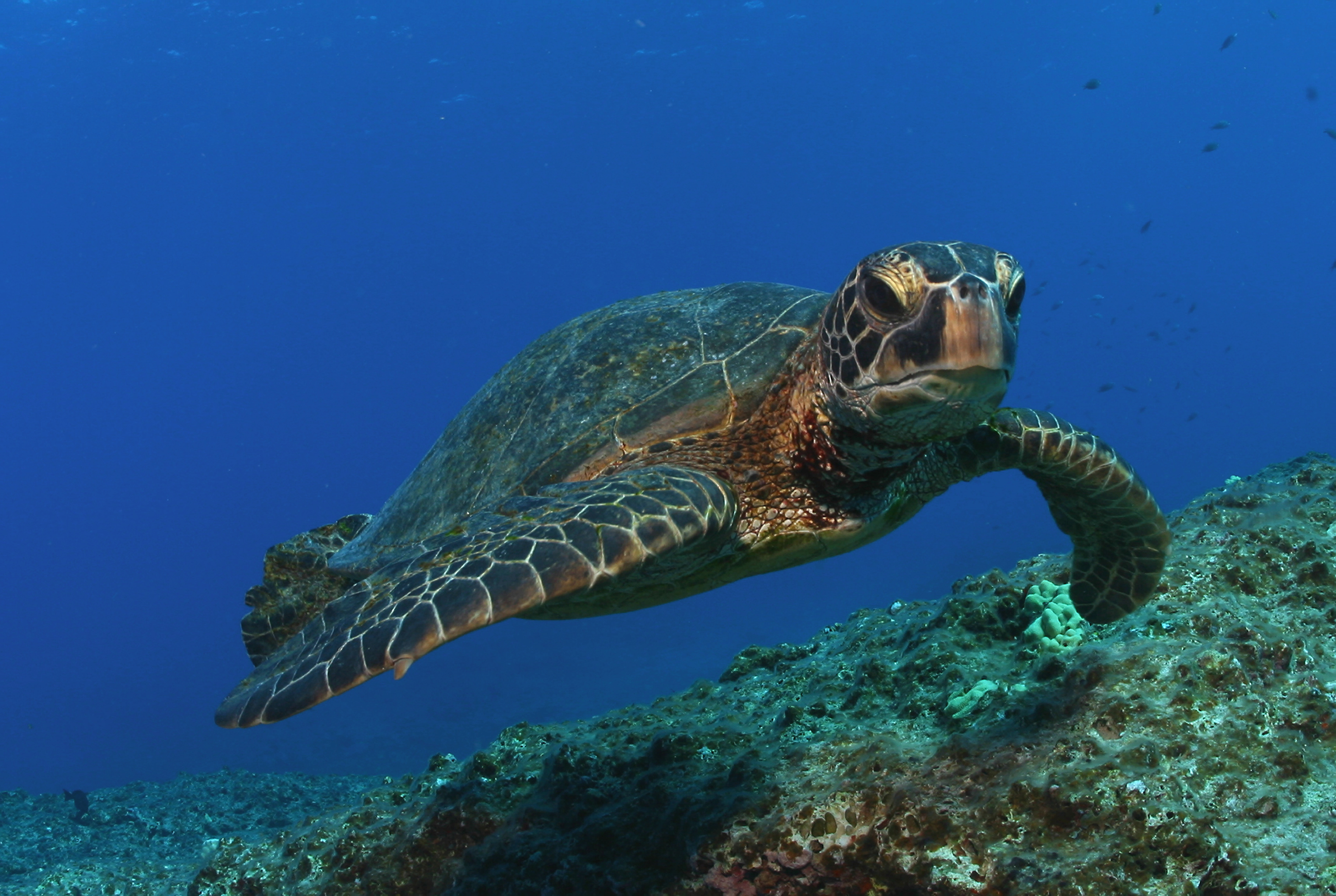
Green sea turtle

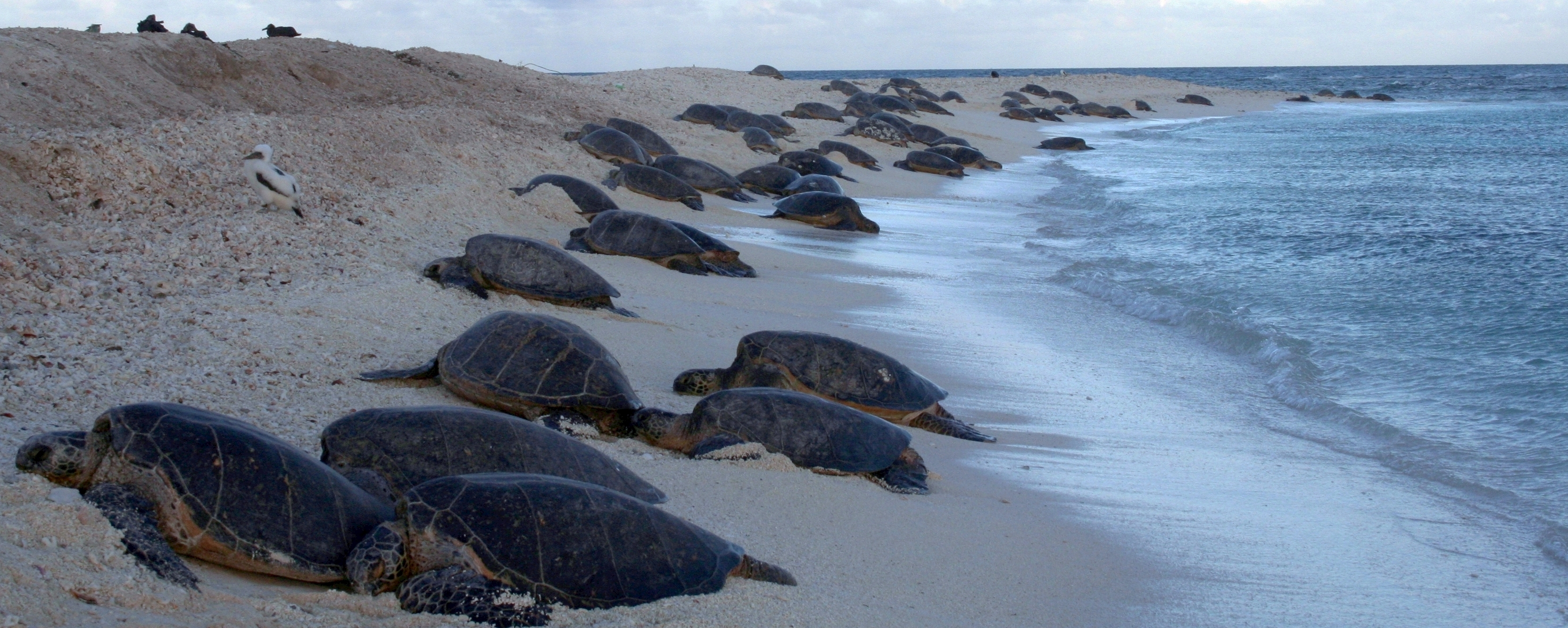
Sea turtles basking

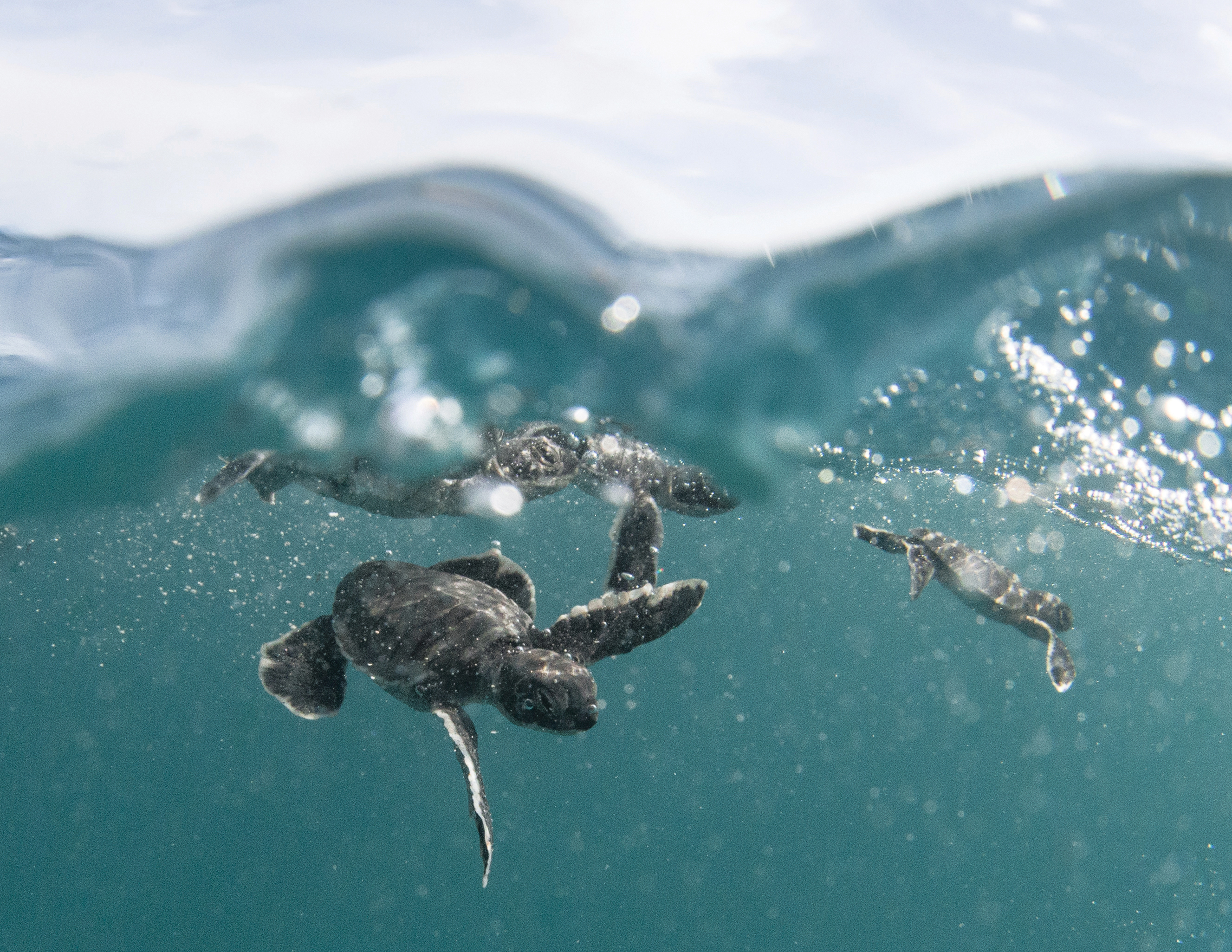
Baby green sea turtles
Avifauna

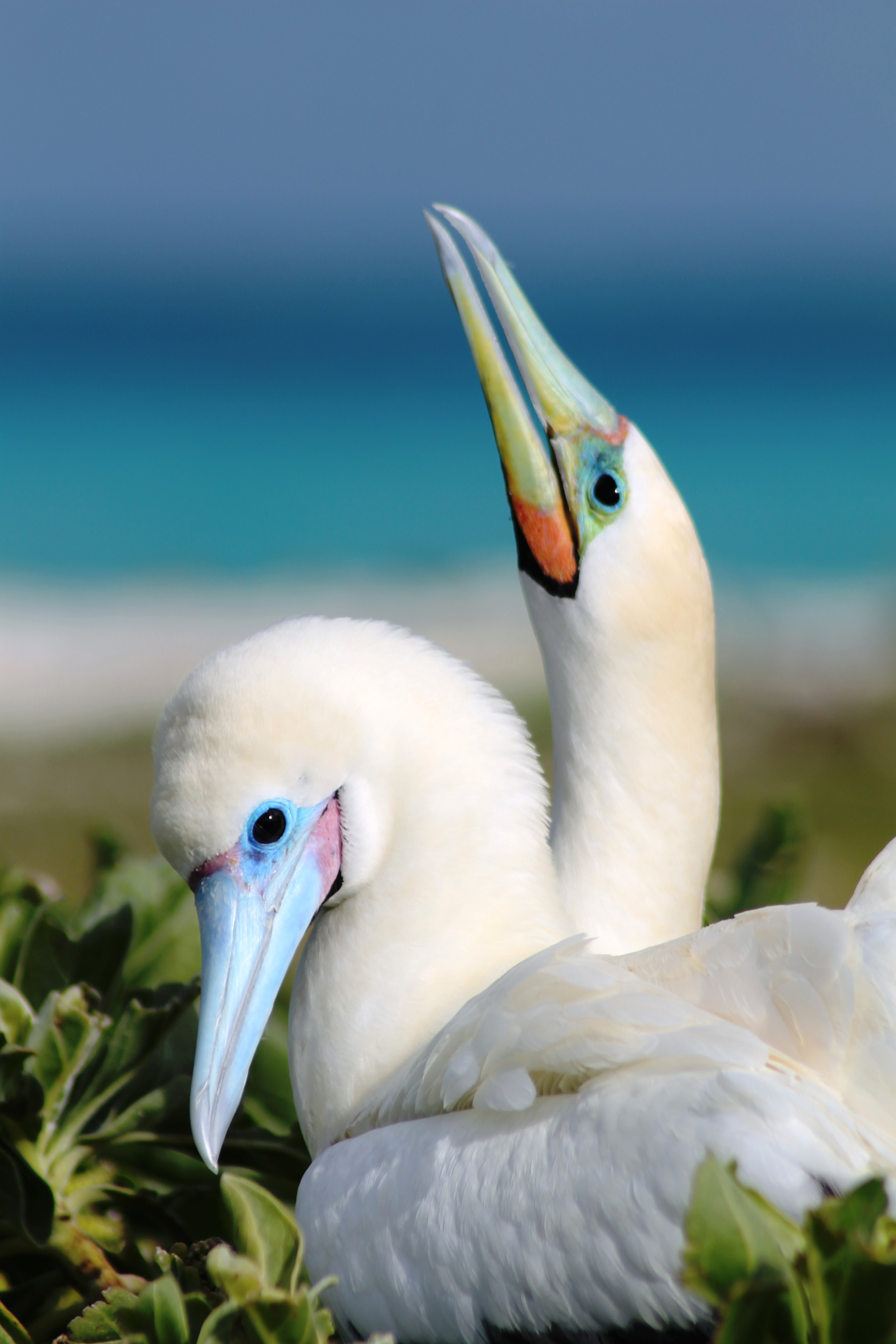
Red-footed boobies nesting

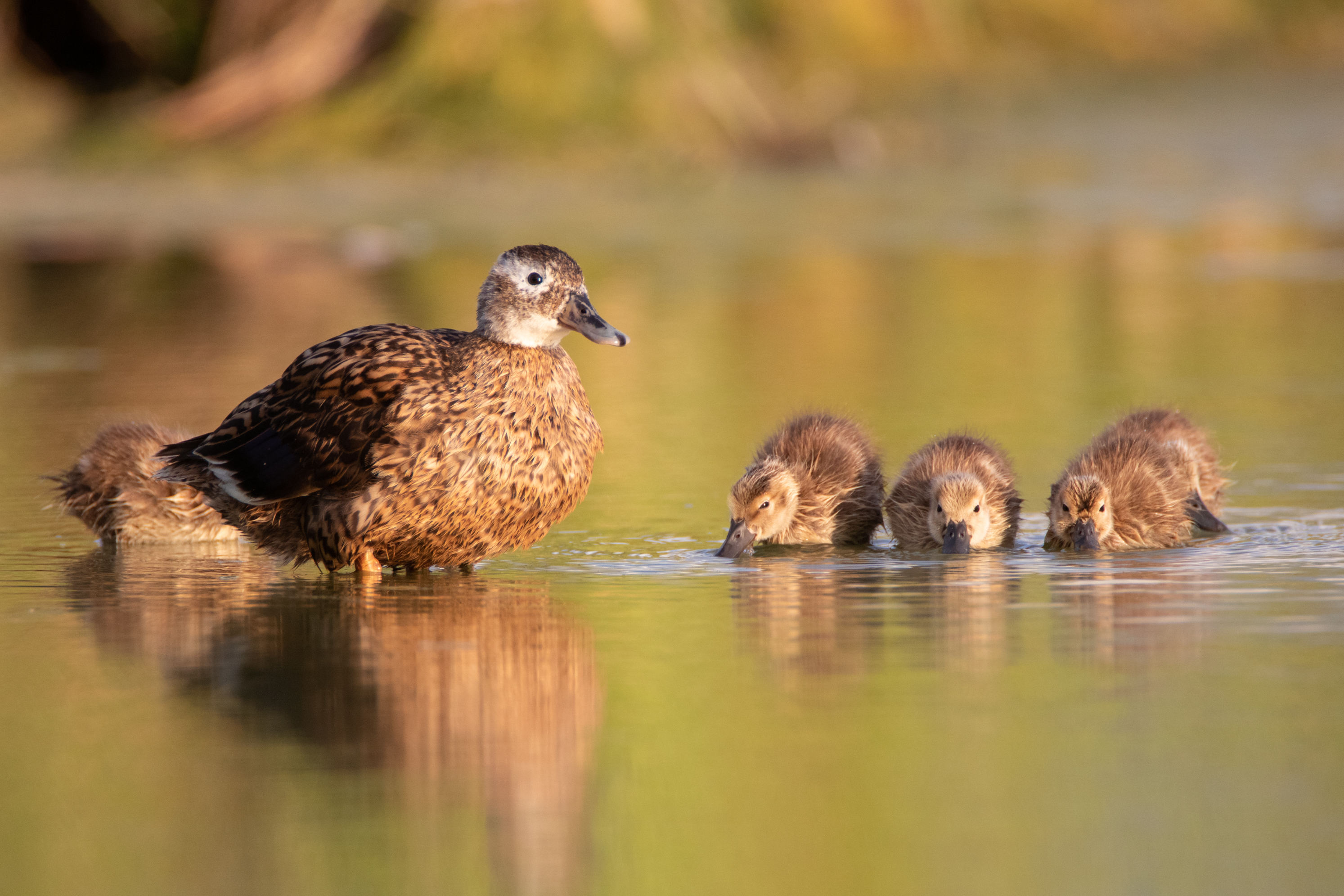
Laysan duck with ducklings

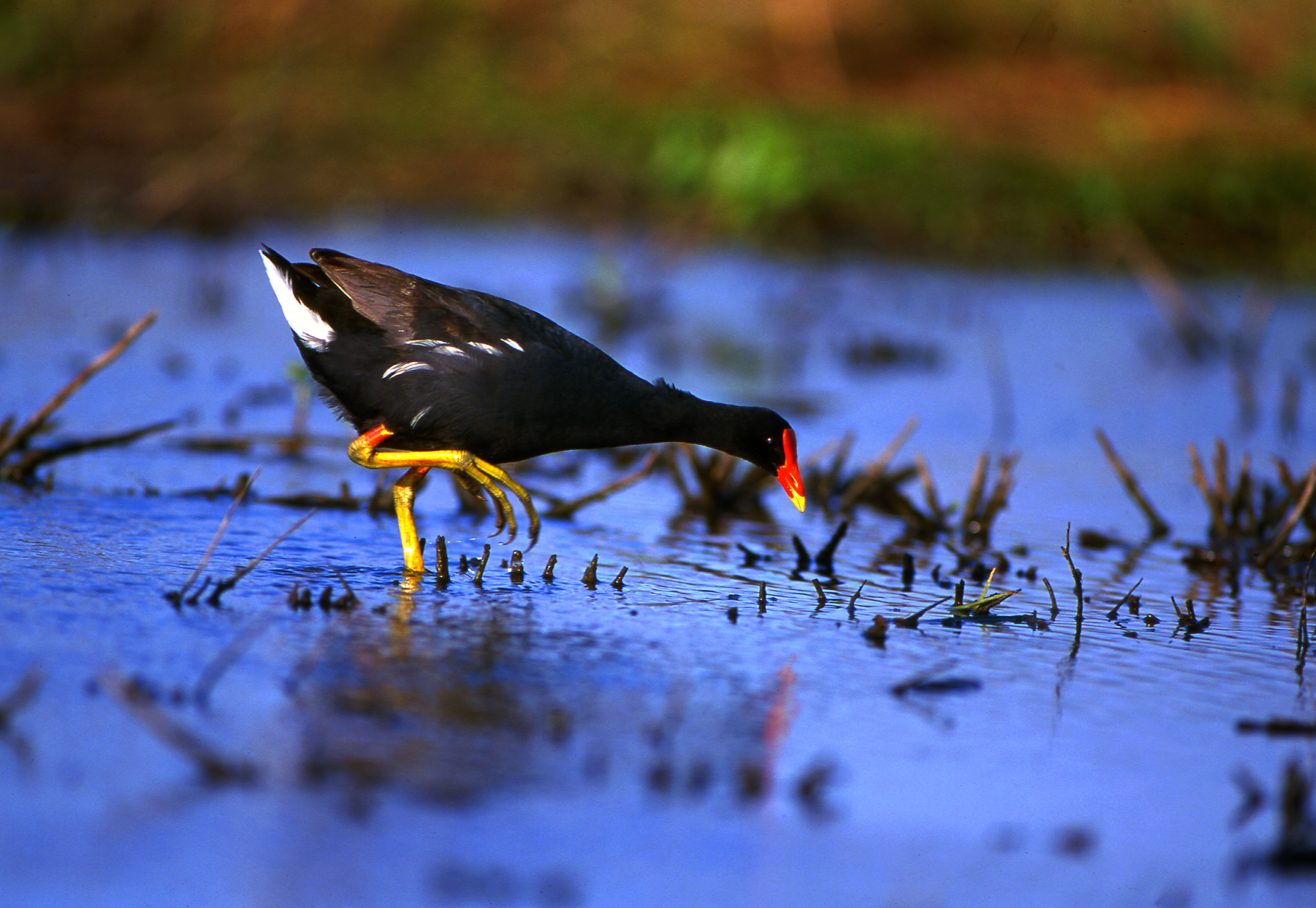
Hawaiian gallinule

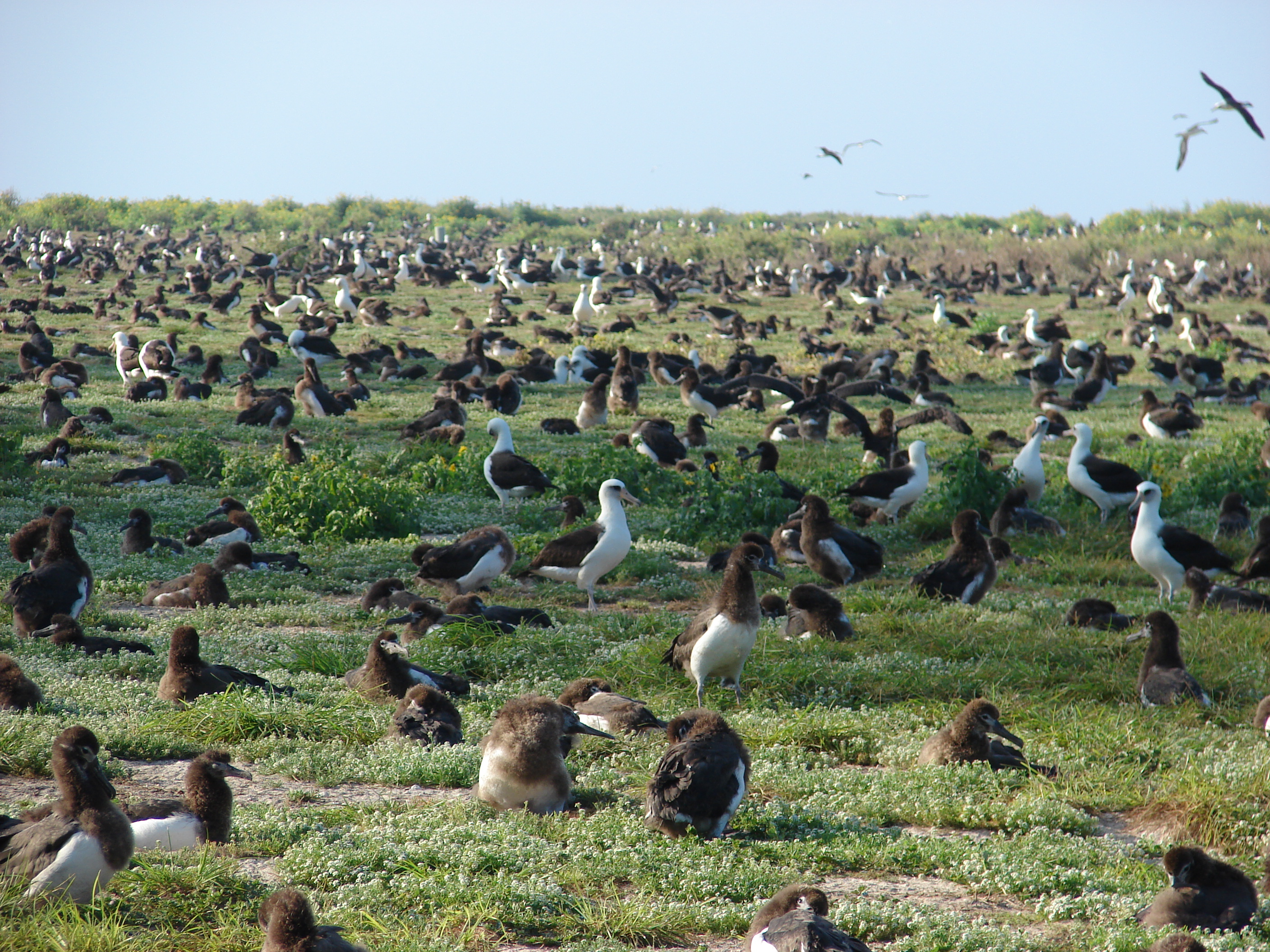
Laysan albatross at Midway Atoll, Sand Island

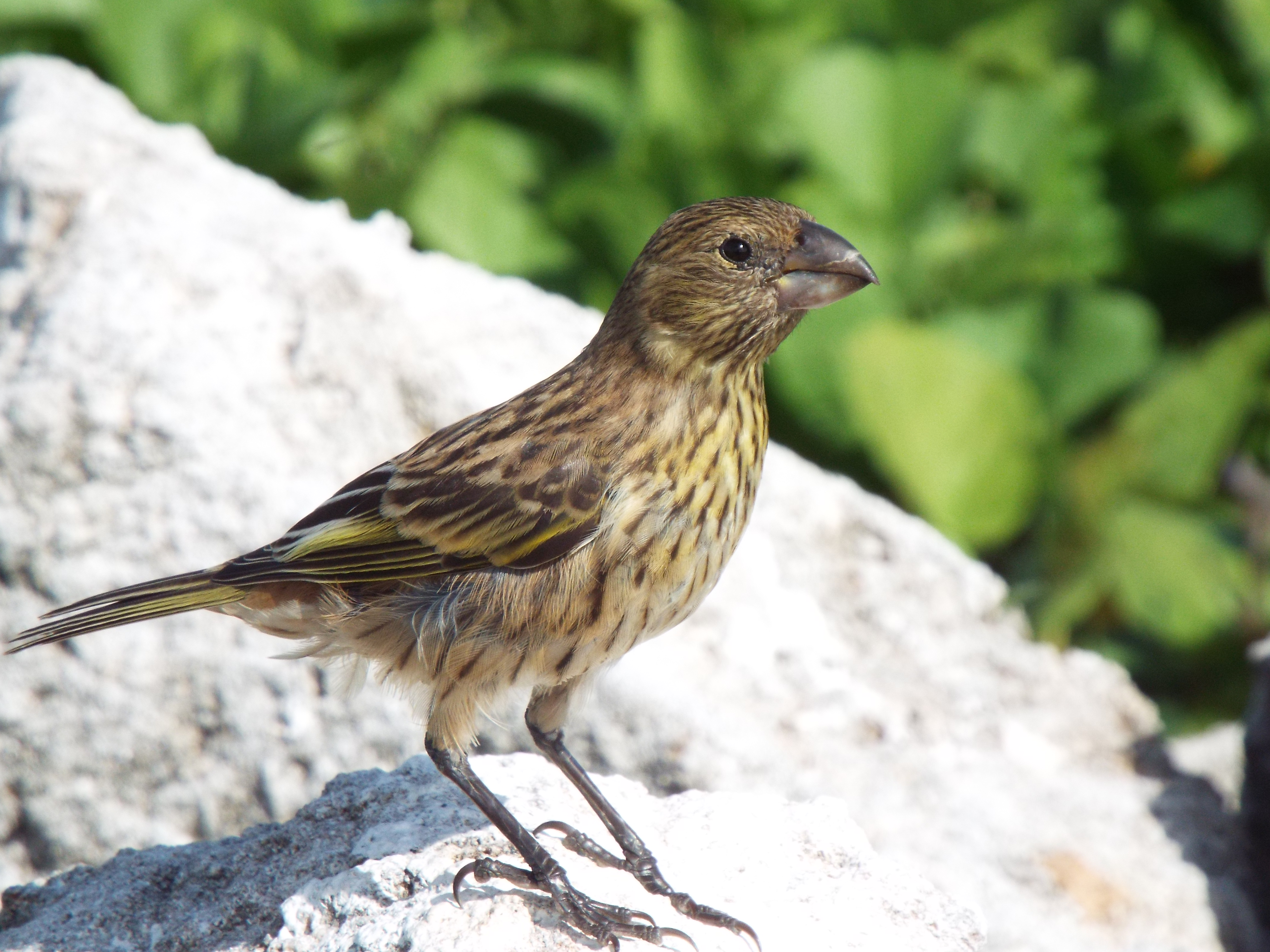
Laysan finch on guano pile

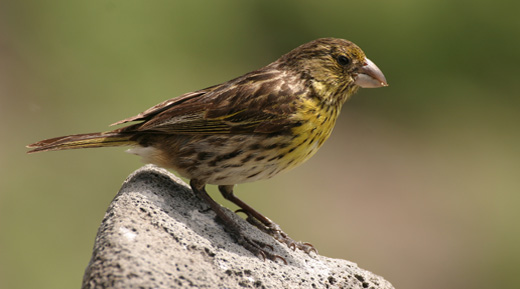
Nihoa finch

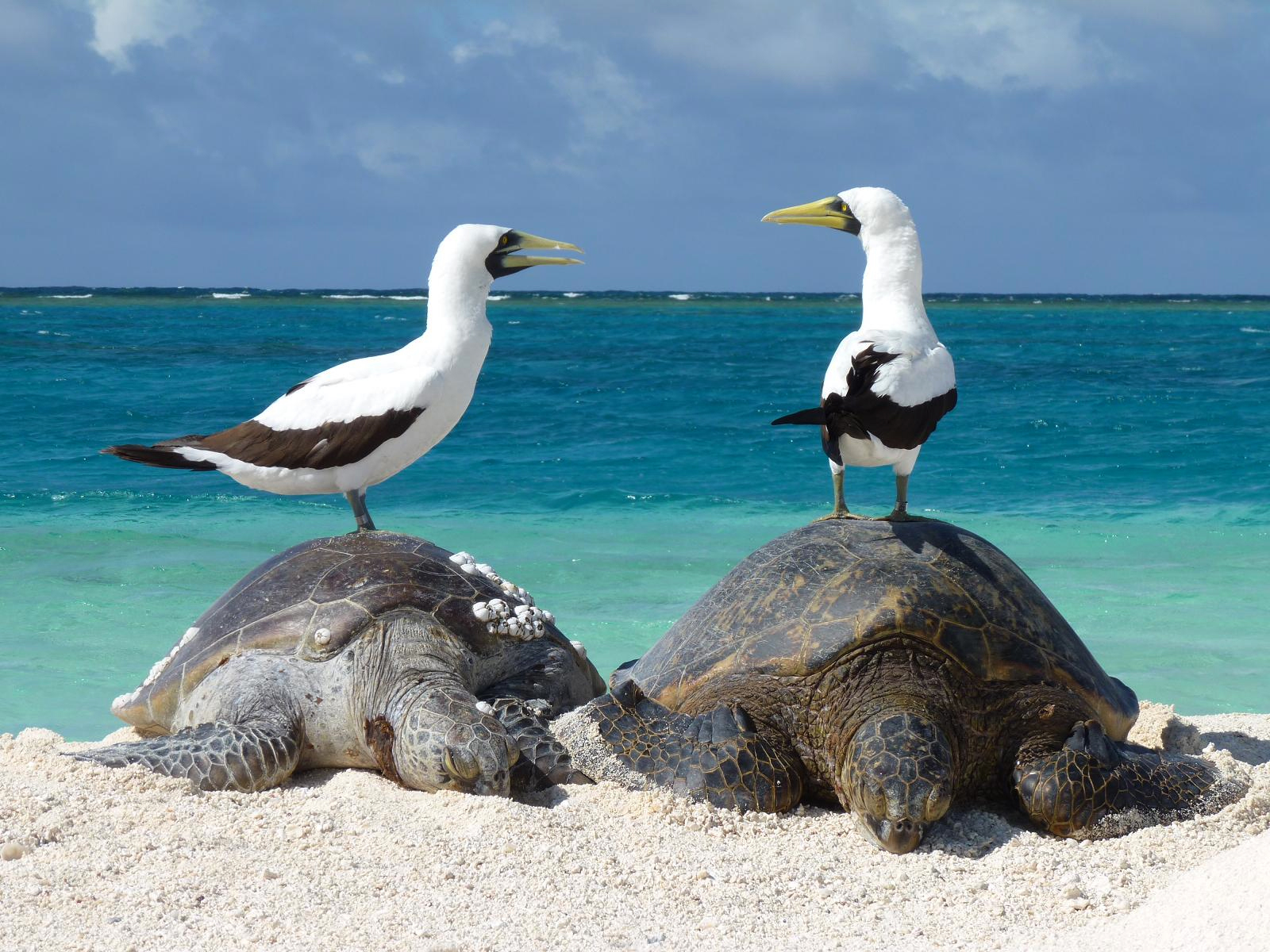
Green sea turtles and masked boobies

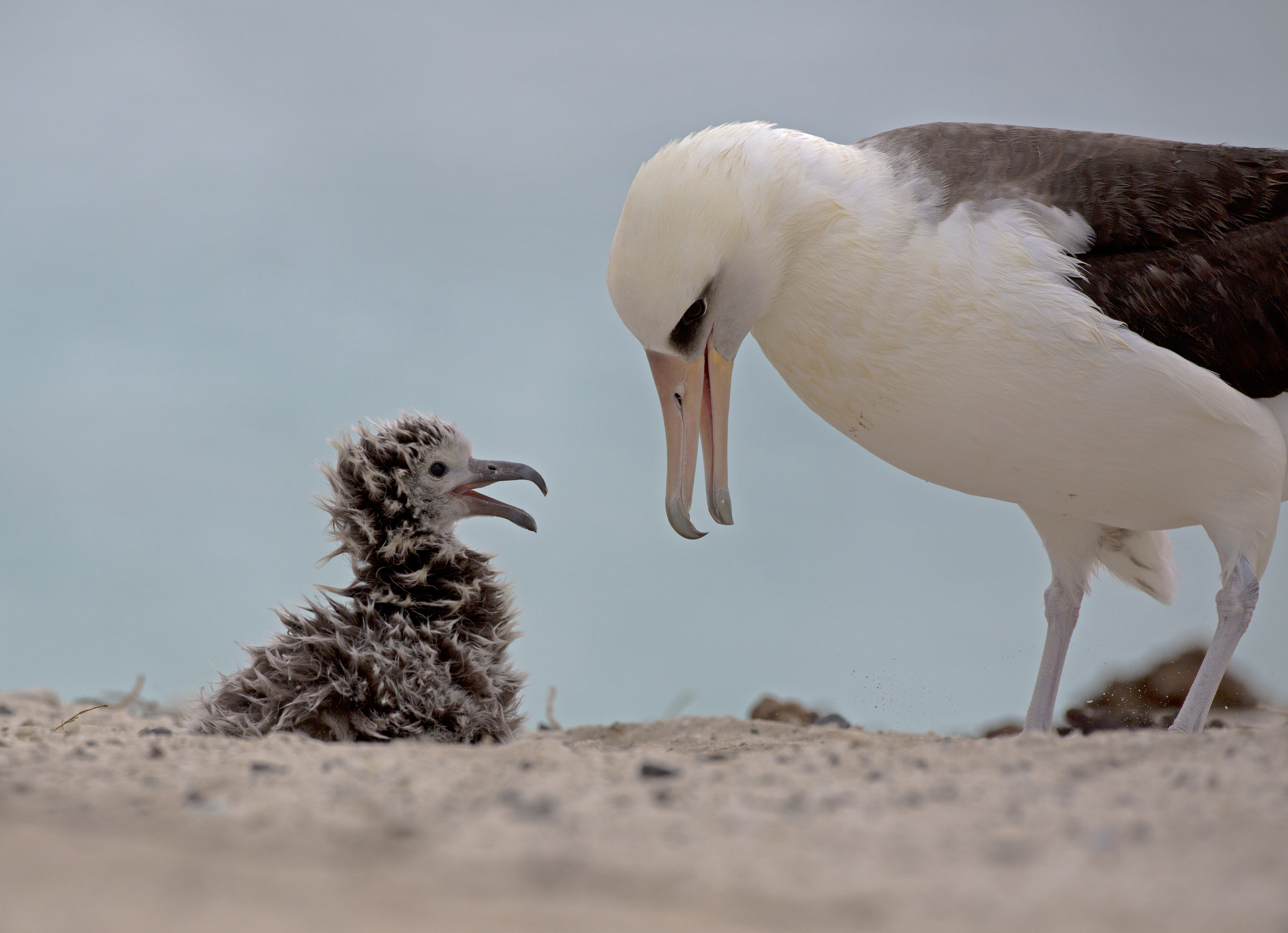
Laysan albatross mother and chick

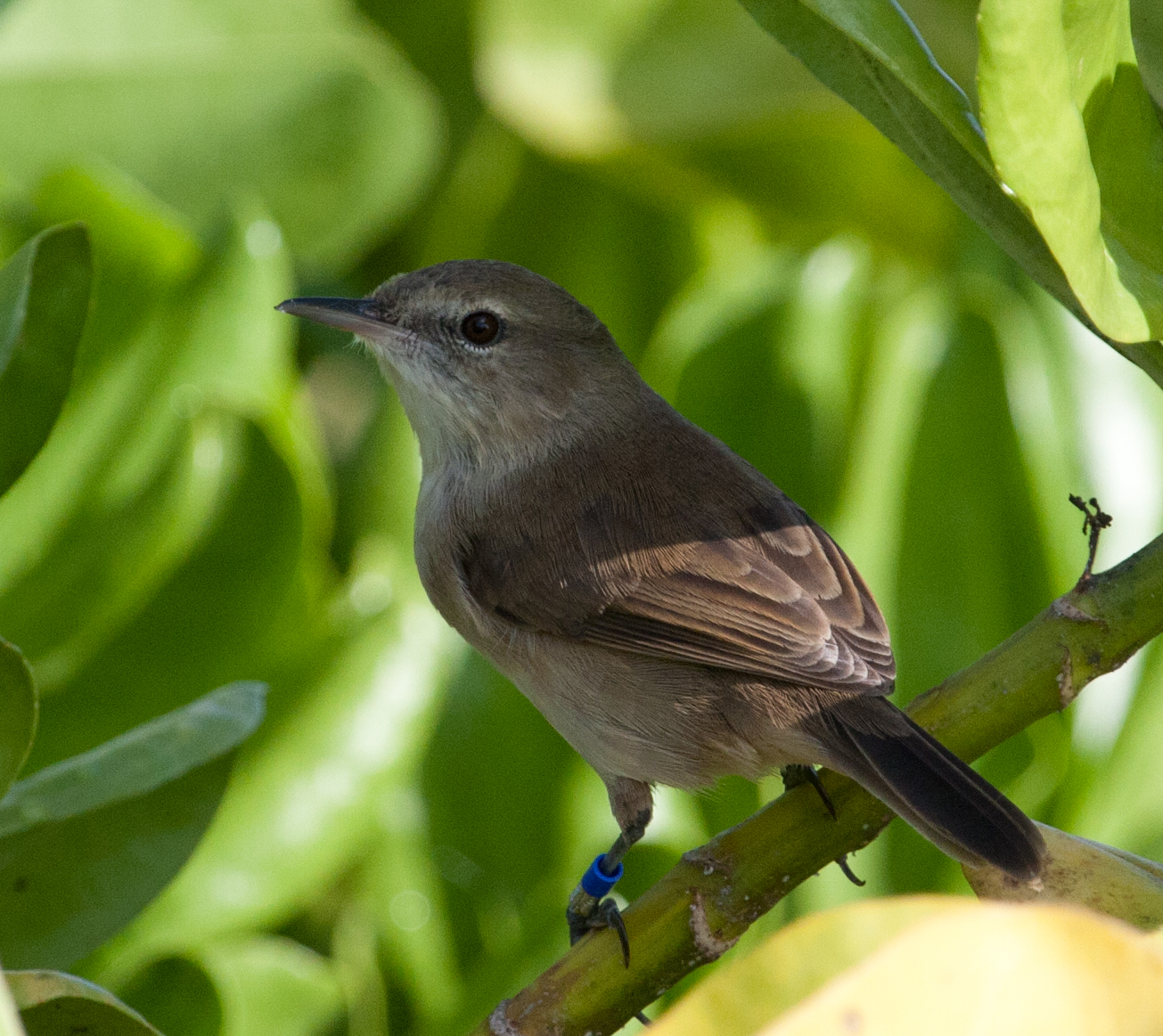
Nihoa millerbird
Marine mammals

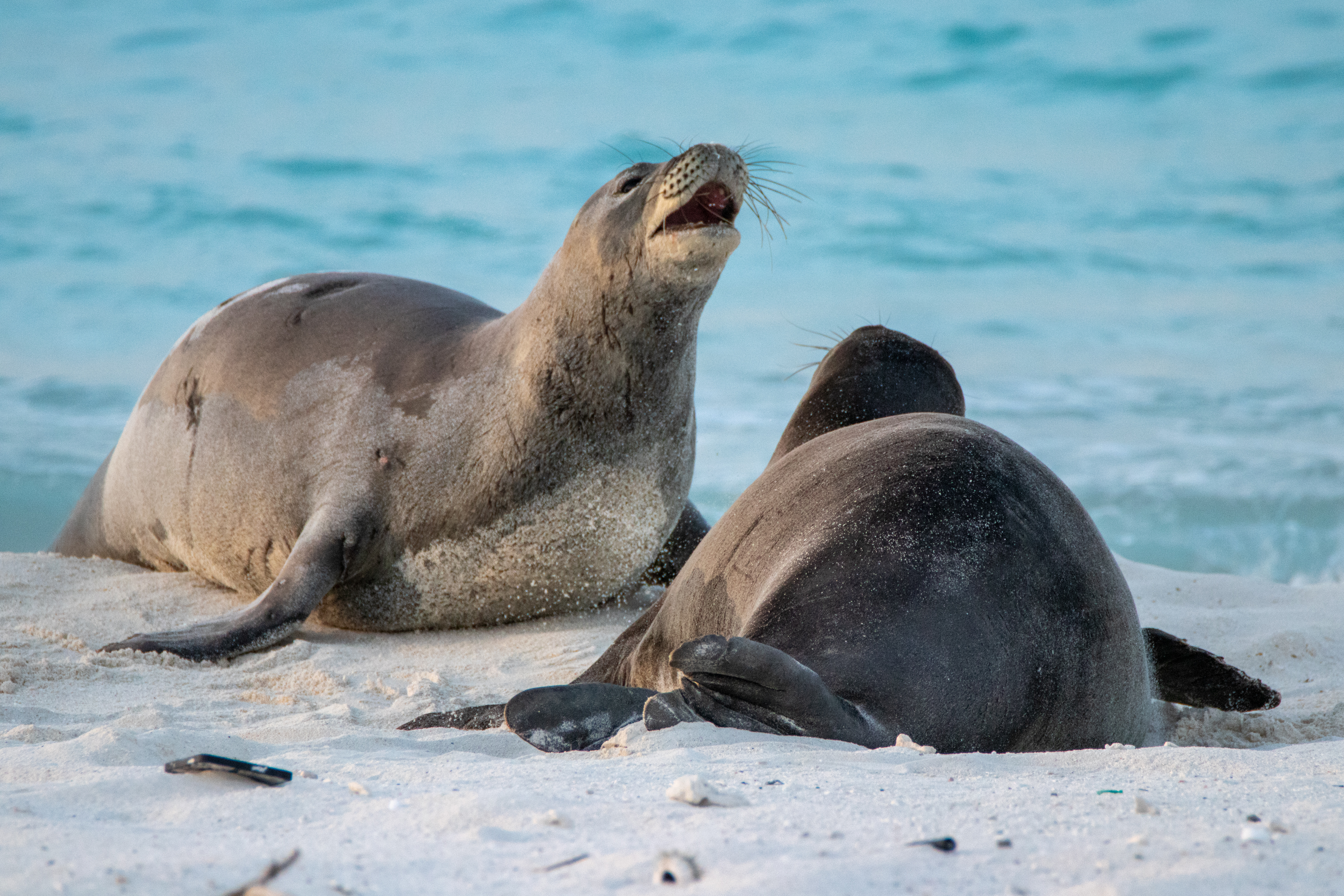
Hawaiian monk seals on Midway Atoll

Spinner dolphins

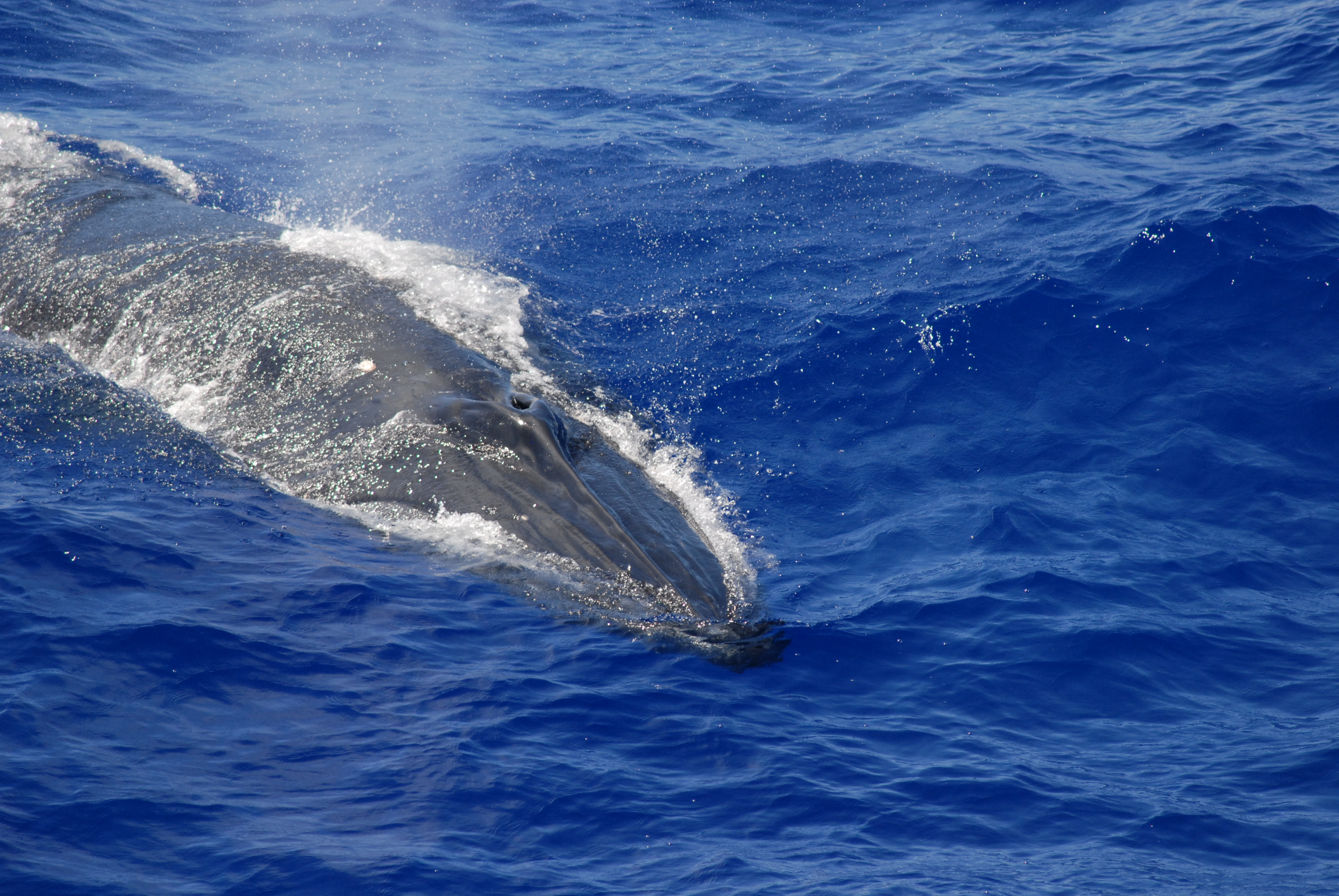
Bryde's whale

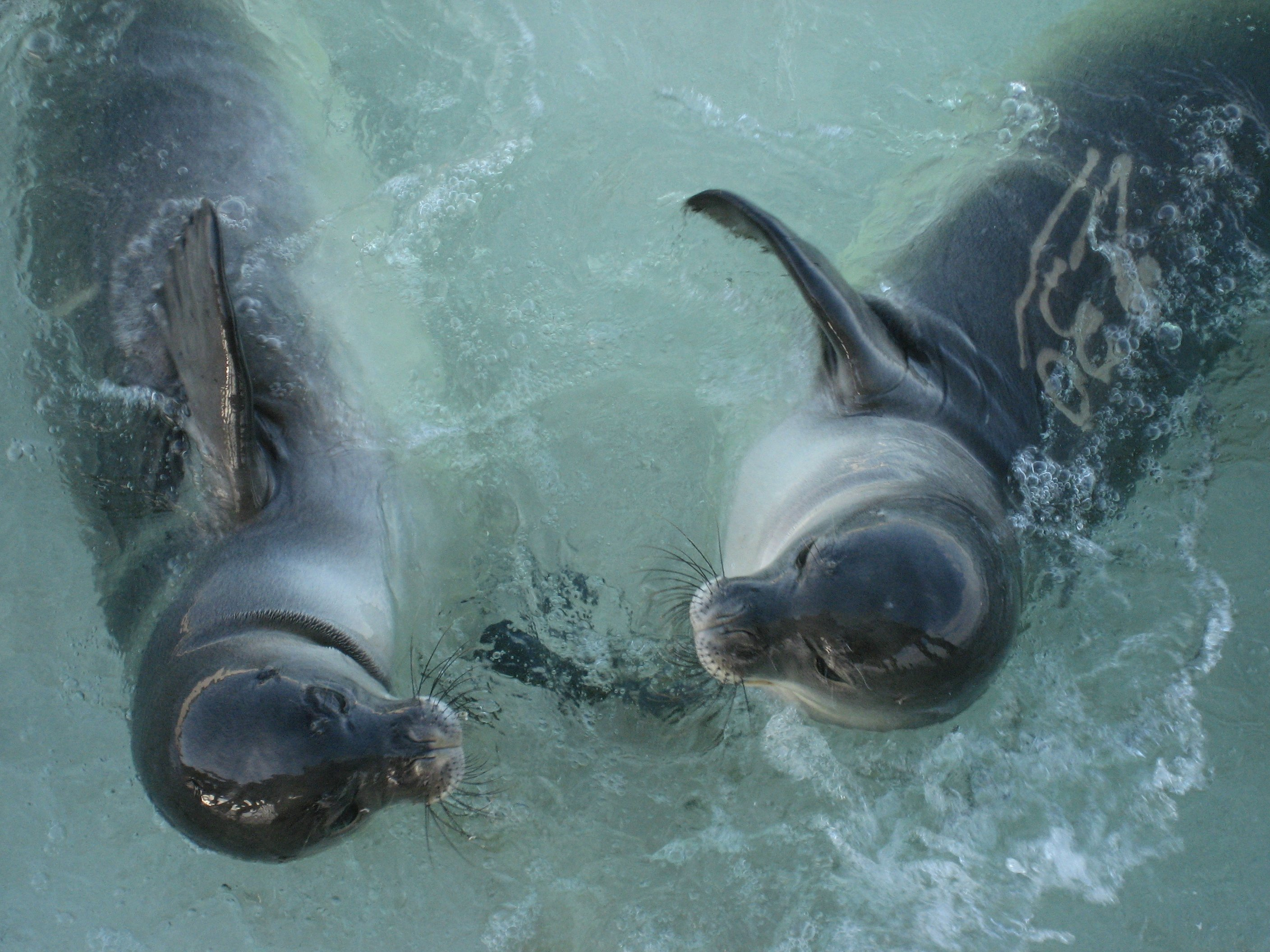
Hawaiian monk seals

== Commercial fishing ban ==
Commercial fishing ended in 2010, with the Monument receiving strict conservation protection, with exceptions for traditional Native Hawaiian uses and limited tourism. The NWHI bottomfish fishery was once a limited entry fishery, with eight vessels, which were restricted to 60 feet (18 m) in length. The fishery once accounted for approximately half of the locally landed bottomfish in Hawaii.

According to the Pew Charitable Trusts, populations of lobster have not recovered from extensive harvesting in the 1980s and 1990s; the remaining fisheries are overfished. The National Marine Fisheries Service (NMFS) reported in 2008 that many species' populations have not fully recovered from a large-scale shift in the oceanic ecosystem that affected the North Pacific during the late 1980s and early 1990s. This shift reduced populations of important species, such as spiny lobster, seabirds and Hawaiian monk seals.

A 2022 study reported that the protective status of the Monument led to the increased recovery of two fish populations with a spillover benefit from the protective areas of the Monument, which acted like a tuna nursery, leading to larger catches outside its boundaries. According to the researchers, the yellowfin tuna catch increased by 54% between 2016 and 2019, while bigeye tuna take increased by 12%. The catch increased the most 115 to 230 miles from the area boundaries.

== Maritime history ==
The area of the Monument is home to upwards of 80 shipwrecks and hundreds of submerged aircraft. Divers found the wreck of the USNS Mission San Miguel (T-AO-129) within the Monument in 2015. She had sunk there on October 8, 1957, when she ran aground on Maro Reef while running at full speed and in ballast. The Battle of Midway National Memorial is also part of the Monument. The wreck of the Imperial Japanese Navy aircraft carrier Akagi, which sank during World War II in the Battle of Midway on June 4, 1942, was found within the Monument by the research vessel Petrel in 2019. The wreck of USS Yorktown is also in the Monument. As casualties of war, the bodies of more than 3,000 military personnel lie within and near the Monument boundaries.

== See also ==
- List of marine protected areas of Hawaii
- List of national monuments of the United States
- List of World Heritage Sites in the United States
- Pacific Islands Heritage Marine National Monument
