= Thetis (disambiguation) =

Thetis is a sea nymph in Greek mythology.

Thetis, Thétis, or Thetys may also refer to:

== Greek mythology ==
- Thetis, the name of one of the Hesperides.

== Astronomy ==
- 17 Thetis, an asteroid
- Thetis Regio on Venus

== Places ==
- Thetis (island), Crete, Greece
- Thetis Island, British Columbia
- Thetis Lake, British Columbia
- Lake Thetis, Western Australia
- Mount Thetis, Tasmania
- Bahía Thetis, Mitre Peninsula, Tierra del Fuego Province

== Ships ==
- Thetis-class gunboat, a gunboat class of the Hellenic Navy
- Thetis-class patrol boat, a class of patrol boats of the United States Coast Guard
- Thetis-class patrol vessel, a ship class of the Royal Danish Navy
- French ship Thétis, various ships of the French Navy
- HDMS Thetis (F357), the first Royal Danish Navy ship in the Thetis class of ocean patrol vessels
- HMS Thetis, the name of various British Royal Navy ships
- HNLMS Thetis, a accommodation ship of the Royal Netherlands Navy
- SMS Thetis, a German warship
- USCGC Thetis, the name of various United States Coast Guard ships
- USS Thetis, the name of various United States Navy ships

== Other ==
- Thetis (decoy), a floating radar decoy used by German submarines during World War II
- Thetis Blacker, English painter and singer
- Mermaid Thetis, an antagonist in the Saint Seiya manga and its sequel
- Thetis, a boss character in Mega Man ZX Advent

== See also ==
- Tethys (disambiguation)
