= Thetis class =

Thetis class may refer to one of the following ship classes:

- Thetis-class patrol vessel, a class of four vessels operated by the Royal Danish Navy from 1991 to present
- Thetis-class gunboat, a class of five anti-submarine ships operated by the German Navy from 1962 until the 1990s, then the Hellenic Navy from 1991 until 2010
- Thetis-class patrol boat, a class of seventeen patrol boats operated by the United States Coast Guard

== See also ==
- Thetis (disambiguation), for individual ships named Thetis
