= Doxa (disambiguation) =

Doxa is the Greek word for "belief" or "opinion", or in Christian contexts, "glory". It may also refer to:

- Doxa SA, Swiss watchmaker
- DOXA Documentary Film Festival, in Vancouver, British Columbia, Canada
- Lake Doxa, reservoir in Corinthia, Greece
- Greek ship Doxa, two destroyers of the Hellenic Navy
- Nya Doxa, Swedish book publisher
- Doxa (cave), a cave on Crete
- Doxa (magazine), a Russian online student magazine

== Greek football clubs ==
- Doxa Desfina F.C.
- Doxa Drama F.C.
- Doxa Katokopias FC, Cypriot
- Doxa Kranoula F.C.
- Doxa Vyronas F.C.

== See also ==
- Glory (disambiguation)
