= Thetis (ship) =

Several ships have been named Thetis for Thetis:

- Thetis (1786 EIC ship) was launched on the river Thames as an East Indiaman. She made six voyages for the British East India Company between 1787 and 1800, She then was sold and spent a handful of years as a West Indiaman. She was broken up in 1806.
- Thetis (1787 ship) was launched in 1787 at Stockton-on-Tees, or Hull. Between 1787 and 1799 she sailed between London and Hamburg. Then, between 1799 and 1804 she made two voyages as a whaler in the British southern whale fishery. She became a coaster and made at least one voyage to Quebec before she was lost on 28 February 1812.
- Thetis (1793 ship) was launched in 1793 in Rotherhithe. She spent most of her career as a West Indiaman and several years as a government transport. Between 1830 and 1836 she made two voyages as a whaler in the British southern whale fishery, then returned to western hemisphere trading and was last listed in 1842.
- Thetis (1794 Chittagong ship) was built at Chittagong. She made one voyage to England for the British East India Company (EIC) in 1801. She was rebuilt at Calcutta in 1817 and at Moulmein in 1838. She was still sailing out of Calcutta in 1839.
- HCS Thetis (1810), of 185 tons (bm) and twelve guns, was launched by the Bombay Dockyard for the Bombay Marine, the British East India Company's navy. She served in the Invasion of Isle de France, was condemned from service and between 1834 and 1835 underwent fitting as a light vessel.
- Thetis (1801 ship) was launched in 1801 at Lancaster as a West Indiaman. Between 1806 and 1808, she made two trips as a slave ship. At the end of the slave trade, she returned to trading, first with the West Indies and then with Bahia. She was wrecked in December 1815 near Sunderland.
- Thetis (1813 Chittagong ship) was launched at Chittagong in 1813. At some point she was renamed Countess of Loudoun (or Countess of Loudon, or erroneously Countess of London) for Flora Mure-Campbell, Marchioness of Hastings, Countess of Loudoun. She wrecked in early November 1816 off Palawan.

== See also ==
- French ship Thétis, twelve vessels of the French Navy
- HDMS Thetis (F357) of the Danish Navy
- HMS Thetis, twelve vessels of the British Royal Navy
- SMS Thetis of the Imperial German Navy
- USCGC Thetis (WMEC-910) of the US Coast Guard
- USS Thetis, two vessels of the US Navy
- USS Thetis Bay of the US Navy
