= Tethys =

Tethys or Tethis may refer to:

- Tethys (database), an online knowledge management system about the environmental effects of offshore renewable energy
- Tethys (gastropod), genus of gastropods in the family Tethydidae
- Tethys (moon), a natural satellite of Saturn
- Tethys (mythology), a Titaness in Greek mythology
- Thetys (salp), a genus of gelatinous sea salp
- Tethys Ocean, a Mesozoic-era ocean between the continents of Gondwana and Laurasia
- Tethys Research Institute, a non-governmental scientific organisation based in Italy
- Téthys Consortium, an international network of universities from the Mediterranean region
- "Tethys", a song from The Ocean of the Sky by The Used
- Tethys, the Japanese name for "Thetis", a boss character in Mega Man ZX Advent
- Tethys River, an interplanetary waterway in Dan Simmons's Hyperion Cantos

== See also ==
- Thetis (disambiguation)
