= HDMS Thetis =

HDMS Thetis may refer to:

- HDMS Thetis (1790), a frigate of the Royal Danish Navy
- HDMS Thetis (1840), a frigate of the Royal Danish Navy
- HDMS Thetis (F340), a corvette of the Royal Danish Navy
- HDMS Thetis (F357), a vessel of the Royal Danish Navy

== See also ==
- Thetis (ship)
