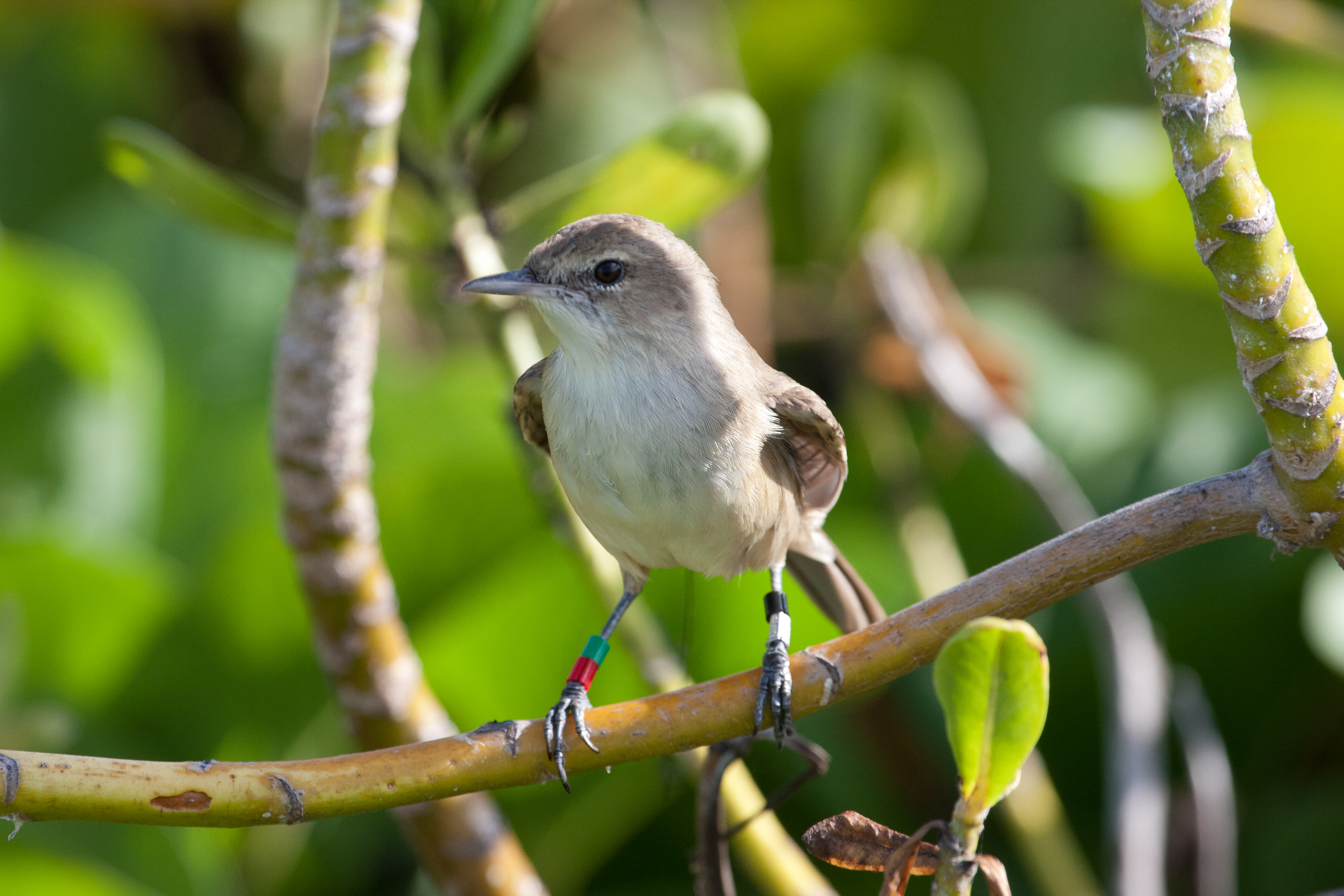
- At Laysan, Northwestern Hawaiian Islands, USA

Conservation status
- Endangered (IUCN 3.1)

- Critically Imperiled (NatureServe)

Scientific classification
- Kingdom: Animalia
- Phylum: Chordata
- Class: Aves
- Order: Passeriformes
- Family: Acrocephalidae
- Genus: Acrocephalus
- Species: A. familiaris

Binomial name
- Acrocephalus familiaris (Rothschild, 1892)

Subspecies
- A. f. kingi †A. f. familiaris
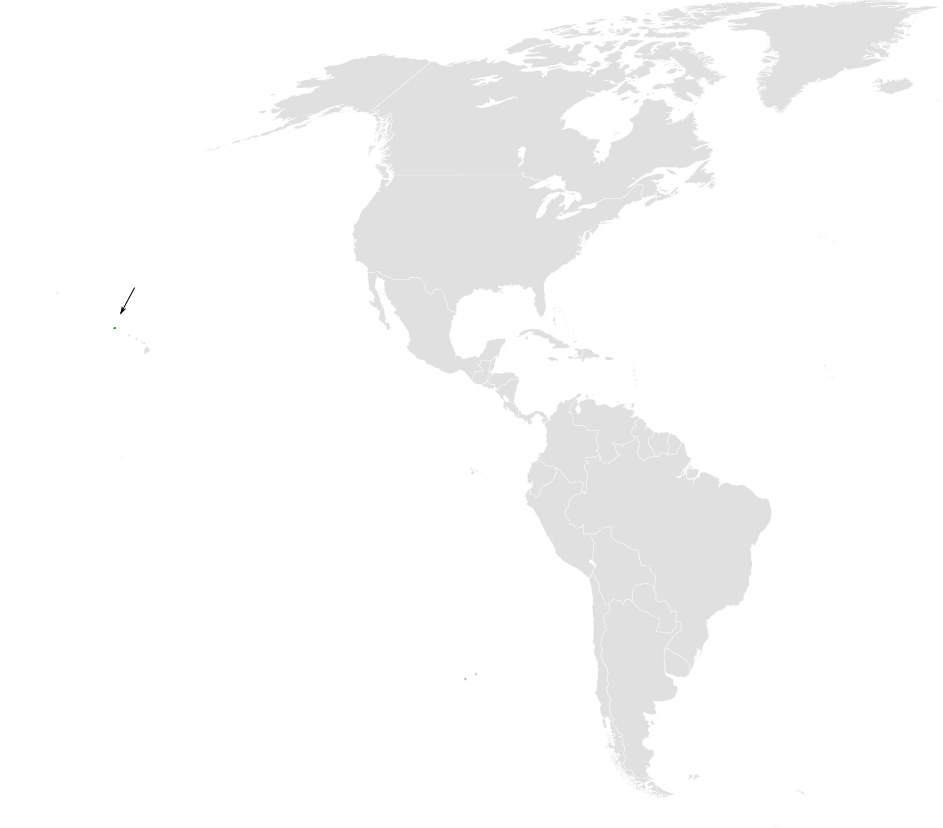

= Millerbird =

Species of bird

The millerbird (Acrocephalus familiaris) is a species of Old World warbler in the family Acrocephalidae endemic to the Hawaiian Islands.

== Taxonomy ==
It has two subspecies, A. f. kingi and A f. familiaris. The nominate subspecies, the Laysan millerbird, became extinct sometime between 1916 and 1923. The other, the critically endangered Nīhoa millerbird, is the only race left, inhabiting the small island of Nīhoa in Hawaiʻi, though it has since been reintroduced to Laysan. It is the only Old World warbler to have colonised Hawaiʻi, and there is no fossil evidence that the species ever had a distribution beyond these two islands.

== Behavior and breeding ==
Millerbirds form long-term pair bonds and defend territories over a number of years. Territories can be as large as 0.95 hectares (2.3 acres), although 0.19–0.40 hectares (0.47–0.99 acres) is more typical. Breeding occurs variably from January to September depending on food availability.

== Identification ==
A small warbler that occurs only on Nīhoa and Laysan in the Northwestern Hawaiian Islands. It is unlikely to be confused with any other species; the only other passerines on those islands are finches. It does not occur on the main Hawaiian Islands and prefers dense, low vegetation. It is usually secretive and hard to see well, but males sometimes sing from an exposed perch. The song and calls are harsh chirps and churring.
