= Hyacinthe de Bougainville =

French admiral (1781–1846)

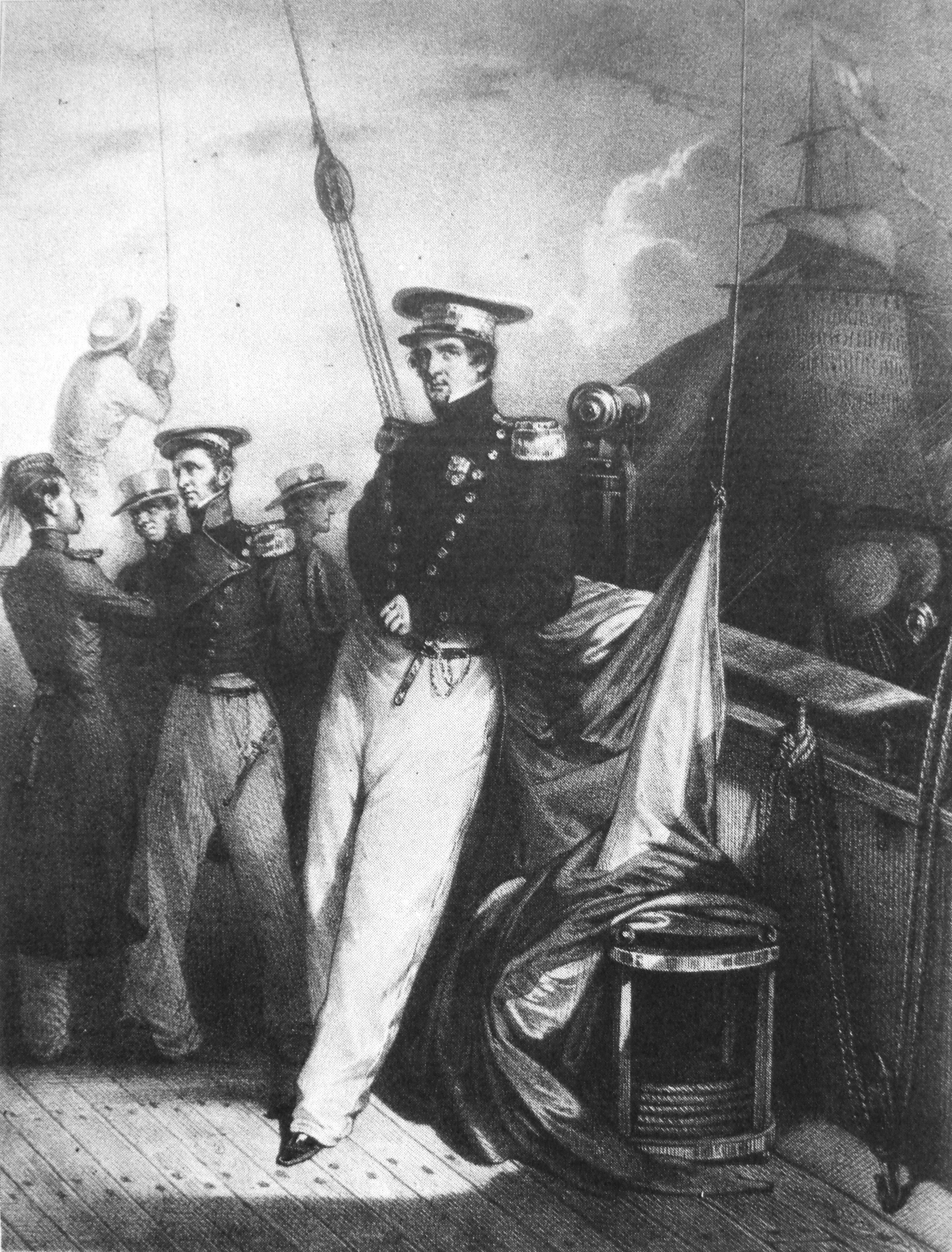
- Hyacinthe de Bougainville
- Born: 26 December 1781; Brest, France
- Died: 18 October 1846 (aged 64) Paris, France
- Allegiance: France
- Branch: French Navy
- Rank: Rear Admiral

Hyacinthe Yves Philippe Potentien, baron de Bougainville (French pronunciation: [jasɛ̃t iv filip pɔtɑ̃sjɛ̃ də buɡɛ̃vil]; 26 December 1781 – 18 October 1846) was a French naval officer. He was the son of Louis-Antoine de Bougainville. He became Rear-Admiral on 1 May 1838.

== Career ==
As a young second-class midshipman of eighteen Hyacinthe de Bougainville participated in the 1800-02 Baudin expedition to Australia.

Hyacinthe de Bougainville sailed around the world from 1824 to 1826 onboard Thétis and Espérance, sent by the Minister of the Navy and the Colonies, the duc de Clermont-Tonnerre. His main mission was a diplomatic one to reconnect with China, and Cochinchine (Vietnam).On those aspect, it was a failure, the Empereur of Cochinchine refused to meet with him, being afraid of the British reaction. In Australia, he obtained authorisation to build a monument for Laperouse, on a piece of land given by Sir Brisbane. He came back to France, very sad and demotivated, knowing that the British will dominate Oceania and South Pacific for generations, France arriving too late.

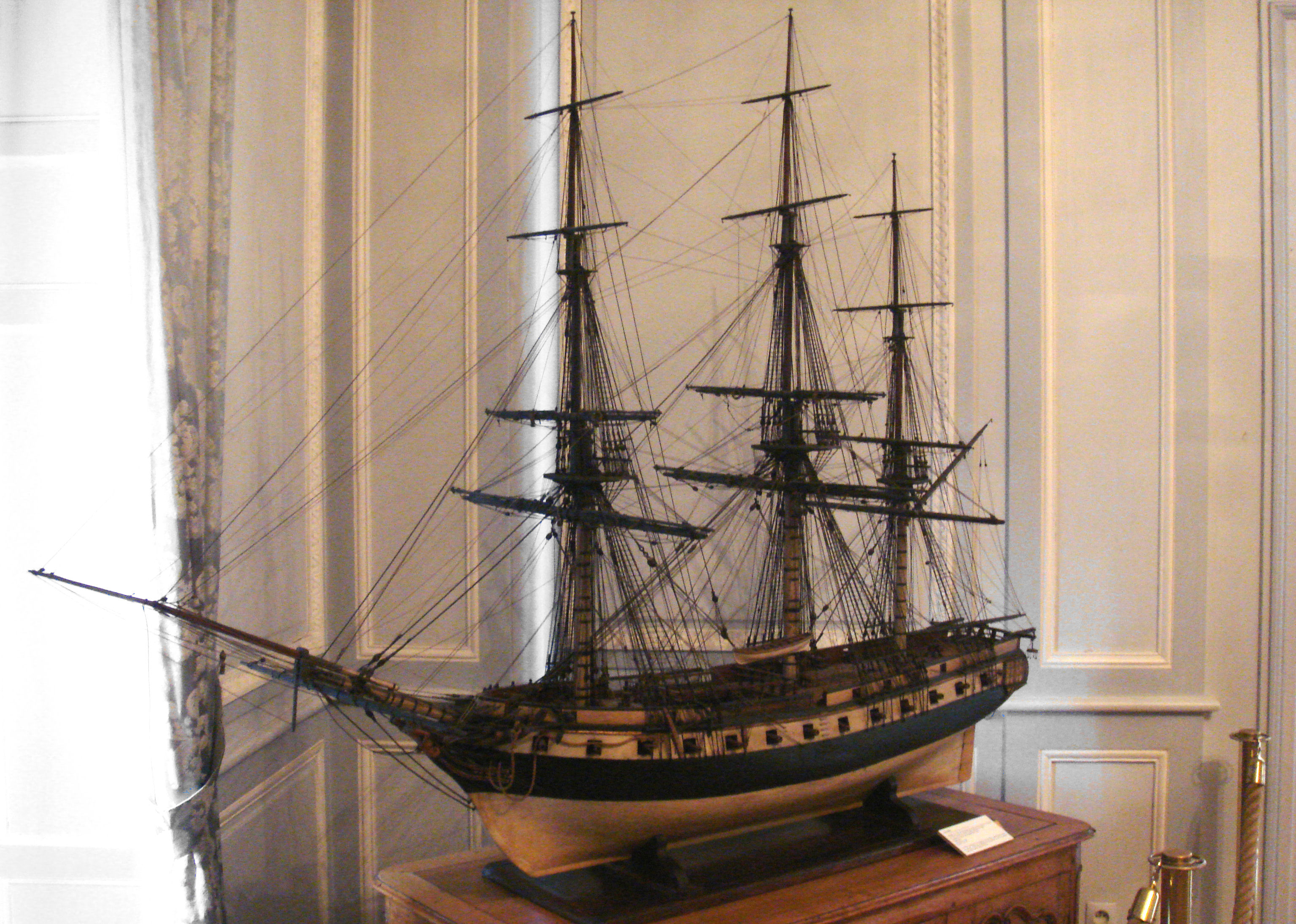
Frigate Thétis, 1813 model. Musée National de la Marine (Rochefort).

On 12 January 1825, Hyacinthe de Bougainville led an embassy to Vietnam with Captain Courson de la Ville-Hélio, arriving in Da Nang, with the warships Thétis and Espérance. Although they had numerous presents for the Emperor, and a 28 January 1824 letter from Louis XVIII, the ambassadors could not obtain an audience from Minh Mạng. Hyacinthe de Bougainville infiltrated Father Regéreau from the Thétis when it was anchored in Da Nang, triggering edicts of persecution against Christianity by Minh Mạng.

Bougainville visited New South Wales in 1825. That same year, he visited Port Jackson and Sydney where he set up a monument to La Pérouse and erected a grave for le Receveur in Botany Bay. He became acquainted with the leading colonial Sydney figures of the day including John Piper, Samuel Marsden, John Macarthur, and John Blaxland. The daughter of the latter, Harriot Blaxland Ritchie, became romantically involved with Bougainville.

== Works ==
Journal de la Navigation Autour Du Globe de la Frégate Thétis et de la Corvette L'Espérance (Paris : Arthus Bertrand) 1837.

== See also ==
- France-Vietnam relations
- European and American voyages of scientific exploration
