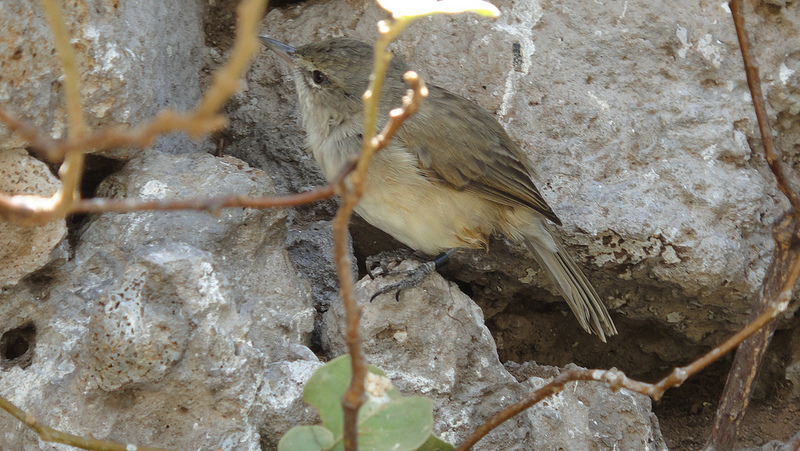
- On the island of Nīhoa, Northwestern Hawaiian Islands

Conservation status
- Critically Imperiled (NatureServe)

Scientific classification
- Kingdom: Animalia
- Phylum: Chordata
- Class: Aves
- Order: Passeriformes
- Family: Acrocephalidae
- Genus: Acrocephalus
- Species: A. familiaris
- Subspecies: A. f. kingi

Trinomial name
- Acrocephalus familiaris kingi (Wetmore, 1923)

= Nīhoa millerbird =

Subspecies of bird

The Nīhoa millerbird (Acrocephalus familiaris kingi), sometimes referred to by its Hawaiian name, ulūlu, is a subspecies of the millerbird. It gets its name from its preferred food, the Miller moth. The 5-inch (13 cm) long millerbird has dark, sepia-colored feathers, white belly, and dark beak. Its natural geographic range is limited to the tiny island of Nīhoa in the Northwestern Hawaiian Islands, and it is hoped that birds translocated to Laysan will help to ensure the survival of the species. The Nīhoa millerbird is one of the two endemic birds remaining on Nīhoa, the other being the Nīhoa finch.

Only 200–900 Nīhoa millerbirds persist on the island, making the species seriously endangered. It is at risk of extinction from environmental changes (droughts, fires, insect population irruptions), because flight away from the island would likely prove fatal. The Laysan millerbird, now extinct, was closely related.

The trinomial commemorates Samuel Wilder King, captain of the Tanager Expedition and later Governor of Hawaii.

== Conservation ==
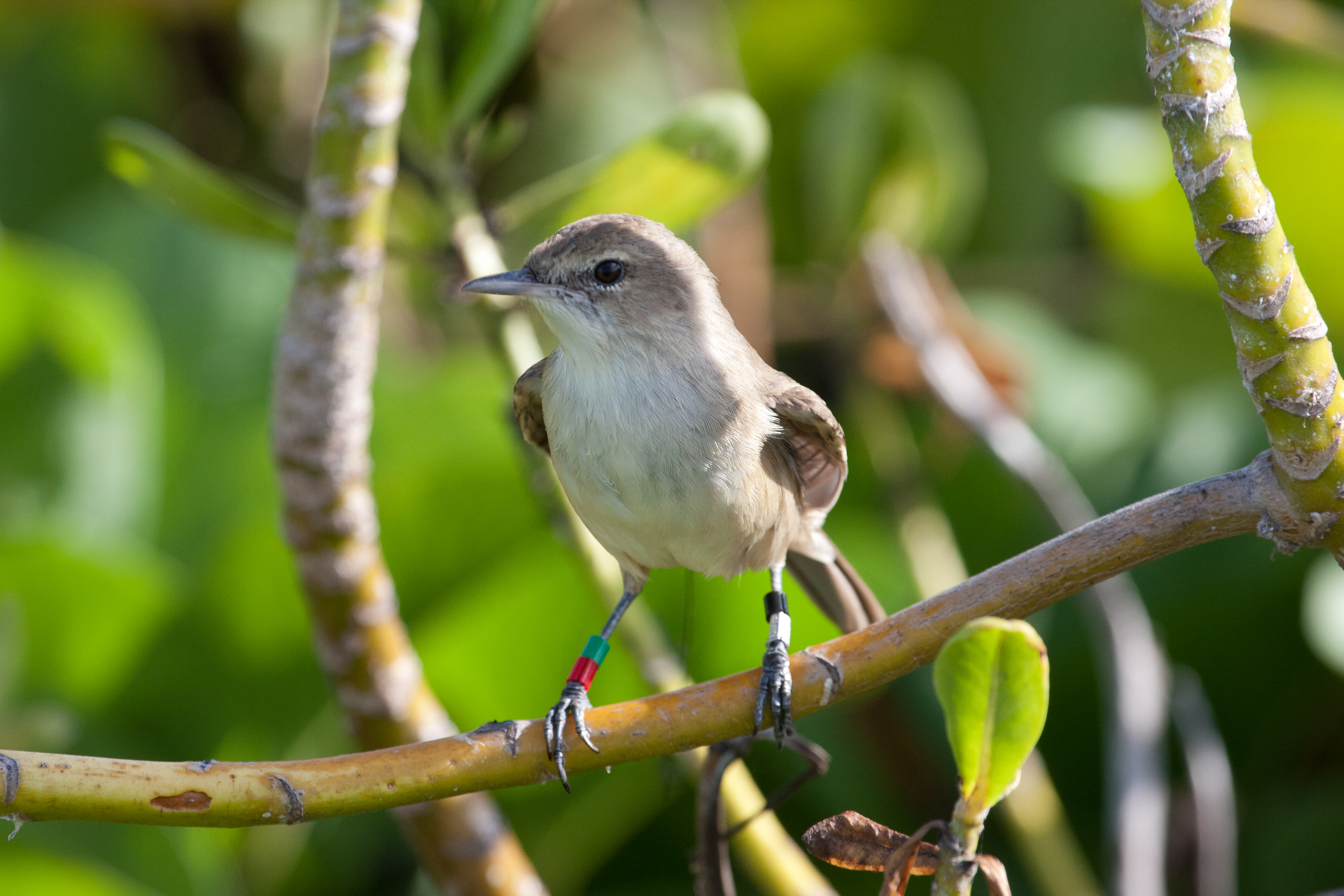
A millerbird wearing coloured leg bands shortly after translocation from Nīhoa to Laysan

Twenty-four Nīhoa millerbirds were translocated by ship about 650 miles (1,050 km) from Nīhoa to Laysan in September 2011 after years of planning with the aim of establishing a second population of the species on Laysan. Mark MacDonald, a graduate student from the University of New Brunswick in Canada, lead a team that was working with the US Fish & Wildlife Service to collect information needed for translocations. From July through September 2007, MacDonald and his team captured and banded Nīhoa millerbirds, collected body measurements, assessed body fat and breeding condition, identified individual territories and analyzed vocalizations, conducted feeding experiments, collected fecal samples, observed behavior to determine diet composition, noted the presence and abundance of non-native grasshoppers, and sampled the insect community on both Nīhoa and Laysan to assess the millerbird's potential prey base. MacDonald's study estimated the Nīhoa millerbird's population at approximately 800 individuals – a relatively high number in 40 years of low and fluctuating numbers. He believes that this could be attributed not only to high numbers of birds present during the survey period but also a larger survey area, the use of more experienced observers, or (most likely) the greater visibility of the birds during the late summer, when vegetation cover is most limited.

Using mist nets, 85 Nīhoa millerbirds (60 males and 25 females) were captured and banded. Banding permits identification of previously captured birds and reduces stress that can be caused by multiple captures. Most importantly, however, banding allows individual birds to be identified in the field and enables biologists to identify pairs, map their territories, and track individual survival from year to year through repeat sightings. Photographs and measurements of wing and tail feathers were taken from each individual, as well as small feather samples for genetic analysis. Growth bars visible on the tail feathers can help scientists determine the age of the bird, and comparison of photographs and measurements with results of lab analyses will aid in finding a way to sex Nīhoa millerbirds in the field. Development of these methods will ensure that the right numbers of male and female birds are moved to Laysan.

Several Nīhoa millerbirds were placed in a temporary enclosure and presented with a selection of island insects. The purpose was to identify millerbird dietary preferences and see if the birds would eat in captivity. Preliminary results showed that the birds fed readily from a plastic container of prey items. Of the choices offered, they left behind only lady bugs, sow-bugs, and ants. One bird was quick to chase down fast-moving cockroaches before taking smaller, slower insects such as spiders and beetles. Another test with a male and female showed that, after a brief adjustment period, the pair fed together without hesitation. Using an iPod and a speaker, the team played millerbird songs within the territories of all 60 banded males and recorded the responses with a microphone. These recordings were used to determine the territories of 20 males and will also be analyzed to determine if differences exist in millerbird songs across Nīhoa. Preliminary spectrograph analysis of the recordings shows variety among the songs of male millerbirds, but more research is needed to determine if these differences are significant. Identifying millerbird dialects on such a small spatial scale would be a novel finding and a major accomplishment of the expedition.

This work by MacDonald and his team brings the U.S. Fish and Wildlife Service one step closer to establishing a second population and greatly reducing the risk of extinction for the Nīhoa millerbird.

The birds were provided with different combinations of coloured leg bands to help identification of individual birds.
