= Capernwray Harbour Bible School =

Bible school and conference centre in British Columbia, Canada

Capernwray Harbour Bible Centre
- Motto: Proclaiming Jesus Christ as Life
- Type: Private
- Established: 1979
- Affiliations: Christian evangelical
- President: Chris Fordham
- Location: Thetis Island, British Columbia, Canada
- Campus: Rural, 97 acres
- Website: http://www.capernwray.ca

Capernwray Harbour Bible Centre is an evangelical Christian Bible School & Conference Centre located on Thetis Island, British Columbia, Canada.

The Centre was established by a Capernwray Hall alumnus, Charles Fordham, in 1979. The primary offering is a One-Year Bible School which runs from September to mid-April. During May - August over 4,000 participants are hosted for predominantly Christian-oriented conferences, retreats and Outdoor Education programmes.

The primary purpose and ministry of Capernwray Harbour is Christian education. Its goal is to offer students training in Bible study, evangelical outreach, leadership development, community living, and personal discovery through discipleship. According to school founder Charles Fordham, the mission of Capernwray Harbour is the "training of men and women to be equipped for full-time Christian service, regardless of their occupation," following the ideas expounded by Major W. Ian Thomas.

== History ==
The site of Capernwray Harbour Bible Centre was first settled by Henry Severn in 1886. Despite the school being named for Capernwray Harbour, it is in fact located on the shores of Preedy Harbour. Severn built a log cabin on the property; the subsequent owner, H. Burchell, added Preedy Hall, one of the largest buildings on the Gulf Islands at the time, and home to a store, a chapel, and a ballroom. In 1924 the property was sold to Hans Hunter, who built the Main Hall in 1926 after a fire. In 1979, Charles and Marlene Fordham formed a Board of Directors to begin operations for a Bible School on the site, signed a lease to purchase, and opened the school with an inaugural class of 77 students. Current School buildings and facilities include a gymnasium, lecture hall, outdoor amphitheatre, climbing tower, several kilometres of trails, and accommodations for 150.

== Mission statement ==
At Capernwray Harbour, men and women are trained in a working knowledge of Christ. This training includes knowing Christ more deeply and personally as indwelling Lord, and studying, meditating in, and communicating the Written Word of God. The purpose of this training is to discover within daily experience the full reality of the Christian life, to prove that reality, Christ's life, in and through us. This training also aims to increase our effectiveness as members of our own local churches, so we are equipped for full-time Christian service, regardless of occupation.

== Statement of Faith ==
The Capernwray Harbour Statement of Faith asserts that God created man in such a way that the presence of God as Creator within a man as creature is imperative to his humanity, and that we as men can do nothing without him. Furthermore, according to the "Regenerative Purpose of God", Christ "rose again from the dead to live his life in us."

The Statement of Faith also declares that once one has truly assumed the Christian life, "Christ can then do the work in us as the Father then did the work in Him, and we let all God loose in the world; not, then just the sky, but God Himself is the limit!"

Ultimately, according to the Statement of Faith, "Jesus Christ established the fact that our spiritual union with him, as he was in spiritual union with the Father, is the true and ultimate basis of all evangelism, missions and Church planting."

== Programmes ==
One of the principal ideas forwarded by Major Thomas, "simplicity in Christ", is emphasized in the curriculum at Capernwray Harbour. Students are encouraged to engage in discipleship to enable personal discovery, rather than looking for academic merit in Bible study. Thomas wrote, "If there is any situation from which you are not prepared to step back, in recognition of the total adequacy of Christ who is in you, then you are out of the will of God."

=== Curriculum ===
The Capernwray Harbour's Bible School curriculum covers about seventy-five percent of all of the Biblical books. Essential to the Capernwray Harbour approach are the creation of journals, (ungraded summaries of lecture principles), and study projects, presentations which ensure a thorough study of the Bible and the ability to impart teachings to others.

=== Ventures ===
A variety of camping and recreational programmes are offered to students in the initial autumn weekends of Bible School. These Venture Programme activities are designed to establish relationships between the new students. The programmes are conducted at a variety of regional recreational areas and ecological preserves, such as Carmanah Walbran Park, and the Pacific Rim National Park Reserve.

=== Outreach ===
Outreach programmes for students involve visits to several elementary schools, First Nations reserves, youth drop-in centres and senior facilities. Additionally, students lead monthly church services in a medium-security prison in nearby Nanaimo. Spring break outreach programs have included ministries to Seattle USA, Mexico, Japan, India, Philippines, Israel, and Italy.

=== Community Life ===
Capernwray Harbour hosts a variety of intramural sports, including soccer, basketball, floor hockey, and volleyball. Students have opportunities to participate in other outdoor adventures such as climbing wall activities, ropes course challenges, biking and mountain hiking. Students can also organize individual team games in their free time.

== Other Capernwray Harbour Programmes ==
=== Conferences and Holiday Bible Weeks ===
Capernwray Harbour hosts several conferences throughout the year, including the Men's Conference, Ladies Conferences, and the Pastors & Ministry Leaders Conference. Retreats are offered for families, church groups, seniors groups, and those wishing for personal getaways.

The Holiday Bible Weeks are attended by families and individuals who want to have a Christian vacation experience. Christ-centred devotionals and talks round out a program that includes several outdoor activity options each day.

The Holiday Bible Weeks outdoor recreational activities include ocean kayaking, waterskiing, Gulf Islands boat tours, trail hiking, trout fishing, and beachcombing. Team events such as ropes course challenges and beach volleyball are available to participants of all ages, from preschool to adult. Facilities include a fully equipped gymnasium, five kilometres of beach and forest trails, 32 stations on two challenge courses, and a 14-metre climbing wall/rappelling tower.

The devotional services are conducted in several meeting areas, which include the gymnasium, the lecture hall, and an outdoor amphitheatre.

=== Outdoor Education Programme ===
The Capernwray Harbour outdoor education programme takes advantage of many of the same facilities, but is geared toward youth aged 10 to 18. The outdoor education focusses on problem solving, communication skills, leadership, community, and teambuilding.
