= Greek ship Doxa =

At least three ships of the Hellenic Navy have borne the name Doxa (Greek: Δόξα, "Glory"):

- Greek destroyer Doxa (1906) a Niki-class destroyer launched in 1906 and sunk in 1917.
- Greek destroyer Doxa (D20) a Gleaves-class destroyer launched in 1940 as USS Ludlow she was transferred to Greece in 1951 and renamed. She was scrapped in 1972.
- Greek gunboat Doxa (P63) a Thetis-class gunboat commissioned in the German Navy in 1962 as Najade she was transferred to Greece in 1991 and renamed. She was decommissioned in 2010.
