= Téthys Consortium =

- Téthys – Consortium of Mediterranean Universities
- Téthys – Consortium des Universités Méditerranéennes
- Named after: Tethys
- Formation: January 28, 2000; 26 years ago
- Founded at: Barcelona, Spain
- Type: International academic network
- Headquarters: Aix-en-Provence, France
- Coordinates: 43°30′58″N 5°26′52″E
- Members: 80+ (2025)
- President: Camille de Garidel-Thoron; Aix-Marseille University
- Main organ: General Assembly
- Website: tethys.univ-amu.fr

The Téthys – Consortium of Mediterranean Universities (French: Téthys – Consortium des Universités Méditerranéennes) is an international network of universities from the Mediterranean region, established to promote academic cooperation, scientific research, and cultural exchange among countries along the shores of the Mediterranean Sea.

The Téthys consortium was founded on 28 January 2000 at the initiative of Aix-Marseille University, within the framework of implementing the principles of the 1995 Barcelona Declaration, which encouraged Euro-Mediterranean collaboration in education, science, and culture. Initially comprising 22 universities, the network has expanded significantly over the past two decades.

Today, Téthys brings together 87 universities from 21 countries, including members from southern Europe, the Maghreb, and the Mashreq. The consortium serves as a platform for knowledge exchange, student and staff mobility, and the development of joint educational and research projects.

The network's headquarters and coordination are based at Aix-Marseille University, which plays a central role in the strategic management of the consortium. Téthys organises annual assemblies, thematic seminars, and workshops, including projects such as HERMES and AfriConnect+, funded by European programmes.

== See also ==
- Union for the Mediterranean
