= Thetis Island =

Island in British Columbia, Canada

Coordinates: 48°59′54″N 123°40′51″W

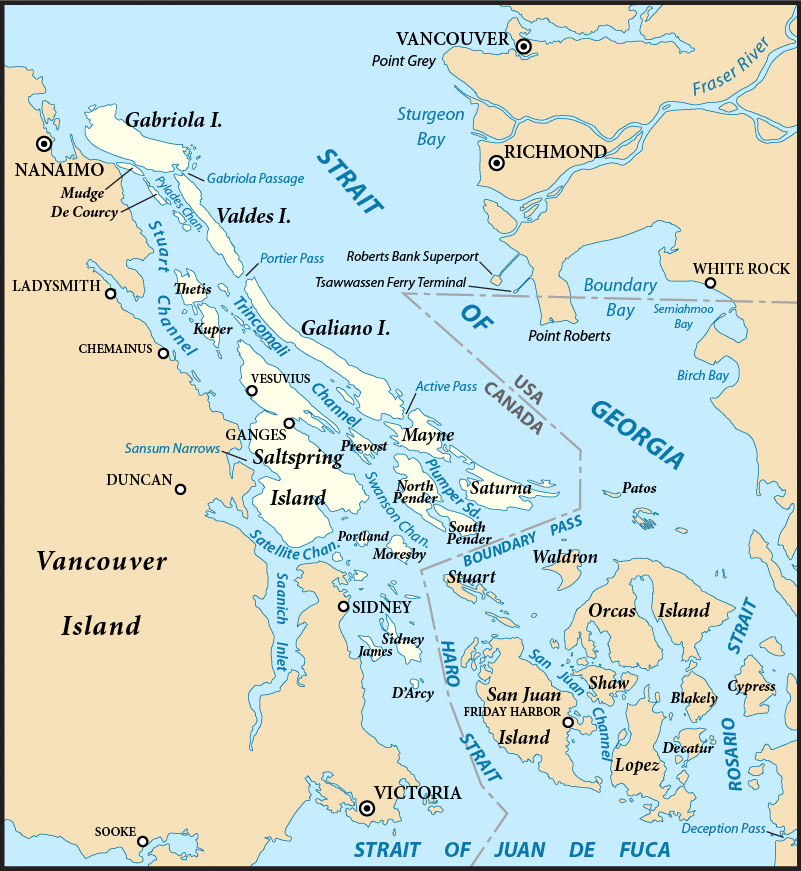
Thetis Island location in the Strait of Georgia

Thetis Island (population: 379) is an island and unincorporated community off the coast of British Columbia, Canada, lying between Vancouver Island, which is to the west across Stuart Channel, and the west from the north tip of Galiano Island, from which it is separated by Trincomali Channel. With its immediate southern neighbour Penelakut Island (formerly Kuper Island), it is one of the Gulf Islands. Thetis island is 2,560 acres (10.36 km^{2}) in size. It is approximately two miles (3.2 kilometres) wide and three miles (4.8 kilometres) long north to south. Two north to south land ridges define the east and west sides of the island. Burchell Hill is 503 feet above sea level, and forms the high point on the west side of Thetis island, and Moore Hill is 511 feet above sea level, and forms the high point ridge on the east side of the island.

== Etymology ==
The island was named in 1851 after HMS Thetis, a 36-gun Royal Navy frigate commanded by Captain Augustus Kuper (after whom Kuper Island was formerly named). The ship was named after the Nereid Thetis from Greek mythology.

== History ==
Before contact, two Cowichan tribes inhabited Thetis Island, the Yekolaos and the Lilmalche.

Thetis was first settled by Europeans in 1874 but permanent settlement took hold in the 1890s and 1900s. One of the early families on Thetis Island was the Hunter family. In 1891 Peter & Joseph Hunter purchased lot 27 from Mr. Walls, and then a couple of years later, lot 18 from Olaf Gustafson. Descendants of Peter Hunter continue to live on the northern coast of the island.

== Services ==
Among the homes and seasonal cabins of Thetis Island are two Christian organizations: Capernwray Harbour Bible School and Pioneer Pacific Camp. In the summer, various art- and science-based educational events are run by the Thetis Island Nature Conservancy (ThINC) through the Nature House program, located at The Portal, a 70-acre waterfront property dedicated to nature education, stewardship, conservation and local food production. There are also two marinas, Telegraph Harbour with a bistro and Thetis Island marina with a restaurant/pub, a small convenience store with post office, and several bed and breakfast on the island. Thetis Island also operates one of the few one-room schoolhouses left in Canada.

== Climate ==
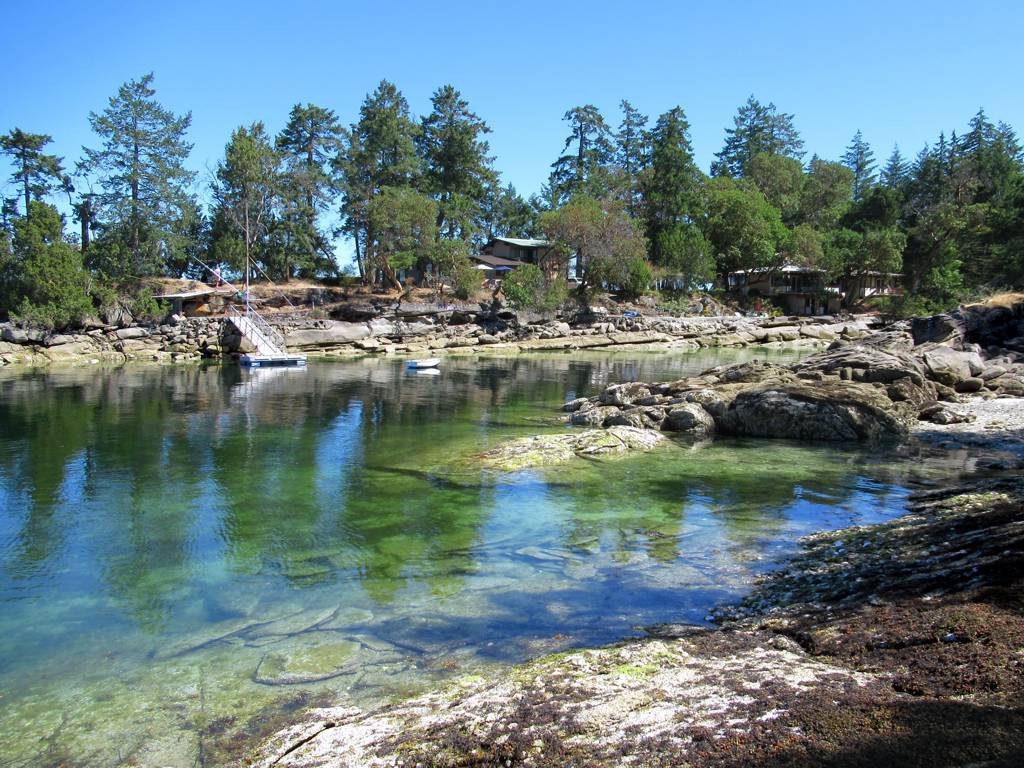
Pilkey Point

Thetis Island has a mild climate experiencing less rainfall than the western coast of Vancouver Island as it lies in the rain shadow of Vancouver Island. Vegetation on the island includes many arbutus, Douglas fir and western red cedar. Pilkey Point offers islanders and visitors a great view of the ocean and is a popular attraction.

== See also ==
- List of islands of British Columbia
- List of communities in British Columbia
- Thetis (disambiguation)
