= HNLMS Thetis =

History

Netherlands
- Name: Thetis
- Namesake: Thetis
- Operator: Royal Netherlands Navy
- Builder: Koninklijke Maatschappij De Schelde, Vlissingen
- Laid down: 12 October 1982
- Launched: 27 January 1983
- Commissioned: 14 March 1985
- Out of service: 2017
- Fate: Scrapped in 2022

General characteristics
- Type: Accommodation ship
- Displacement: 800 t (790 long tons)
- Length: 68 m (223 ft 1 in)
- Beam: 12 m (39 ft 4 in)
- Notes: There was room aboard to accommodate 126 persons

HNLMS Thetis (A887) was a accommodation ship of the Royal Netherlands Navy. It was used as a diving and disassembly school.

== Construction ==
Thetis was built at the Koninklijke Maatschappij De Schelde (KMS) between 1982 and 1985. The Dutch government awarded KMS the order to build the ship because the company had at the time overcapacity and therefore needed orders to prevent layoffs.

== Service history ==
In 1990 Thetis was used to provide further training to 25 doctors from 13 different countries. These doctors learned during the course how to provide help underwater. At the same time the Royal Netherlands Navy also offered to train divers of the Dutch fire departments how to handle during underwater accidents.

In December 2021 Thesis was removed from Nieuwe Haven Naval Base, after being rejected in 2017. The following year it was decided that the ship would be scrapped. Thetis will be replaced by a floating platform consisting of two pontoons, which will be named Thesis II. However, before the floating platform can moor at the intended place in the Nieuwe Haven Naval Base it will first be brought to the right depth. In December 2025 it was reported that two floating platforms will be built instead, with one platform being named Uhlenbeck and the other Thetis.
