= French frigate Thétis (1819) =

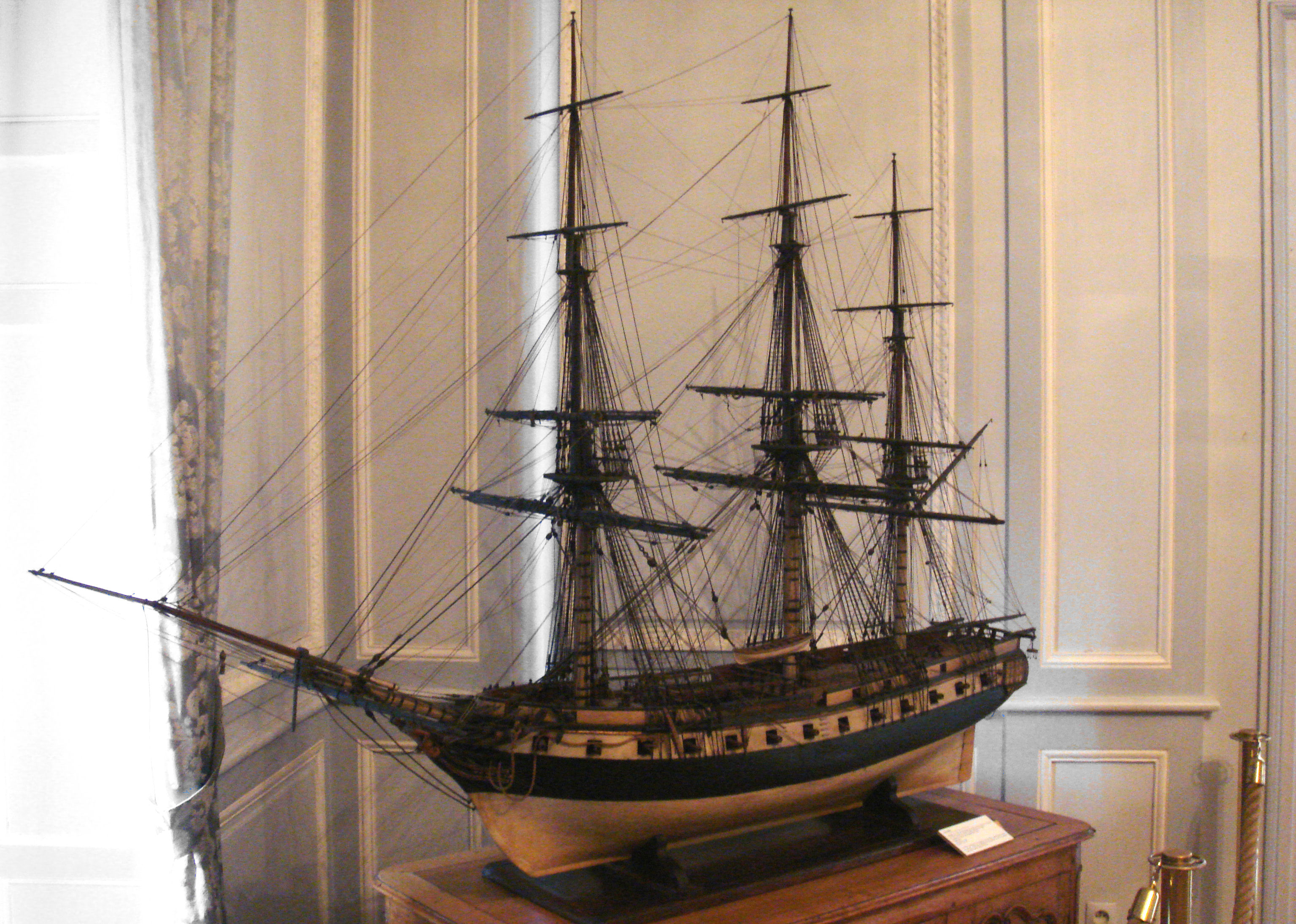
- Model of Thétis on display at the Musée de la Marine de Rochefort

History

France
- Name: Thétis
- Namesake: Thetis
- Builder: Toulon
- Laid down: 1814
- Launched: 3 May 1819
- Out of service: 13 December 1853
- Fate: Broken up 1866

General characteristics
- Sail plan: Full-rigged ship
- Armament: 44 guns

Thétis was a 44-gun frigate of the French Navy.

== Career ==
Commissioned in Toulon on 8 March 1822, Thétis crossed to Brest in late 1822. From December 1822 to October 1823, she cruised the Caribbean before circumnavigating the planet, under Captain Hyacinthe de Bougainville. From 1824 to 1826, she served in the Indian Ocean along with Espérance, again sailing around the globe.

Thétis took part in the Invasion of Algiers in 1830. From 1832 to 1847, she was in various states of commission, and from 1851 she was used as a schoolship for cabin boys. In 1865, she was renamed to Laninon (to free up the name for the armoured corvette Thétis) and used as a coal depot.

The ship was broken up in 1866.
