= French ship Thétis =

Twelve ships of the French Navy have borne the name Thétis in honour of nereid and sea nymph Thetis:

== Ships ==
- French ship Thétis (1697), a 44-gun ship of the line
- French frigate Thétis (1705), a 40-gun frigate
- French frigate Thétis (1722), a 26-gun frigate
- French frigate Thétis (1751), a 26-gun Topaze-class frigate
- French frigate Thétis (1788), a 40-gun Nymphe-class frigate
- French corvette Thétis (1793), a 10-gun corvette
- French frigate Thétis (1819), a 44-gun frigate
- French ironclad Thétis (1868), an Alma-class armoured corvette
- French torpedo boat Thétis (1916), a German-built Doris-class torpedo boat taken from the Greek Navy at Salamis Island in 1916.
- Thétis (1920), a water tanker
- French submarine Thétis (1927), a Circé-class submarine.
- French minesweeper Thétis (1988), an experimental minesweeper.
Ships of the French Navy named Thétis
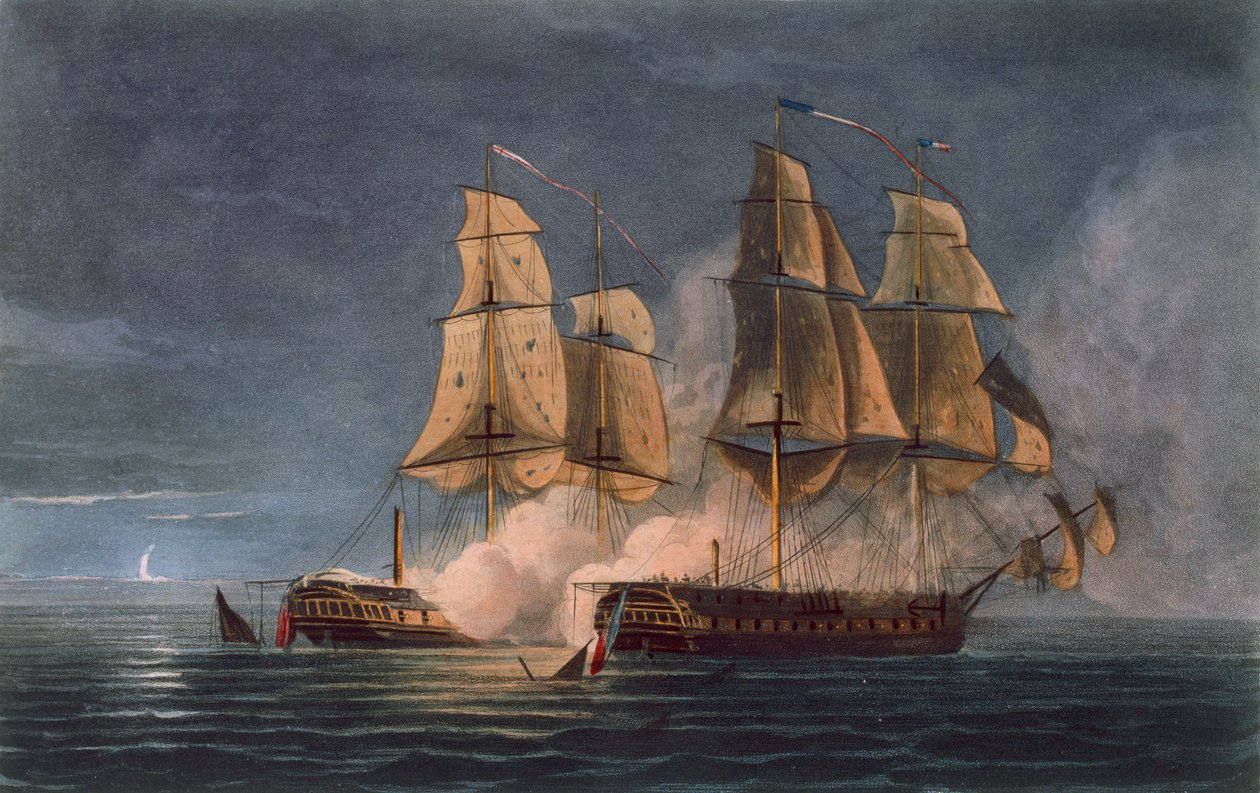
Battle between Thétis and HMS Amethyst on 10 November 1808

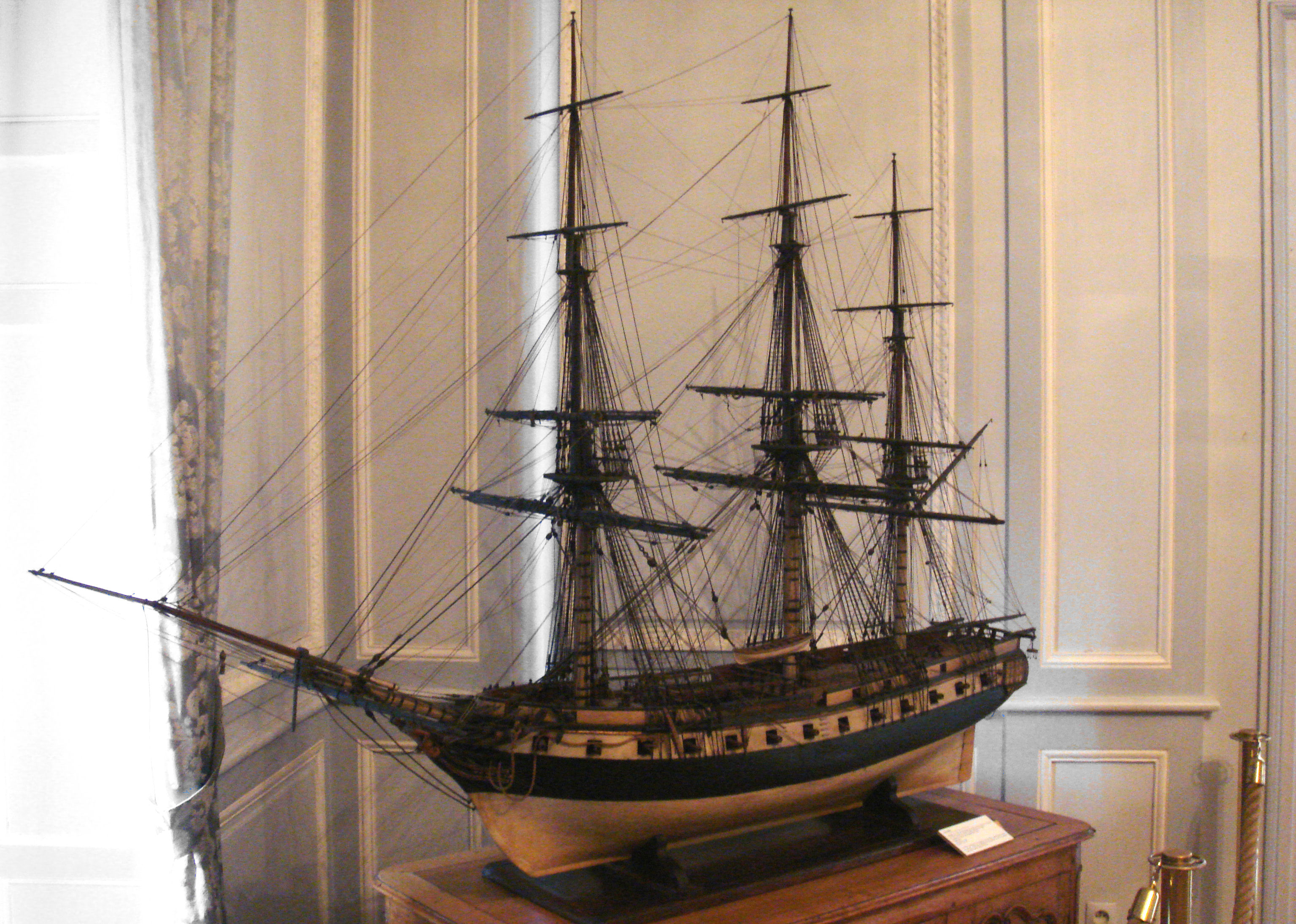
Model of Thétis (1819)

== See also ==
- HMS Thetis

== Notes and references ==
=== Bibliography ===
- Roche, Jean-Michel (2005). Dictionnaire des bâtiments de la flotte de guerre française de Colbert à nos jours. Vol. 1. Group Retozel-Maury Millau. pp. 436–437. ISBN 978-2-9525917-0-6. OCLC 165892922.
- Roche, Jean-Michel (2005). Dictionnaire des bâtiments de la flotte de guerre française de Colbert à nos jours. Vol. 2. Group Retozel-Maury Millau. p. 467. ISBN 978-2-9525917-0-6. OCLC 165892922.
