= HMS Thetis =

Twelve ships of the Royal Navy have borne the name HMS Thetis, named after the sea-nymph in Greek mythology:

- HMS Thetis (1717) was a 22-gun storeship launched in 1717. Her fate is unknown.
- HMS Thetis (1747) was a 44-gun fifth rate launched in 1747. She became a hospital ship in 1757 and was sold in 1767.
- HMS Thetis (1773) was a 32-gun fifth rate launched in 1773 and wrecked entering the Careenage at St. Lucia Bay in 1781.
- HMS Thetis (1782) was a 38-gun fifth rate launched in 1782 and sold in 1814.
- HMS Thetis (1796 schooner) was an 8-gun schooner purchased in 1796 and listed until 1800.
- HMS Thetis was a 24-gun sixth rate that the Royal Navy captured from the Dutch at Demerara in 1796 and later scuttled there. She was a Dutch 7th Charter frigate built at Amsterdam and launched in 1785. Her dimensions, in Dutch feet of 11 Rotterdam inches, were: 125' 7/11" x 34' x 13' 2/11".
- HMS Thetis (1810) was a 10-gun gun-brig launched in 1810 and on the lists until at least 1836.
- HMS Thetis (1817) was a 46-gun fifth rate launched in 1817 and wrecked off Arraial do Cabo (near Cape Frio) in 1830.
- HMS Thetis (1846) was a 36-gun fifth rate launched in 1846 and transferred to Prussia in 1855 in exchange for two gunboats.
- HMS Thetis (1871) was a Briton-class wooden screw corvette launched in 1871 and sold in 1887.
- HMS Thetis (1890) was an Apollo-class second-class protected cruiser launched in 1890. She was used as a minelayer from 1907 and was sunk in 1918 as a blockship at Zeebrugge.
- HMS Thetis (N25) was a T-class submarine launched in 1938. She sank during trials but was salvaged and recommissioned as HMS Thunderbolt. The Italian corvette Cicogna sank Thunderbolt in 1943.

== See also ==
- Thetis Island
- Thetis Lake
- French ship Thétis
