= Lake Doxa =

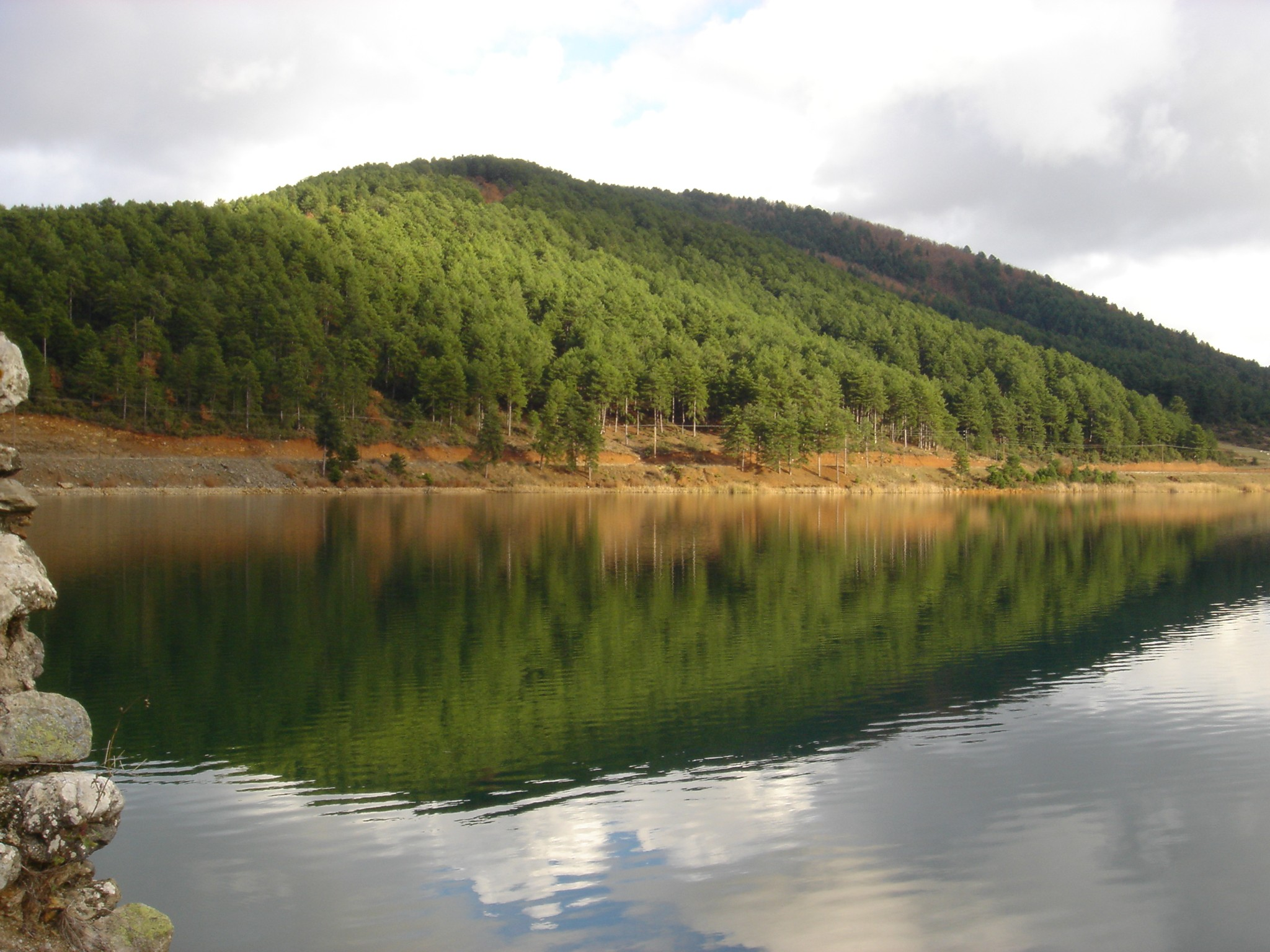

- Location within Peloponnese
- Location: West Feneos, Korinthia
- Coordinates: 37°55′45″N 22°17′11″E
- Lake type: Reservoir
- Basin countries: Greece
- Max. length: 1.5 km (0.93 mi)
- Max. width: 300 to 1,000 m (980 to 3,280 ft)
- Surface area: about 0.5 km^{2} (0.19 sq mi)
- Max. depth: 30 to 40 m (98 to 131 ft)
- Surface elevation: 900 m (3,000 ft)

Lake Doxa (Greek: Λίμνη Δόξα, romanized: Limni Doxa) is an artificial lake in western Corinthia, Greece. It is situated at an elevation of 900 m, in the municipal unit Feneos, near the village Archaia Feneos. Construction was completed in the late 1990s. It is fed and drained by the small river Doxa (Δόξα), which empties into the plain of Feneos. In the heart of the lake on a small peninsula features a small church of Agios Fanourios. The Saint George Monastery in Feneos was relocated to higher ground, north of the lake. The lake is surrounded by oak and Pune forests.

== Gallery ==
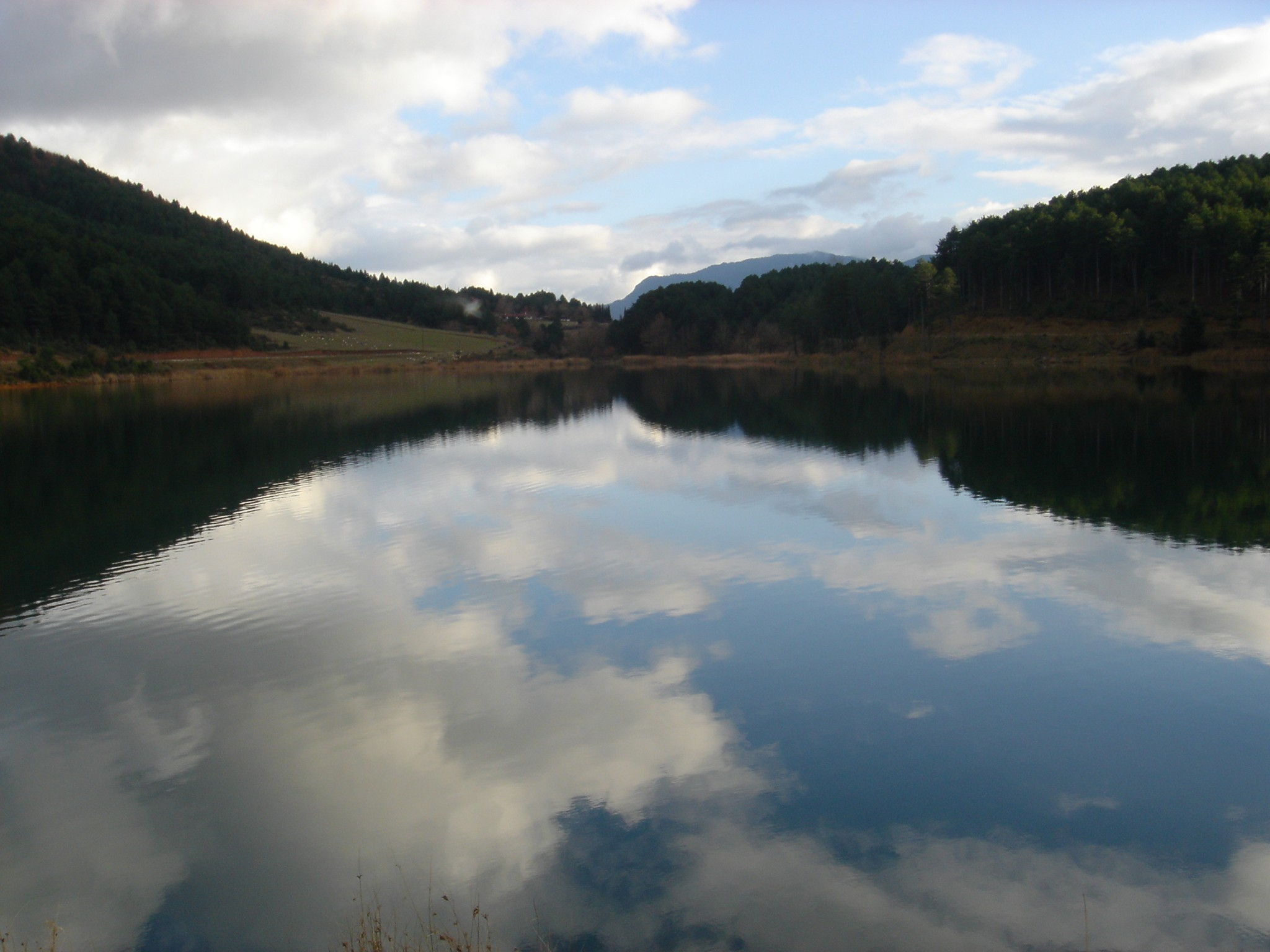
Lake Doxa, Korinthia

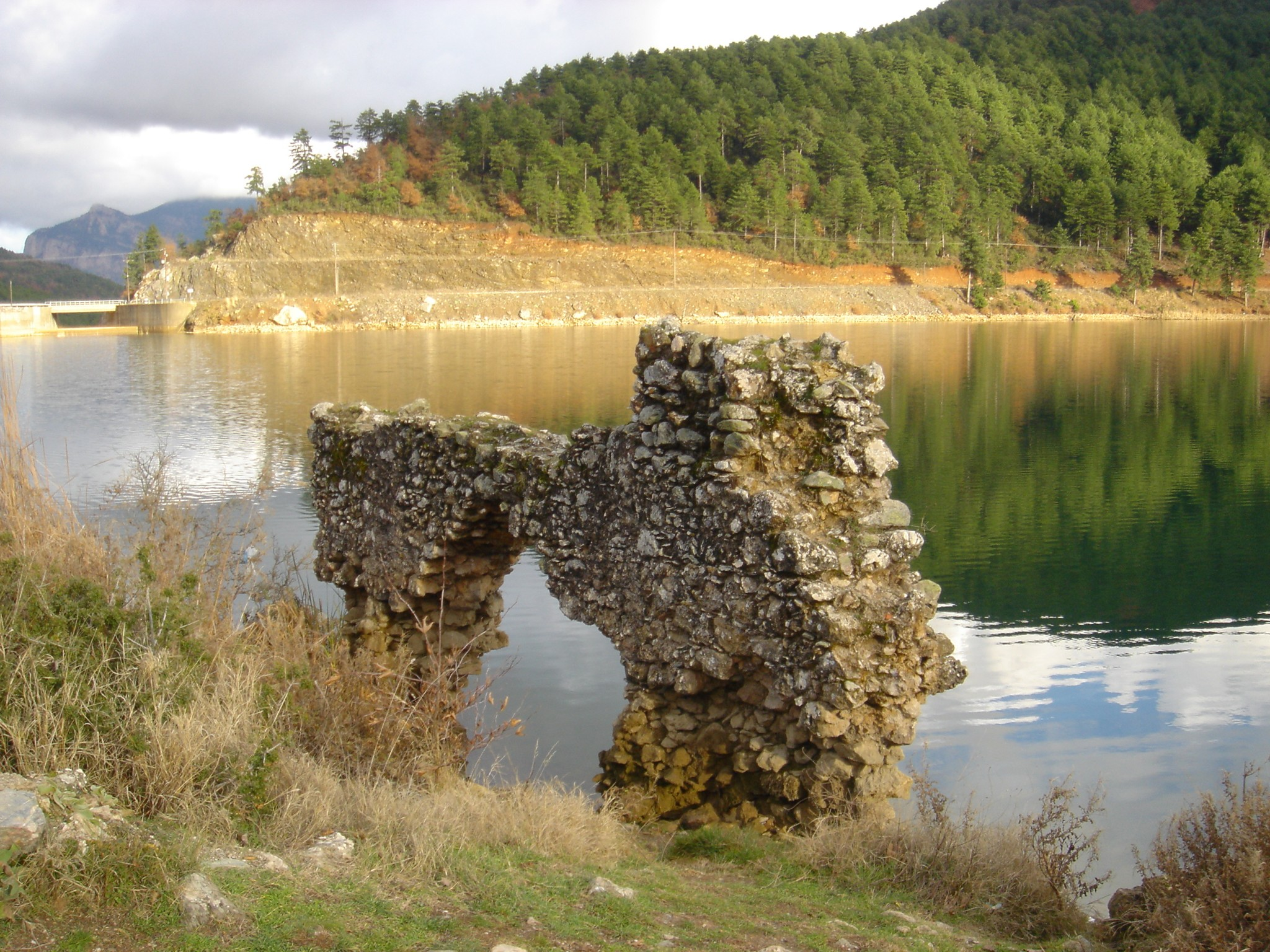
Lake Doxa

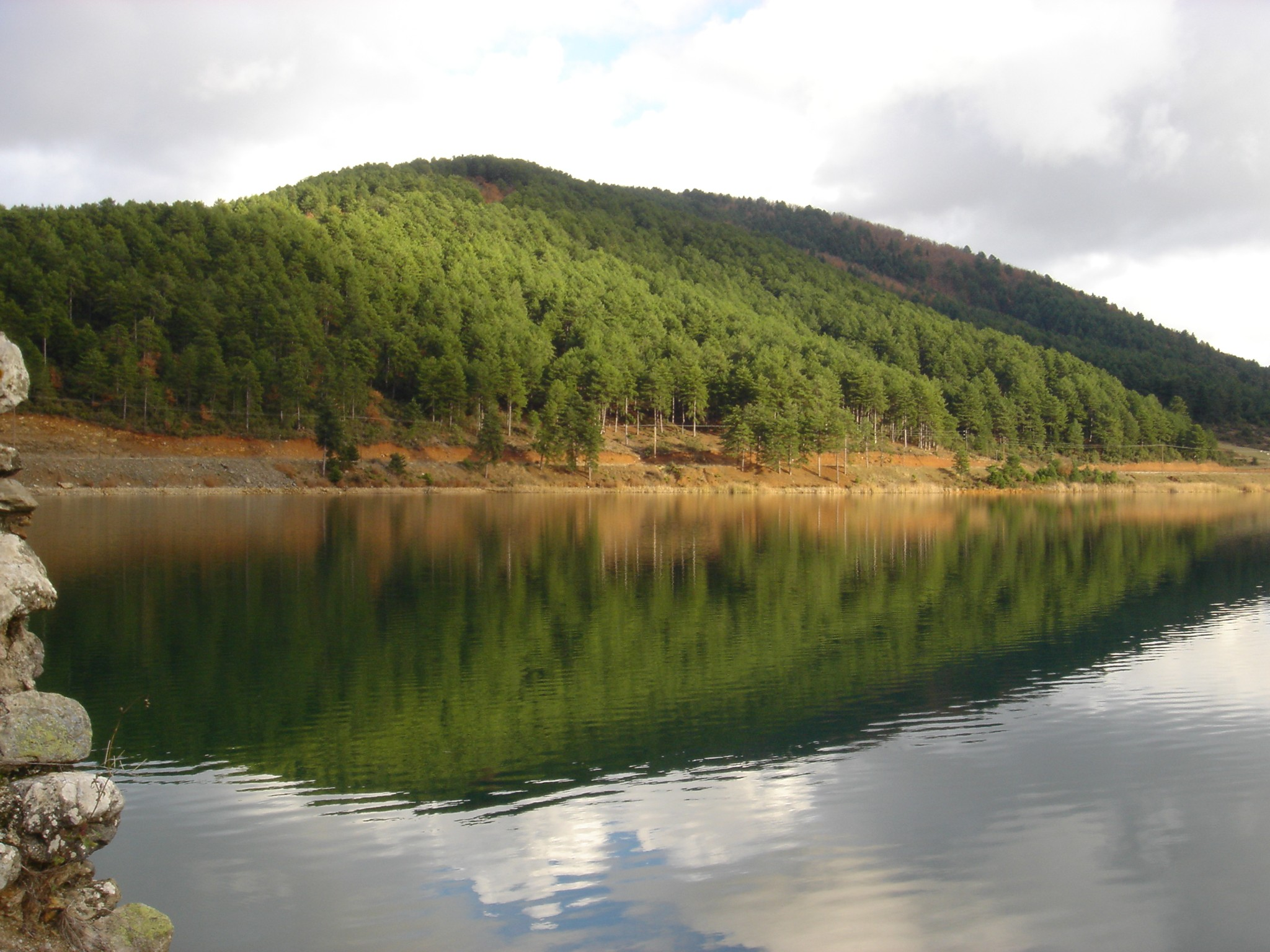
Lake Doxa

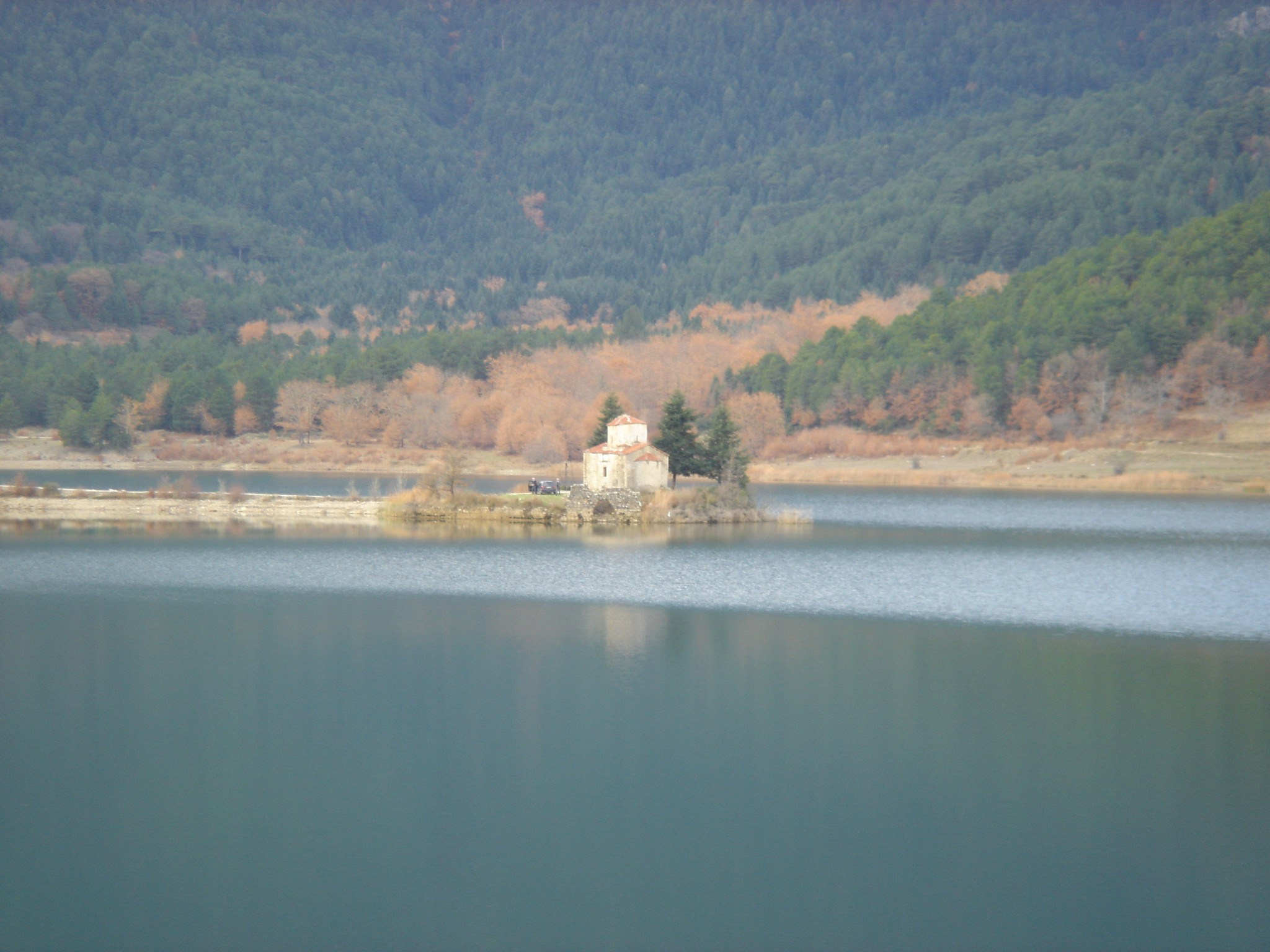
Lake Doxa - Agios Fanourios

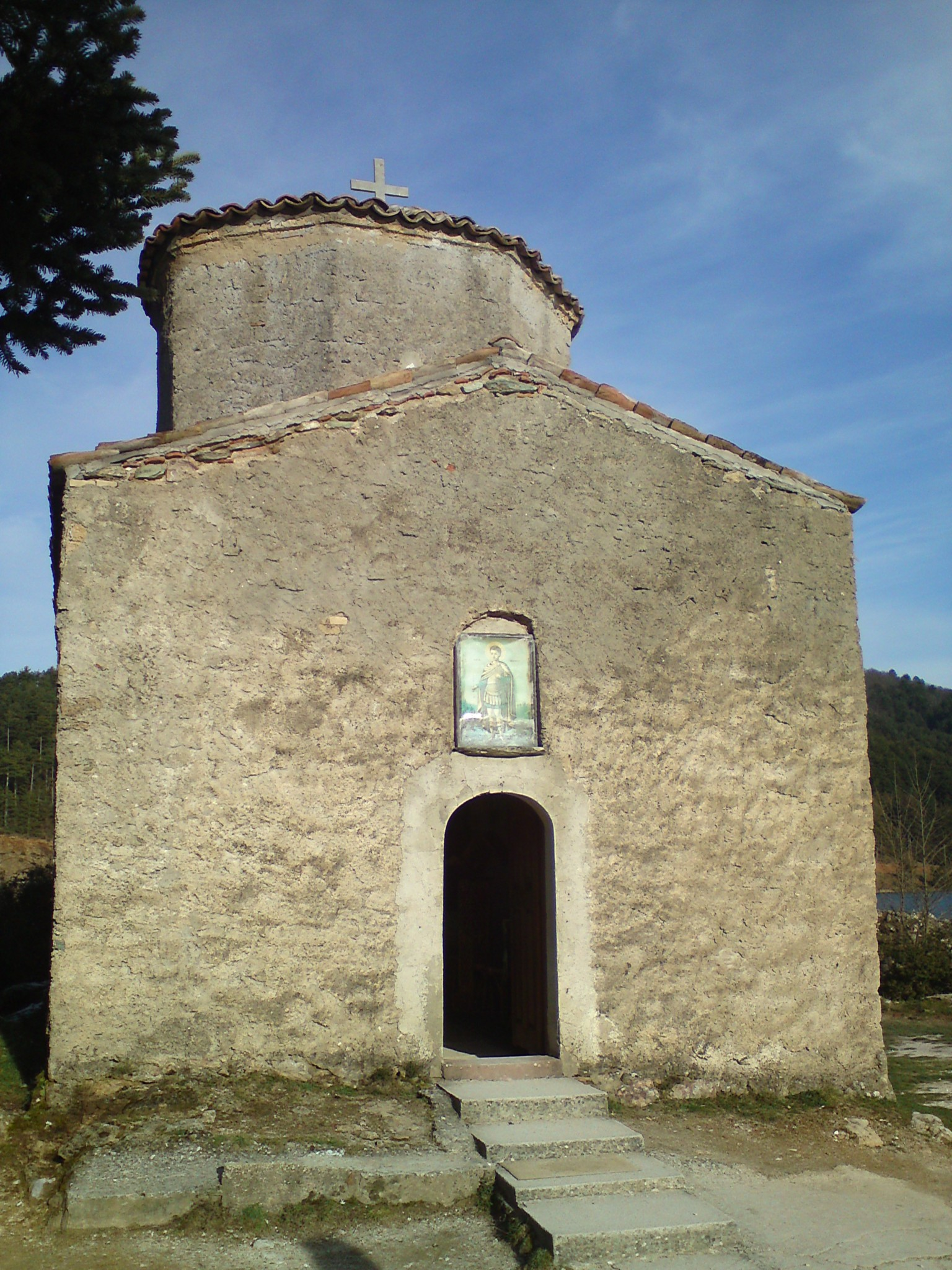
Agios Fanourios church

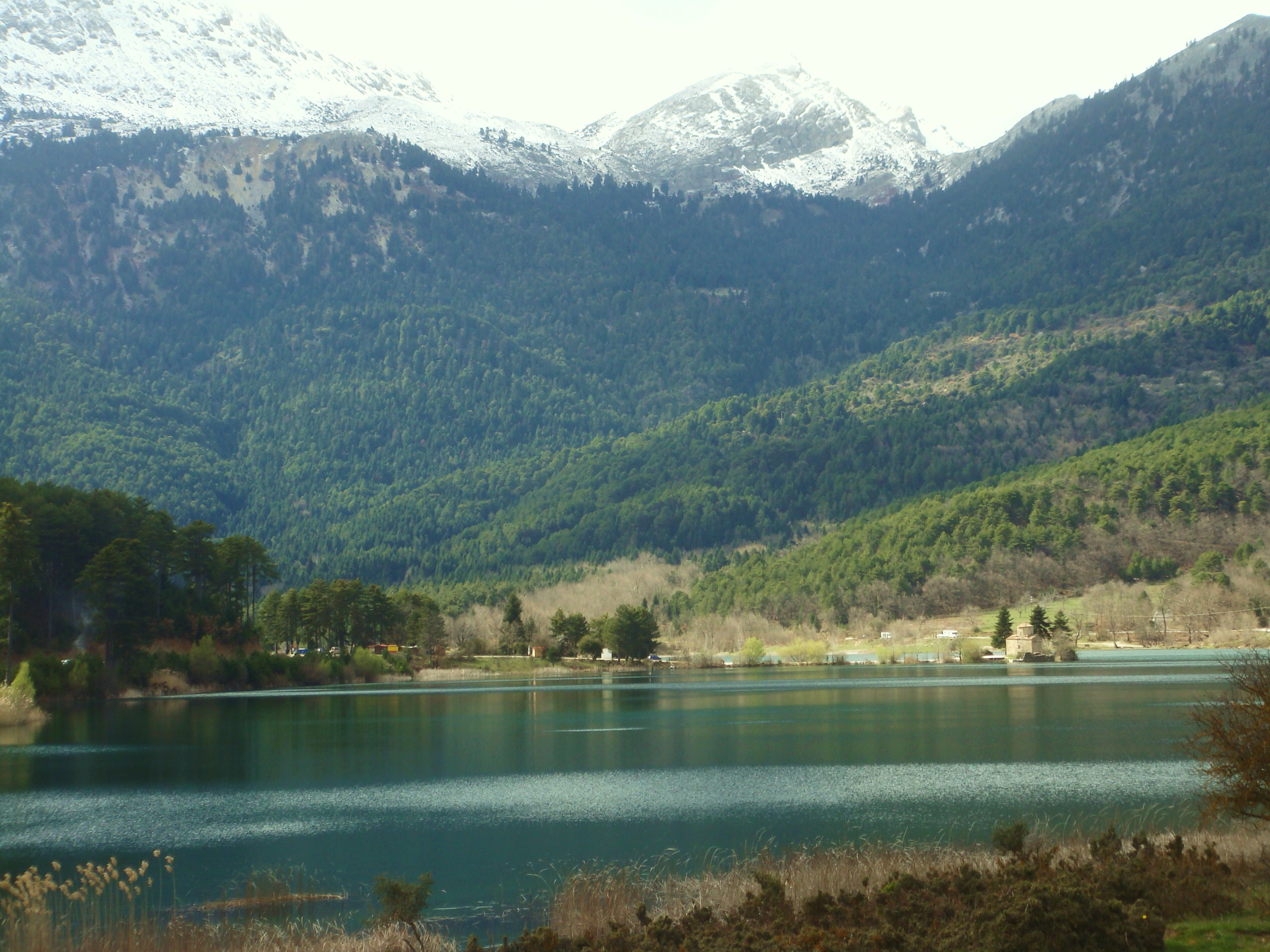
Lake Doxa

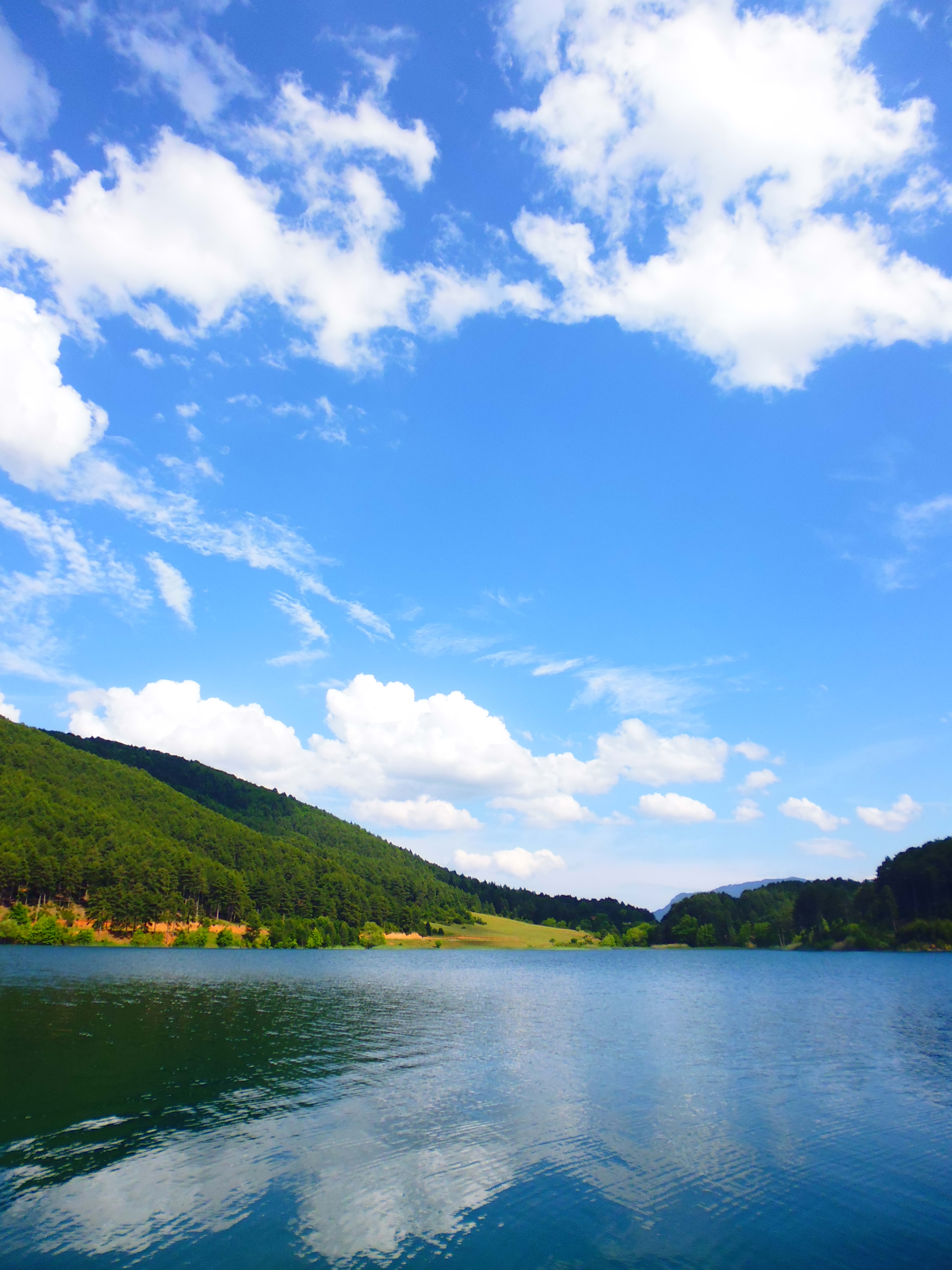
Lake Doxa

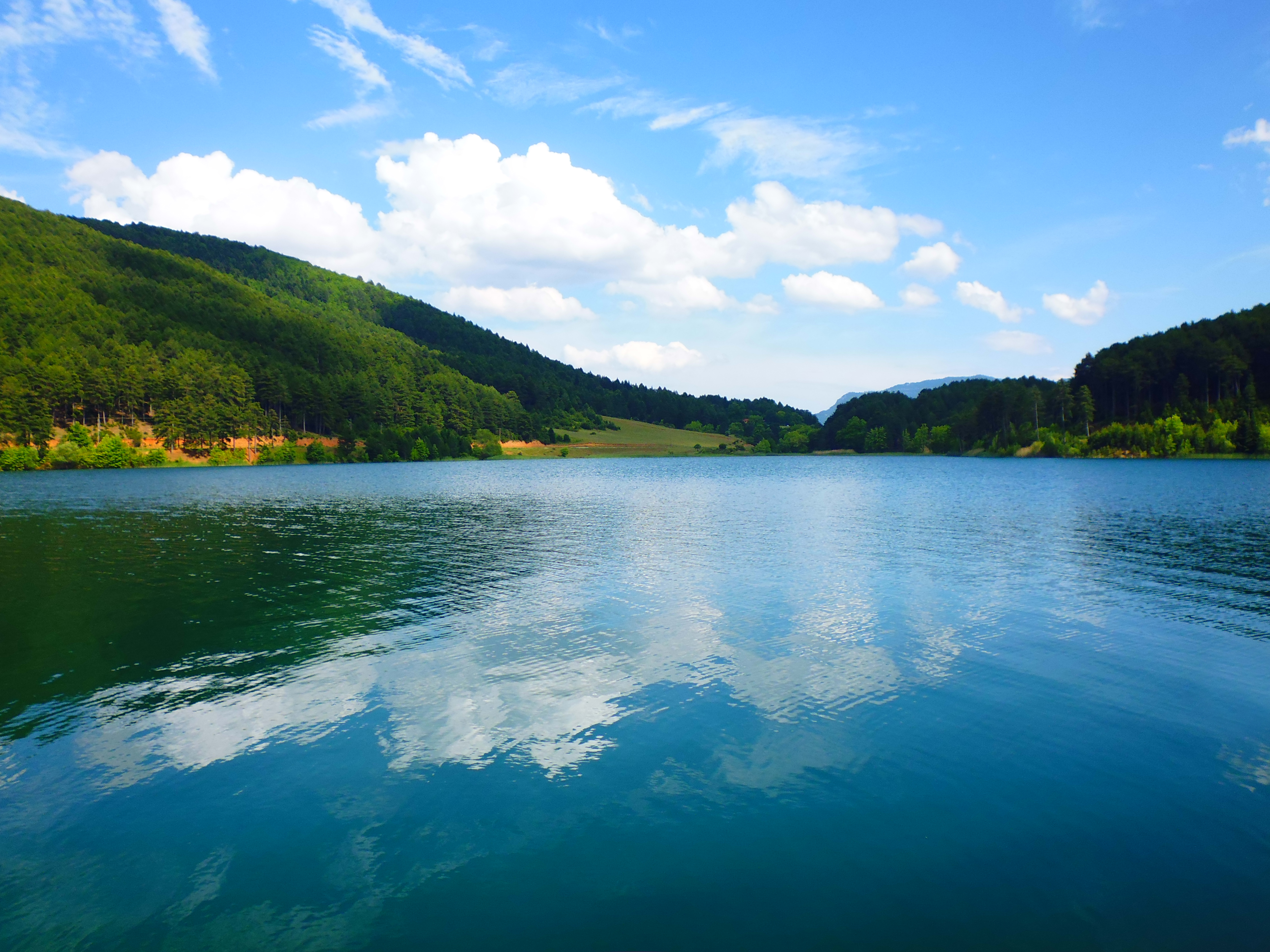
Lake Doxa
