= USCGC Thetis =

USCGC Thetis may refer to more than one ship of the United States Coast Guard:

- USCGC Thetis (WPC-115), a Thetis-class patrol boat in commission from 1931 to 1947
- USCGC Thetis (WMEC-910), a Famous-class medium endurance cutter commissioned in 1989

== See also ==
- USS Thetis, United States Navy ships of the name
