= USS Thetis =

USS Thetis has been the name of more than one United States Navy ship, and may refer to:

- USS Thetis (1881), a steamer in commission in 1884 and from 1887 to 1897
- USS Thetis (SP-391), a patrol vessel in commission from 1917 to 1919
- USCGC Thetis (WPC-115), a United States Coast Guard patrol craft in commission from 1931 to 1947 that was commissioned in the US Navy from 1941 to 1945 as USS Thetis

== See also ==
- USS Thetis Bay (CVE-90)
- USCGC Thetis, United States Coast Guard ships of the name
