= Thetis-class gunboat =

Class of Hellenic Navy corvettes

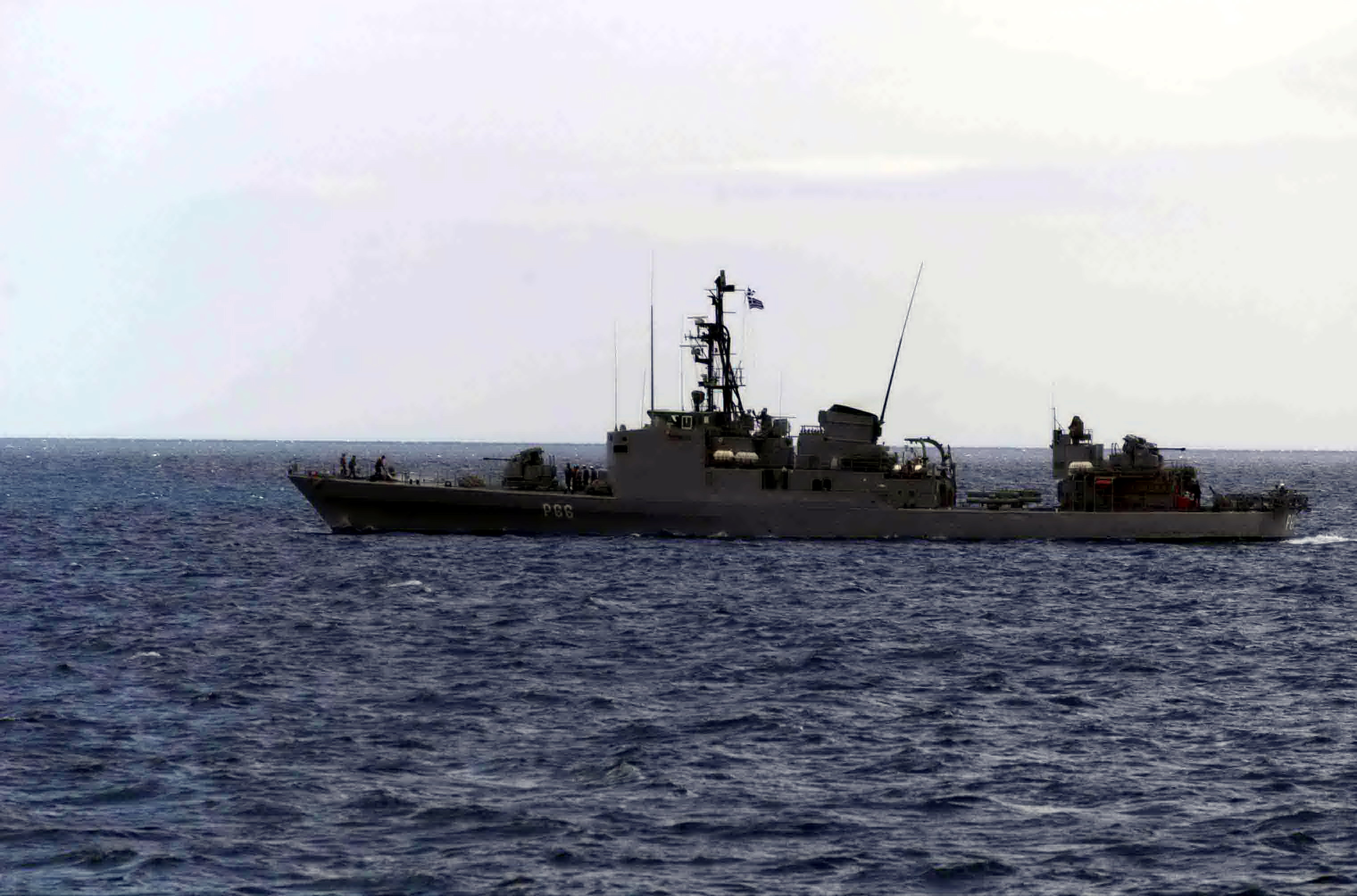
- HS Agon

Class overview
- Operators: German Navy; Hellenic Navy
- Completed: 5
- Retired: 5

General characteristics
- Type: Gunboat/Subchaser
- Displacement: 584.2/743.7 tonnes
- Length: 70 m (229 ft 8 in)
- Beam: 8.2 m (26 ft 11 in)
- Draught: 2.7 m (8 ft 10 in)
- Propulsion: 2 MAN V84V diesels; 6,800 hp(m) (5 MW); 2 shafts
- Speed: 19.5 knots (36.1 km/h) maximum
- Range: 2,760 nmi (5,110 km) at 15 knots (28 km/h)
- Complement: 57-62
- Sensors & processing systems: Search radar: Thomson-CSF TRS 3001; E/F-band.; Navigation radar: Kelvin Hughes 14/9; I-band.; Sonar: Atlas Elektronik ELAC 1 BV (hull-mounted).
- Electronic warfare & decoys: Thomson-CSF DR 2000S ESM
- Armament: Guns: Two twin Bofors L70/Breda 40 mm/70); Two Rheinmetal 20 mm.; Torpedoes: Six 324-mm Mk 32 (2 triple) tubes; 4 Honeywell Mk 46 Mod 5; Missiles: Three portable FIM-92 Stinger launchers.; Depth charges: 2 rails; Weapons control: Signaal Mk 9 TFCS

The Thetis-class gunboats was a class of five naval ships of the Hellenic Navy, originally developed for the German Navy as Class 420 and first commissioned in 1961.

== Design ==
Similar in size to corvettes, all five Class 420/Thetis-class vessels were built by Rolandwerft, Bremen. Although they were designed, built, and designated as Subchasers by the German Navy, subchasers became obsolete after the Second World War due to being unable to keep pace with advancements in submarine technology. Because the ships were designed to chase more modern submarines, they are more commonly referred to as gunboats.

The main armament of Thetis-class ships consisted of 20 mm and 40 mm guns, Mk 46 Mod5 torpedoes and mines and anti-submarine (A/S) mortars. The ships were also equipped with sonar. Later the A/S mortars were replaced by a second 40 mm gun and the single torpedo tubes by triple mountings. Upgrades started in 2000 may have included enclosed 40 mm gun mountings and Rheinmetall 20 mm guns to replace the MGs. The last two ships of the class were decommissioned on 22 April 2010.

== Ships in class ==
- Niki, P62 ("Victory", ex-Thetis, P 6052): commissioned in the German Navy on 1 July 1961, recommissioned in the Hellenic Navy on 6 September 1991, decommissioned on 2 April 2009.
- Doxa, P63 ("Glory", ex-Najade, P 6054): commissioned in the German Navy on 12 May 1962, recommissioned in the Hellenic Navy on 6 September 1991, decommissioned on 22 April 2010.
- Eleftheria, P64 ("Liberty", ex-Triton, P 6055): commissioned in the German Navy on 10 November 1962, recommissioned in the Hellenic Navy on 7 September 1992, decommissioned on 22 April 2010.
- Karteria, P65 ("Perseverance", ex-Hermes, P-6053): Commissioned in the German Navy in 1962, recommissioned in the Hellenic Navy on 7 September 1992, decommissioned in 2004.
- Agon, P66 ("Struggle", ex-Theseus, P 6056): commissioned in the German Navy in 1962, recommissioned for Hellenic Navy in the 8 November 1993, decommissioned in 2004, used as target and sunk with two Penguin missiles on 21 October 2008.
