= List of shipwrecks in April 1822 =

The list of shipwrecks in April 1822 includes some ships sunk, foundered, grounded, or otherwise lost during April 1822.

== 1 April ==
List of shipwrecks: 1 April 1822
Ship	State	Description
Ann	United Kingdom	The ship was lost on the East Florida Key. She was on a voyage from Havana, Cuba to Buenos Aires, Argentina.

== 2 April ==
List of shipwrecks: 2 April 1822
Ship	State	Description
Georgine	Hamburg	The ship was driven ashore at Krautsand, Duchy of Bremen. She was on a voyage from Hamburg to Trieste.
Jemima	United Kingdom	The ship was wrecked at Crooked Island, Bahamas.

== 3 April ==
List of shipwrecks: 3 April 1822
Ship	State	Description
Edward	United Kingdom	The ship was lost on the Gore Sand, in Bridgwater Bay. Her crew were rescued. She was on a voyage from Newport, Monmouthshire to Bridgwater, Somerset.
Favourite	United Kingdom	The ship was lost on the Gore Sand. Her crew were rescued. She was on a voyage from Newport to Bridgwater.

== 4 April ==
List of shipwrecks: 4 April 1822
Ship	State	Description
Grace	United Kingdom	The schooner was abandoned in the Atlantic Ocean. Her six crew were rescued by Westbury (United Kingdom). She was on a voyage from Norfolk, Virginia, United States to Belfast, County Antrim.
Swan	United States	The ship was driven ashore and wrecked on Texel, North Holland, Netherlands.

== 7 April ==
List of shipwrecks: 7 April 1822
Ship	State	Description
Elizabeth	Netherlands	The ship was last sighted in the Indian Ocean on this date. She was on a voyage from Batavia, Netherlands East Indies to Amsterdam, North Holland.
Favourite	United Kingdom	The ship was driven ashore at Edgartown, Massachusetts, United States. She was on a voyage from British Honduras to Boston, Massachusetts.

== 8 April ==
List of shipwrecks: 8 April 1822
Ship	State	Description
Elizabeth	United Kingdom	The ship ran aground on the Holm Sand, in the North Sea and was damaged. She was on a voyage from Caernarfon to King's Lynn, Norfolk. Elizabeth was later refloated and taken in to Harwich, Essex.
Sally	United Kingdom	The ship departed from Terceira, Spain. No further trace, presumed foundered with the loss of all hands.

== 9 April ==
List of shipwrecks: 9 April 1822
Ship	State	Description
Betsey	United Kingdom	The sloop was driven ashore and wrecked at Newcastle upon Tyne, Northumberland. Her crew were rescued. She was on a voyage from Anstruther, Fife to Newcastle upon Tyne.
Citizen	United States	The ship was wrecked on the Brigantine Shoal, off the coast of New Jersey. Her crew were rescued. She was on a voyage from Manila, Spanish East Indies to New York.
Constitution	United Kingdom	The ship ran aground in the River Mersey and was severely damaged. She was on a voyage from Liverpool, Lancashire to Virginia, United States. Constitution was later refloated and taken in to Liverpool, where she was found to be hogged.

== 10 April ==
List of shipwrecks: 10 April 1822
Ship	State	Description
Bergetha	Norway	The ship was wrecked at Kirkcaldy, Fife, United Kingdom. She was on a voyage from "Dram" to Kirkcaldy.
Kitty	United Kingdom	The ship foundered in Bideford Bay with the loss of all but one of her crew. She was on a voyage from Neath, Glamorgan to Bideford, Devon.

== 11 April ==
List of shipwrecks: 11 April 1822
Ship	State	Description
Aurora	United Kingdom	The ship ran aground on the North Bank, in Liverpool Bay. She was on a voyage from Pará, Brazil to Liverpool, Lancashire. Aurora was refloated on 18 April and taken in to Liverpool.
Lark	United Kingdom	The schooner foundered in the Atlantic Ocean with the loss of all but one of those on board. The survivor was rescued by Susan Jane (United Kingdom). She was on a voyage from Jamaica to Belfast, County Antrim.
Maria	Stettin	The ship sprang a leak in the English Channel and was beached between Christchurch, Dorset and Lymington, Hampshire, United Kingdom, where she was wrecked. Maria was on a voyage from Liverpool, Lancashire, United Kingdom to Stettin.
Phœbe Ann	United States	The ship was wrecked on the coast of Belize. She was on a voyage from New Orleans, Louisiana to New York.

== 12 April ==
List of shipwrecks: 12 April 1822
Ship	State	Description
Hoffnung	Netherlands	The ship was driven ashore and wrecked at Brielle, South Holland.
Mary Ann	United Kingdom	The ship departed from Greenock, Renfrewshire for an Irish port. No further trace, presumed foundered with the loss of all hands.
Providence	United Kingdom	The ship was driven ashore in Filey Bay.
Sophia Magdalena	Sweden	The ship was wrecked on the Haisborough Sands, in the North Sea off the coast of Norfolk, United Kingdom. She was on a voyage from Stockholm to London, United Kingdom.
Supply	United Kingdom	The ship was driven ashore and damaged near Exmouth, Devon. She was on a voyage from Gothenburg, Sweden to Topsham, Devon. Supply was refloated on 16 April.

== 15 April ==
List of shipwrecks: 15 April 1822
Ship	State	Description
Bee	United Kingdom	The ship was driven ashore in the River Thames. She was on a voyage from London to Leith, Lothian. Bee was later refloated.

== 16 April ==
List of shipwrecks: 16 April 1822
Ship	State	Description
Charlotte	United Kingdom	The ship was driven ashore near Howth, County Dublin. She was on a voyage from Galway to Belfast, County Antrim.

== 18 April ==
List of shipwrecks: 18 April 1822
Ship	State	Description
London Packet	United Kingdom	The brig foundered in the Irish Sea off the Smalls Lighthouse. She was on a voyage from Bristol, Gloucestershire to Tortola.

== 19 April ==
List of shipwrecks: 19 April 1822
Ship	State	Description
Lord Collingwood	United Kingdom	The ship was driven ashore on Dragør, Denmark. She was on a voyage from Memel, Prussia to Hull, Yorkshire. Lord Collingwood was later refloated.

== 20 April ==
List of shipwrecks: 20 April 1822
Ship	State	Description
Amphitrite	Norway	The ship collided with Harrison & Tomb (United Kingdom) and foundered with the loss of three of her crew. Survivors were rescued by Harrison & Tomb.

== 21 April ==
List of shipwrecks: 21 April 1822
Ship	State	Description
Concord	United Kingdom	The ship was wrecked in the Irish Sea near the Tuskar Rock. She was on a voyage from Liverpool, Lancashire to Newfoundland.
HMS Confiance	Royal Navy	The 18-gun Cruizer-class brig-sloop was wrecked on Mizen Head, County Cork with the loss of all 120 crew.
Daphne	United Kingdom	The ship sank at Alexandria, Egypt. She was later refloated.
Esther	United Kingdom	The barque was wrecked off the Hook Lighthouse, County Wexford with the loss of seven lives. She was on a voyage from Charleston, South Carolina, United States to Liverpool.
Fly	United Kingdom	The ship was wrecked near Ballymacotter, County Cork with the loss of all hands. She was on a voyage from São Miguel Island, Azores, Portugal to Bristol, Gloucestershire.
Isabella	United Kingdom	The ship was driven ashore and wrecked at Carron Point, County Wexford with the loss of five of the seven people on board. She was on a voyage from Cork to Glasgow, Renfrewshire.
Nimble	United Kingdom	The ship was wrecked on rocks at Robert's Cove, County Cork with some loss of life. She was on a voyage from Southampton, Hampshire to Cork.
Sandwich	United Kingdom	The ship was lost off the Hook Lighthouse with the loss of all hands. She was on a voyage from Milford Haven, Pembrokeshire to Waterford.
Three Brothers	Norway	The ship was driven ashore near Tralee, County Kerry, United Kingdom.
Unity	United Kingdom	The ship was wrecked at Castletown, County Cork with the loss of all hands.

== 22 April ==
List of shipwrecks: 22 April 1822
Ship	State	Description
Albion	United States	The ship was wrecked at Old Head of Kinsale, County Cork with the loss of 46 of the 54 people on board. She was on a voyage from New York to Liverpool, Lancashire, United Kingdom.
Asia	United States	The ship was driven ashore in Tramore Bay. She was on a voyage from Boston, Massachusetts to Liverpool.
Britannia	United Kingdom	The ship ran aground and was severely damaged off Blennerville, County Kerry. She was on a voyage from Tralee, County Kerry to Liverpool. Britannia was later refloated and taken in to Blennerville.
Mohawk	United States	The ship was wrecked near Tralee, County Kerry, United Kingdom. Her crew were rescued. She was on a voyage from New York to Newry, County Antrim, United Kingdom.
Robert and Edward	United Kingdom	The ship was wrecked at Castlehaven, County Cork with the loss of all hands.

== 23 April ==
List of shipwrecks: 23 April 1822
Ship	State	Description
Highland Chieftain	United Kingdom	The paddle steamer was driven ashore at "Clayhole" and severely damaged She was on a voyage from Glasgow, Renfrewshire to Stranraer, Wigtownshire. Highland Chieftain was later repaired and returned to service.
Rover	United Kingdom	The ship was lost at Cape Race, Newfoundland, British North America. Her crew were rescued.

== 24 April ==
List of shipwrecks: 24 April 1822
Ship	State	Description
Atlantic	United Kingdom	The ship ran aground on the North Bull, in the Irish Sea off the coast of County Dublin. She was on a voyage from Dublin to New York, United States.
James	United Kingdom	The ship was driven ashore and wrecked at Holyhead, Anglesey. She was on a voyage from Liverpool, Lancashire to Limerick.

== 25 April ==
List of shipwrecks: 25 April 1822
Ship	State	Description
Charlotte Ann	United States	The ship was abandoned at sea. She was on a voyage from Eastport, Maine to Barbados.
Hermes	United Kingdom	The whaler was lost in the South Seas. Her crew were rescued. Another account says she was wrecked on a coral reef in the NW of the Hawaiian Islands which is supported by the fact two of the crewmen formed the James Robinson & Co boat repair company in Honolulu.
Pearl	United Kingdom	The whaler was lost in the South Sea. Her crew were rescued.

== 26 April ==
List of shipwrecks: 26 April 1822
Ship	State	Description
Harriet	(United Kingdom of Great Britain and Ireland) British North America	The ship was wrecked on the Mira Porvas Keys. Her crew survived. She was on a voyage from Halifax, Nova Scotia to Jamaica.
Hermes	United Kingdom	The whaler was lost in the South Seas.
Pearl	United Kingdom	The whaler was lost in the South Seas.

== 28 April ==
List of shipwrecks: 28 April 1822
Ship	State	Description
Harriet	(United Kingdom of Great Britain and Ireland) British North America	The ship was wrecked on the Mira Porvas Keys. Her crew were rescued on 4 May by Charles ( (United Kingdom of Great Britain and Ireland) Saint Thomas). Harriet was on a voyage from Jamaica to Halifax, Nova Scotia.
Regina	Rostock	The ship struck a rock off Bergen auf Rügen, Prussia and foundered. She was on a voyage from Rostock to Saint Petersburg, Russia.

== 30 April ==
List of shipwrecks: 30 April 1822
Ship	State	Description
John and Charlotte	United Kingdom	The ship was sunk by ice off the Magdalen Islands, Quebec City, Lower Canada, British North America. Her crew were rescued. She was on a voyage from Portsmouth, Hampshire to Miramichi Bay.

== Unknown date ==
List of shipwrecks: Unknown date in April 1822
Ship	State	Description
Adelaide	United Kingdom	The ship foundered in the North Sea off Hanstholm, Denmark with the loss of three of her crew.
Ann	United Kingdom	The ship was lost on the East Florida Keys in late April. She was on a voyage from Havana, Cuba to Buenos Aires, Argentina.
Argo	United Kingdom	The ship was wrecked near Castletown, Isle of Man.
Barbara	United Kingdom	The ship foundered in the North Sea off Sumburgh Head, Shetland Islands with the loss of all four crew. She was on a voyage from Peterhead, Aberdeenshire to Lerwick, Shetland Islands.
Elizabeth and Mary	United Kingdom	The ship was wrecked on Chios, Greece.
Findon	United Kingdom	The ship was run down and sunk in the North Sea off Flamborough Head by Blossom (United Kingdom) Her crew were rescued. She was on a voyage from Sunderland, County Durham to Maldon, Essex.
Haabet	Norway	The ship was lost on the Gunfleet Sand, in the North Sea off the coast of Essex, United Kingdom. Her crew survived.
Jemima	United Kingdom	The brig was driven ashore on "Castel Island". Her crew were rescued.
Linen Hall	United Kingdom	The schooner foundered off Wicklow.
Lovely Emily	United Kingdom	The ship foundered with the loss of all hands. She was on a voyage from Swansea, Glamorgan to Hayle, Cornwall.
Margaretha Laurentia	Netherlands	The ship was lost near Brest, Finistère, France. She was on a voyage from Dordrecht, North Holland to Brest.
Palladium	United Kingdom	The ship was lost near "Robsnout", Jutland. She was on a voyage from Aberdeen to Riga, Russia.
Spectator	United Kingdom	The ship sprang a leak and foundered in the Atlantic Ocean off Long Island, New York, United States. All on board were rescued. She was on a voyage from New York City to Saint John, New Brunswick, British North America
Ulrica	Spain	The ship was lost off "Rodehuus" with the loss of a crew member.
