= Pearl and Hermes Atoll =

Atoll of Hawaii

Native name: Holoikauaua
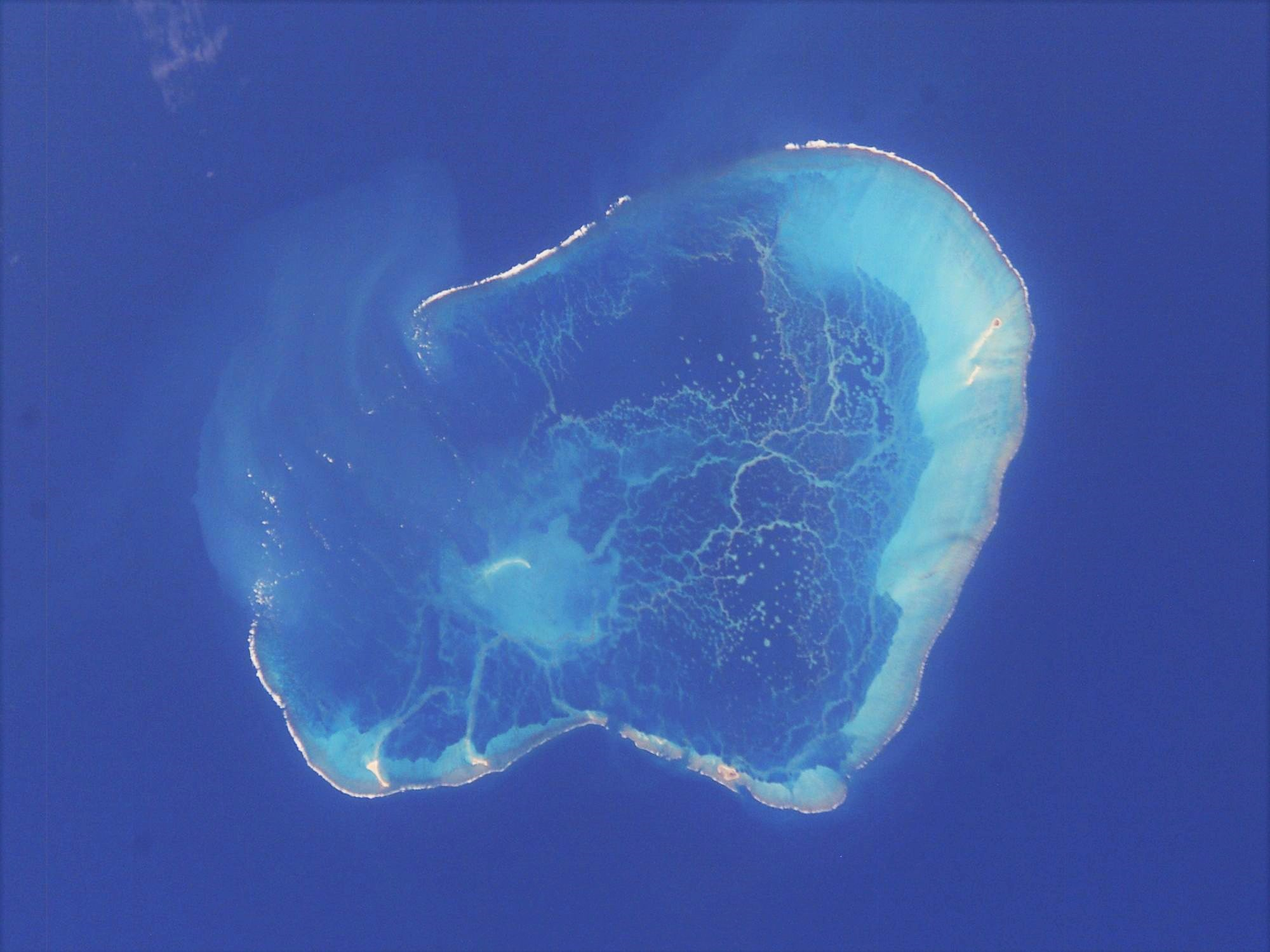
- NASA picture of the Pearl and Hermes Atoll

- Pearl and Hermes (Pacific Ocean) Location of Pearl and Hermes Atoll in the Pacific Ocean

Geography
- Location: Pacific Ocean
- Coordinates: 27.8611°N 175.8529°W
- Archipelago: Northwestern Hawaiian Islands

Administration
- United States
- State: Hawaii
- County: Honolulu

Demographics
- Population: 0

Additional information
- Time zone: UTC−10

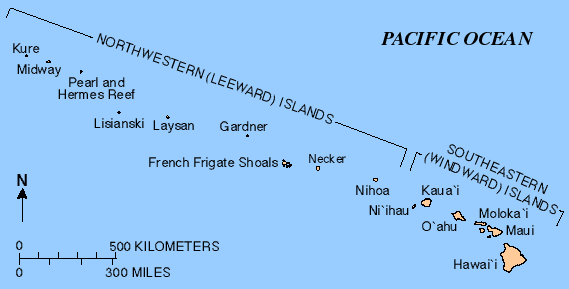
Map showing the location of Pearl and Hermes Atoll in the Hawaiian island chain

The Pearl and Hermes Atoll (Hawaiian: Holoikauaua), also known as Pearl and Hermes Reef, is part of the Northwestern Hawaiian Islands, a group of small islands and atolls that form the farthest northwest portion of the Hawaiian island chain. The atoll consists of a variable number of flat and sandy islets, typically between five and seven. More were noted in historical sources but have since been lost to erosion and rising sea levels.

The atoll is named after Pearl and Hermes, a pair of English whaleships that wrecked there in 1822. It has been the site of at least eight known shipwrecks, including the Japanese Wiji Maru, SS Quartette, and most recently MV Casitas, which ran aground on the reef in 2005.

The atoll is an important habitat for seabirds, marine life, and invertebrate species. Twenty-two bird species nest and breed on the islands, including twenty percent of the world's population of black-footed albatrosses. The atoll has historically been included with the rest of the Northwestern Hawaiian Islands in conservation efforts. It is included in the Papahānaumokuākea Marine National Monument, created in 2006. Ghost nets and other fishing debris, rising sea levels, and the invasive algae Chondria tumulosa pose a significant risk to the atoll and its wildlife.

== Geography ==
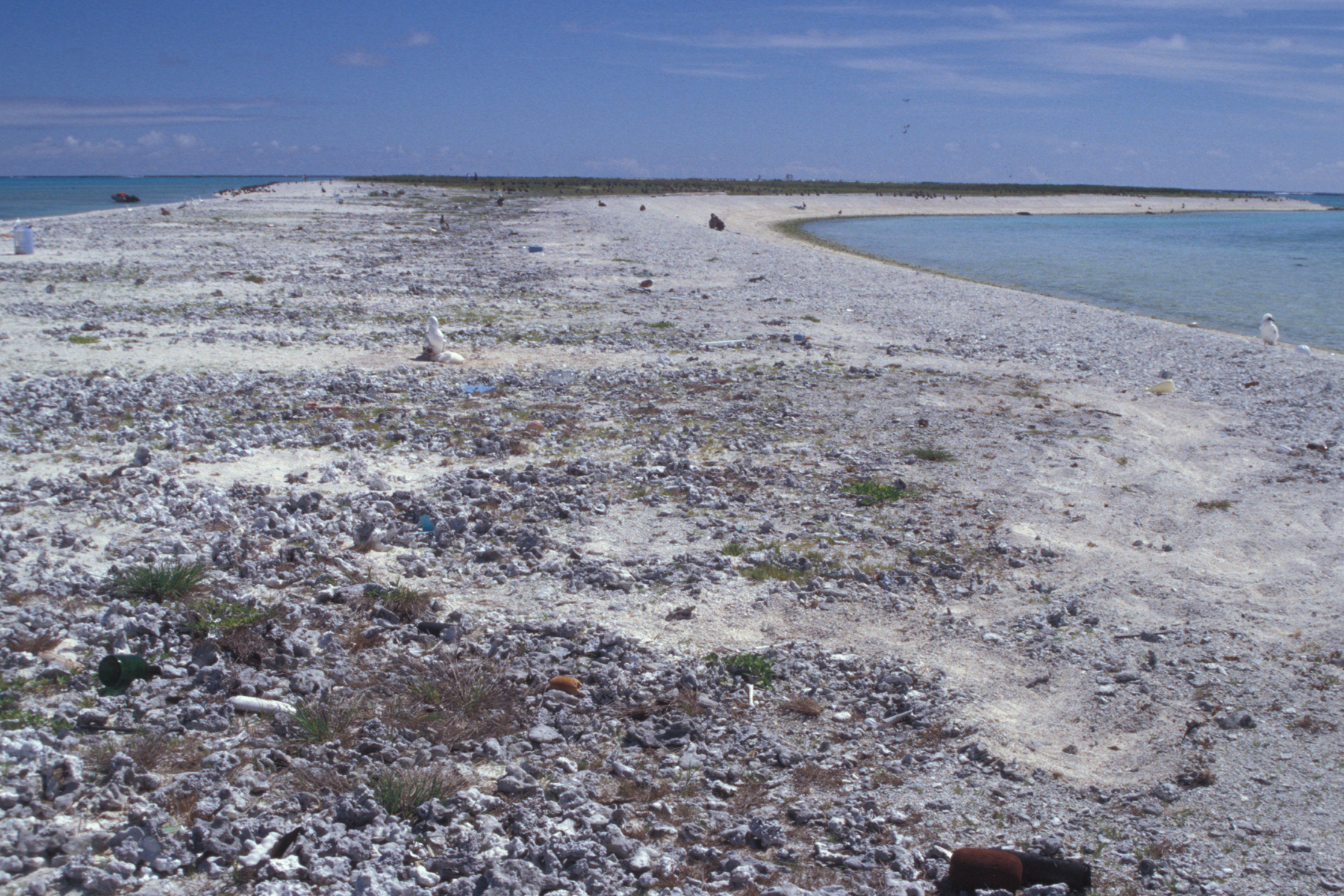
North Island of Pearl and Hermes Atoll in 1999

The Pearl and Hermes Atoll is the third northernmost atoll of Hawaii, behind Midway and Kure, approximately 1,299 mi (2,090 km) northwest of Honolulu and 87 mi (140 km) east-southeast of Midway Atoll. Like the rest of the Hawaiian Islands, the atoll observes Hawaii Standard Time. In total, Pearl and Hermes has about 32 ha (80 acres) of land and almost 80,937 ha (200,000 acres) of coral reef habitat. The fringing coral reef which surrounds the atoll is roughly 43 mi (69 km) in circumference and open to the west.

The atoll's land area consists of several small islands which are periodically washed over when winter storms pass, along with several ephemeral sand spits. The islets are low and flat, with an average elevation of no more than 1.2 metres (3.9 ft) in 2012, and there are no sources of fresh water on any of them. As of 2012, according to the United States Geological Survey (USGS), the atoll consists of five islands. Earlier sources note the presence of other islets, including a Sand Island and a Bird Island.

From largest to smallest, the five remaining islands are Southeast Island (18.4 ha (45 acres)), Seal-Kittery (13.7 ha (34 acres)), North Island (8.4 ha (21 acres)), Grass Island (3.2 ha (7.9 acres)), and Little North Island (3.2 ha (7.9 acres)). Only the three largest islands have vegetation.

Comma-shaped North Island is the atoll's northernmost island. Little North Island lies to the southeast, less than 1 km (0.62 mi) away. Southeast Island lies approximately 15 km (9.3 mi) to the southeast of Little North. Grass Island approximately 9 km (5.6 mi) east, and Seal Kittery just under 4 km (2.5 mi) to the east of that.

== Nomenclature ==
The atoll is named for the ships Pearl and Hermes, which were wrecked upon it in 1822.

The Hawaiian-language name for the atoll, Holoikauaua, was established in the late 1990s by the Hawaiian Lexicon Committee following an effort to restore traditional Hawaiian names which had been lost, misspelled, or replaced with foreign names. Because its original Hawaiian name was not known, the Committee conferred the new name of Holoikauaua to the atoll, in reference to the Hawaiian monk seal which frequents the waters there.

== History ==
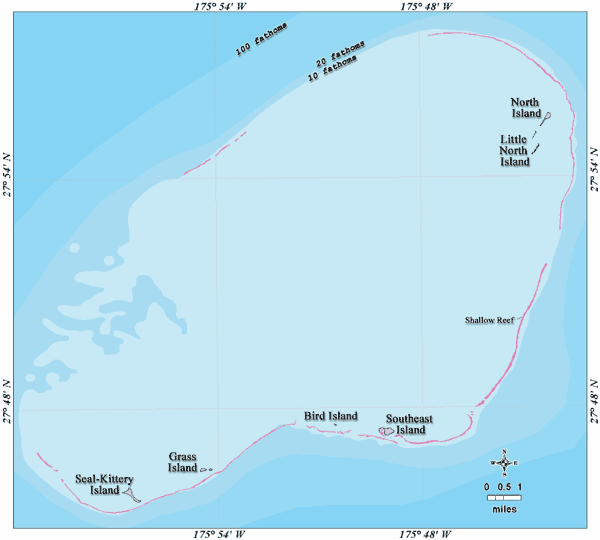
NOAA bathymetric map

=== Initial discovery by Europeans ===
The atoll was discovered in 1822 when the English whaleships Pearl and Hermes ran aground on the surrounding reefs. The two ships had been en route to Japan from Honolulu through the uncharted waters of the Northwestern Hawaiian Islands. Sometime late in the evening of April 24 or early in the morning of April 25, the 258-ton Hermes ran aground on an unseen reef. Shortly thereafter, the 327-ton Pearl also ran aground when it approached to provide assistance. The combined crews of both ships, some 57 sailors, were marooned on an unspecified island nearby for several months. During that time, James Robinson, a carpenter's mate, directed the construction of a small 30-ton vessel from the wreckage. Some accounts provide the name of the vessel as Drift, while others state it was called Deliverance.

On July 1, before the beach-built vessel could be launched, the passing ship Earl of Morby was sighted. 46 of the sailors took passage on the Earl of Morby, but Robinson and eleven others opted to purchase the vessel they had built and sail it back to Honolulu in the hopes of recovering some of the losses incurred by the wreck. The sailors managed to sail the small vessel back to the main Hawaiian islands without further loss of life. They sold it for US$2,000. Robinson remained in Honolulu, and founded the James Robinson and Company shipyard there in 1827.

King Kamehameha III of Hawaii claimed the atoll by proclamation in 1854. In 1857, it was surveyed by the crew of the Hawaiian schooner Manuokawai. The United States took possession of the atoll in 1859 by way of Captain N.C. Brooks and his ship Gambia. Brooks reported that the atoll had eleven or twelve islets, and that some of them had trees and coarse grass. In 1867, the crew of the Laconda produced the first reliable chart of the reef, which was published by the United States Navy.

Entrepreneurs from a rabbit canning business intentionally released rabbits on Southeast Island in 1894, where they devoured all the island's vegetation. This was the first documented instance of mammals being introduced to the atoll.

The Japanese schooner Wiji Maru was wrecked on the atoll in 1904, destroying the ship and its cargo of feathers. There was no loss of life, however. In 1916, crew members from the Thetis reported that they had spotted rabbits and Japanese fishing huts on Southeast Island. In 1923, the vessels of the Tanager Expedition stopped at the atoll and killed "all but one rabbit on Southeast Island."

=== Exploitation of oysters ===
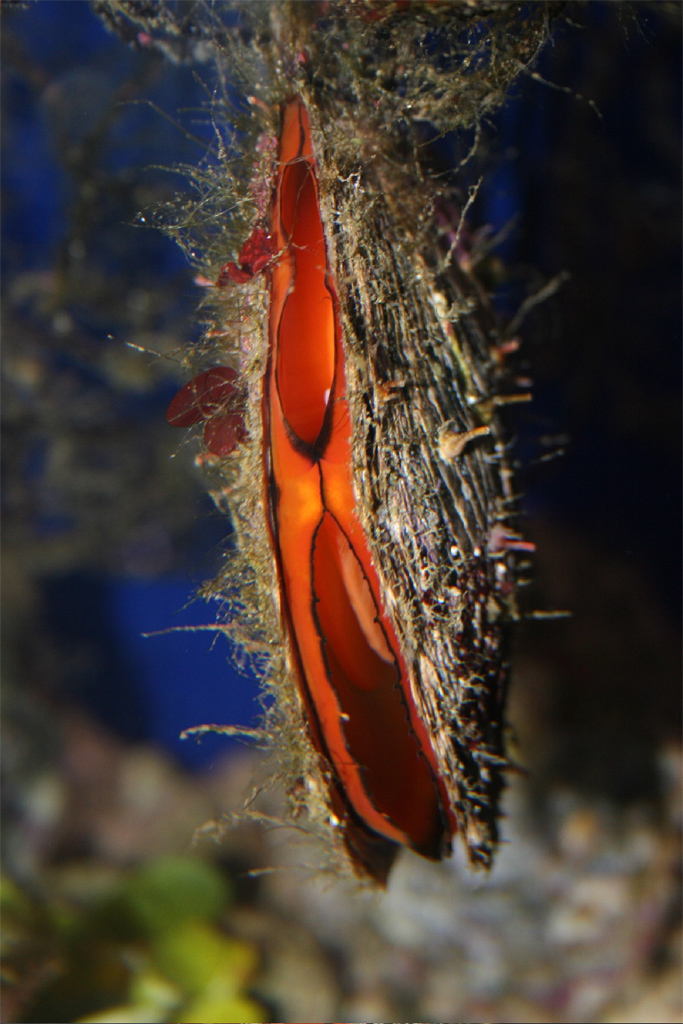
Black-lip pearl oyster at the Aquarium Finisterrae in Galicia, Spain

In 1927, Captain William Greig Anderson of the Lanikai Fishing Company was fishing for tuna and in the process, discovered beds of black-lip pearl oysters in the atoll. He reported that they were rich with pearls – the only pearl beds in the United States. Anderson formed a trading company to capitalize on his find. Over the next three years, his trading company harvested some 20,000 pearls from the atoll, with the largest of these having a reported value of US$5,000. Some 150 tons of oyster shells, valued for their shiny mother-of-pearl, were harvested in the process. They were primarily sold to button manufacturers on the United States mainland.

In 1929, oyster harvesting in the atoll was made illegal by the government of the Territory of Hawaii. In 1930, the United States Bureau of Fisheries decided to conduct a thorough study of the atoll, led by Dr. Paul Galtsoff. The United States Navy loaned the minesweeper ship Whippoorwill for the five-week expedition, which covered the reef's geography, flora, and invertebrate and fish populations. A specific emphasis was placed on the pearl oyster population. Only 470 oysters were found. 320 were collected alive, and 150 were opened for examination. An estimated 10% contained pearls. Based on those findings, the surveyors concluded that Captain Anderson must have harvested between 150,000 and 200,000 oysters to obtain his reported 20,000 pearls, which had significantly depleted the oyster beds.

The Whippoorwill expedition documented wildlife aside from the oysters: Dr. Galtsoff's report indicated that they had found seals, sharks, sea turtles, albatrosses, booby birds, and numerous species of fish. They did not find any of the trees which Captain Brooks had mentioned in his 1857 report.

=== Later wrecks ===
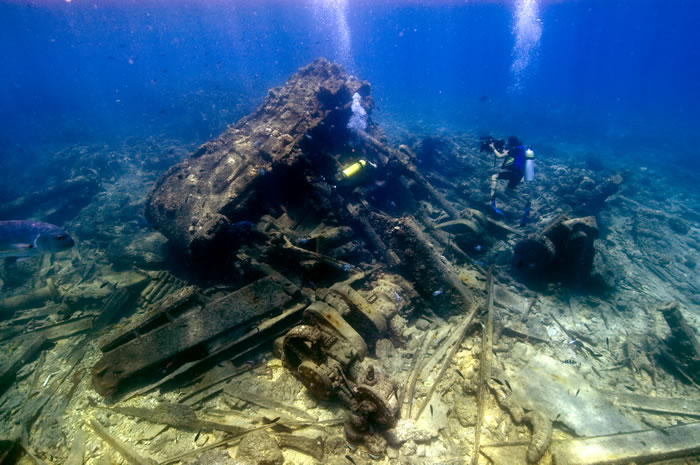
Wreckage of SS Quartette

On December 21, 1952, SS Quartette, a 422-foot-long (129 m) Liberty ship measuring 7,198 tons, struck the eastern reef of the atoll at a speed of 10.5 kn (19 km/h; 12 mph). The ship was driven further onto the reef by rough waves and 35 mph (56 km/h) winds, which collapsed the bow and damaged two forward holds. The crew was evacuated by SS Frontenac Victory the following day. The salvage tug Ono arrived on December 25 to attempt to tow the ship clear, but persistent stormy weather forced a delay of the rescue attempt. On January 3, before another rescue attempt could be made, the ship's anchors tore loose, and Quartette was blown onto the reef. It was deemed a total loss. Several weeks later, it snapped in half at the keel and the two pieces sank. The wreck site now serves as an artificial reef which provides a habitat for many fish species.

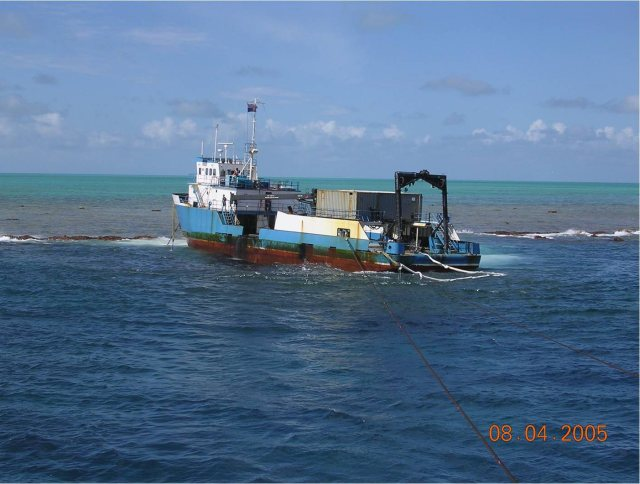
MV Casitas aground on Pearl and Hermes Atoll, August 4, 2005

On July 2, 2005, the 145 ft (44 m) research vessel MV Casitas, chartered by the National Oceanic and Atmospheric Administration (NOAA), ran aground on the north end of the atoll. The ship was carrying large quantities of gasoline, diesel fuel, and oil, which posed a substantial risk of leaking. Leak-prevention and extraction efforts led by the United States Coast Guard (USCG) in conjunction with other United States Government and State of Hawaii agencies began immediately. Although several people on board were forced to evacuate the ship, there was no loss of life. The initial grounding, combined with the rescue efforts, caused extensive damage to the reef including "breakage of coral heads, scouring of the substrate, and injury to the reef structure itself". The ship was fully removed from the atoll on August 4, 2005, but was too damaged for salvage. She was towed to a site northwest of Pearl and Hermes Atoll approved by the Environmental Protection Agency (EPA), where she was sunk in waters over 7,000 ft (2,134 m) deep. Efforts to remove remaining debris and repair the reef began in 2011.

=== Site exploration ===
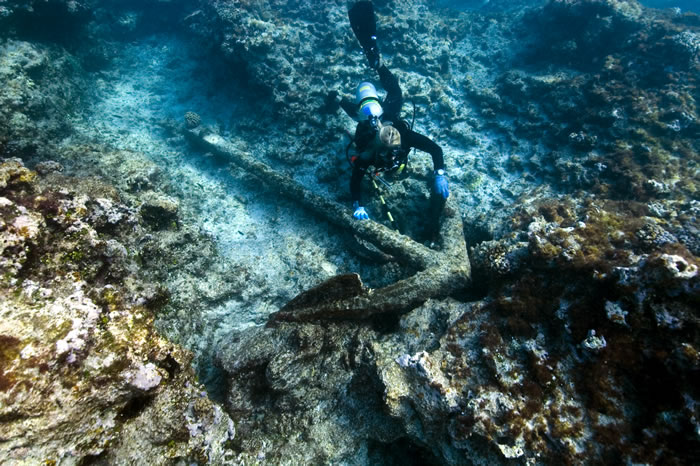
An early 19th century anchor at the Hermes shipwreck site

In 2004, divers from NOAA located wreckage believed to be from Pearl during a debris removal dive. They were not able to complete a full survey at the time due to the challenging site environment. The same dive team also located the wreck site of an unknown fishing vessel during the same trip, which they nicknamed the "Oshima" site as some of the components located were similar to the Japanese "Oshima" design. Among the components located were "a six-cylinder Atlas Imperial diesel and machinery scatter, propeller shaft and propeller, a marine propulsion plant popular in the early decades of the 20th century." Researchers theorized that the wreckage was an East Asian fishing vessel that struck the reef sometime after 1918, based on the age of the components.

Maritime archaeologists from the NOAA returned to the wreck site of Pearl in 2005 and 2006 to conduct further surveys. The 2005 survey was based on the NOAA research vessel Hiʻialakai. The same group also attempted to survey the nearby site of Hermes, but were prevented by poor weather conditions. A number of artifacts were found at the Pearl site, including anchors, two cannons, and large try pots for rendering whale blubber. Many smaller artifacts were found actually embedded into the coral of the reef. The 2006 survey focused on completing a full site plan of the wreckage. In contrast to the scattered state of the Hermes site, the artifacts of the Pearl site are grouped roughly in the same configuration that they would have had on the intact ship, with site length being approximately the length the ship would have been.

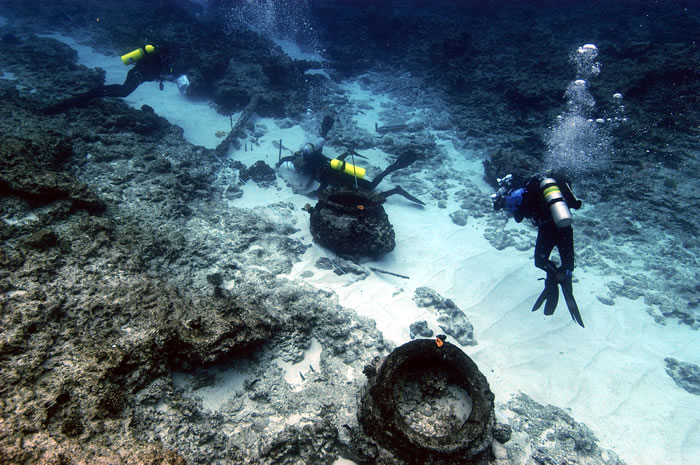
Divers inspecting artifacts at the Pearl site

In 2008, NOAA maritime archaeologists returned to the site of Hermes to complete the survey begun in 2005. The site was confirmed to be located about 1,300 ft (400 m) to the west of the Pearl site. A full site plan was completed, and both photographs and high definition video were made. The site contained similar artifacts to those found at the site of the Pearl, including two anchors and four cannons. At least 33 cannonballs were found, stored in linear racks, as well as stores of musket balls. Finally, some 150 iron ballast pieces were found. The extremely scattered state of the wreckage seems to confirm that the Hermes broke apart quickly and scattered with force across the sea floor.

== Flora and fauna ==
=== Plant life ===
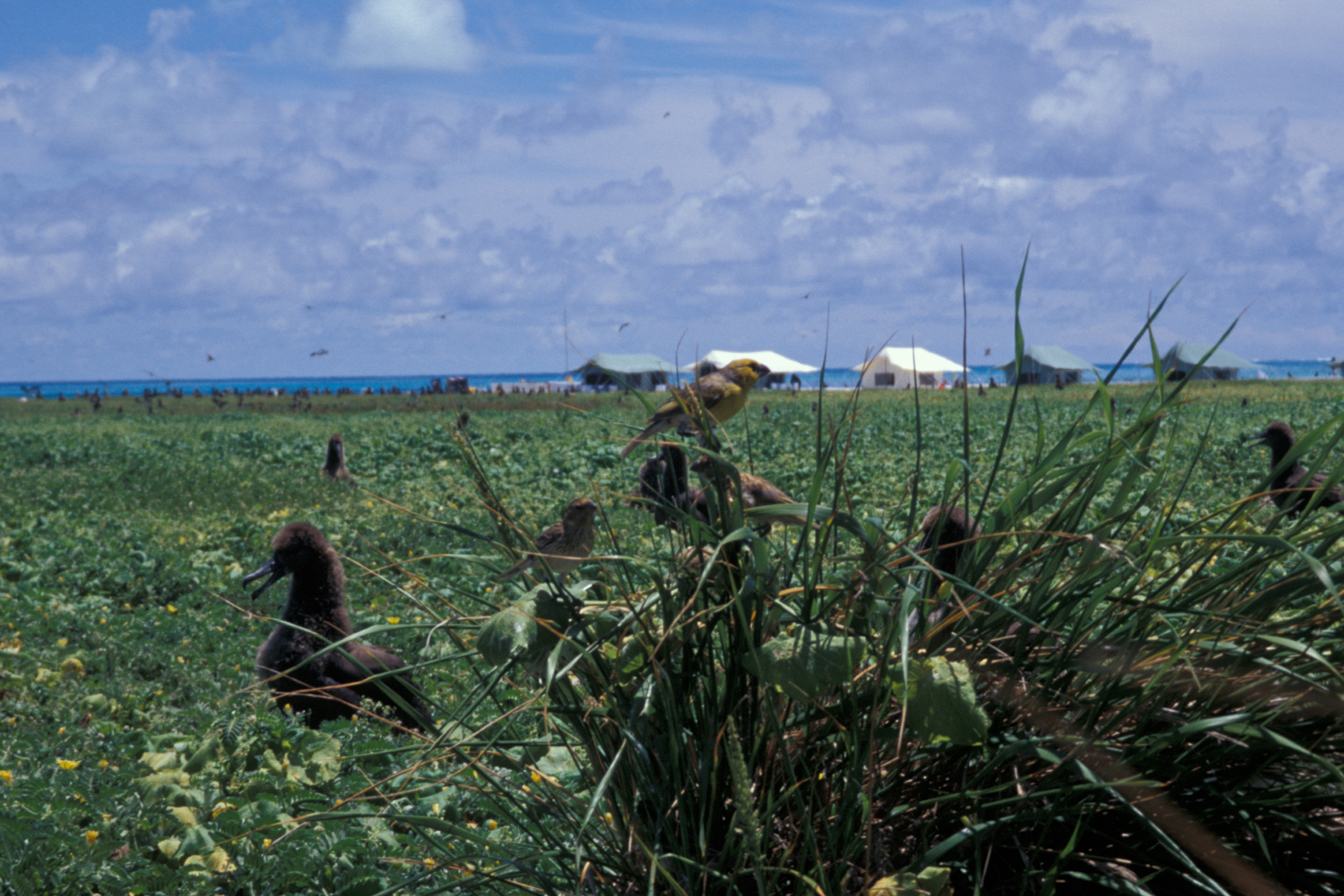
Eragrostis variabilis, a grass species native to the atoll, with Laysan finches and albatrosses

The islets of the Pearl and Hermes Atoll support thirteen native plant species and seven introduced species, including coastal grasses, vines, and herbal plants. Invasive plant species are considered a major conservation issue on the atoll, as they often out-compete and replace native species. As an example, Setaria verticillata, an undesirable noxious weed, has displaced the native grass Eragrostis variabilis on Southeast Island. An illegal landing by the military in the 1960s brought invasive field mustard seeds from Midway Atoll, which had to be removed by the U.S. Fish and Wildlife Service. The flowering plant Verbesina encelioides has been identified as a major invasive threat since at least 2001. Although it provides food and nesting space for small songbirds, it poses a significant threat of entanglement to native seabirds, so removal is considered a priority for conservation purposes.

=== Avian life ===
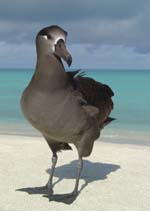
Twenty percent of the world population of black-footed albatrosses breed on Pearl and Hermes

The Pearl and Hermes Atoll is an important nesting area for many seabirds. Approximately 160,000 birds from 22 different species are known to live and breed on the Atoll. Tristram's storm petrels and black-footed albatrosses are among the most prominent. In 2001, it was reported that twenty percent of the world's population of black-footed albatrosses nested on Pearl and Hermes. Pearl and Hermes also hosts one of two known sites where little terns nest in Hawaii. In addition, the endangered Laysan finch was introduced to the island in 1967 to provide a backup population of these birds, should a hurricane, disease, rat introduction, or other disaster wipe out the population on the island of Laysan.

=== Invertebrates ===
The Pearl and Hermes Atoll provides an extensive and unique habitat for invertebrates, including various sponges and thirty-three species of stony corals. Some invasive invertebrate species have been found on the reef, including the orange-striped sea anemone, which is native to Japan, and the Christmas tree hydroid, which competes with native invertebrates for space.

The atoll was once heavily populated with black-lip pearl oysters, but overfishing from 1927 to 1930 caused the population to crash to only 470 in 1930. An expedition in 1950 turned up only six live oysters, and another in 1969 only found one. Surveys in 1994 and 2000 also found only a few oysters, and a full analysis by the NOAA in 2003 concluded that the population has never recovered to pre-harvesting levels.

=== Other wildlife ===
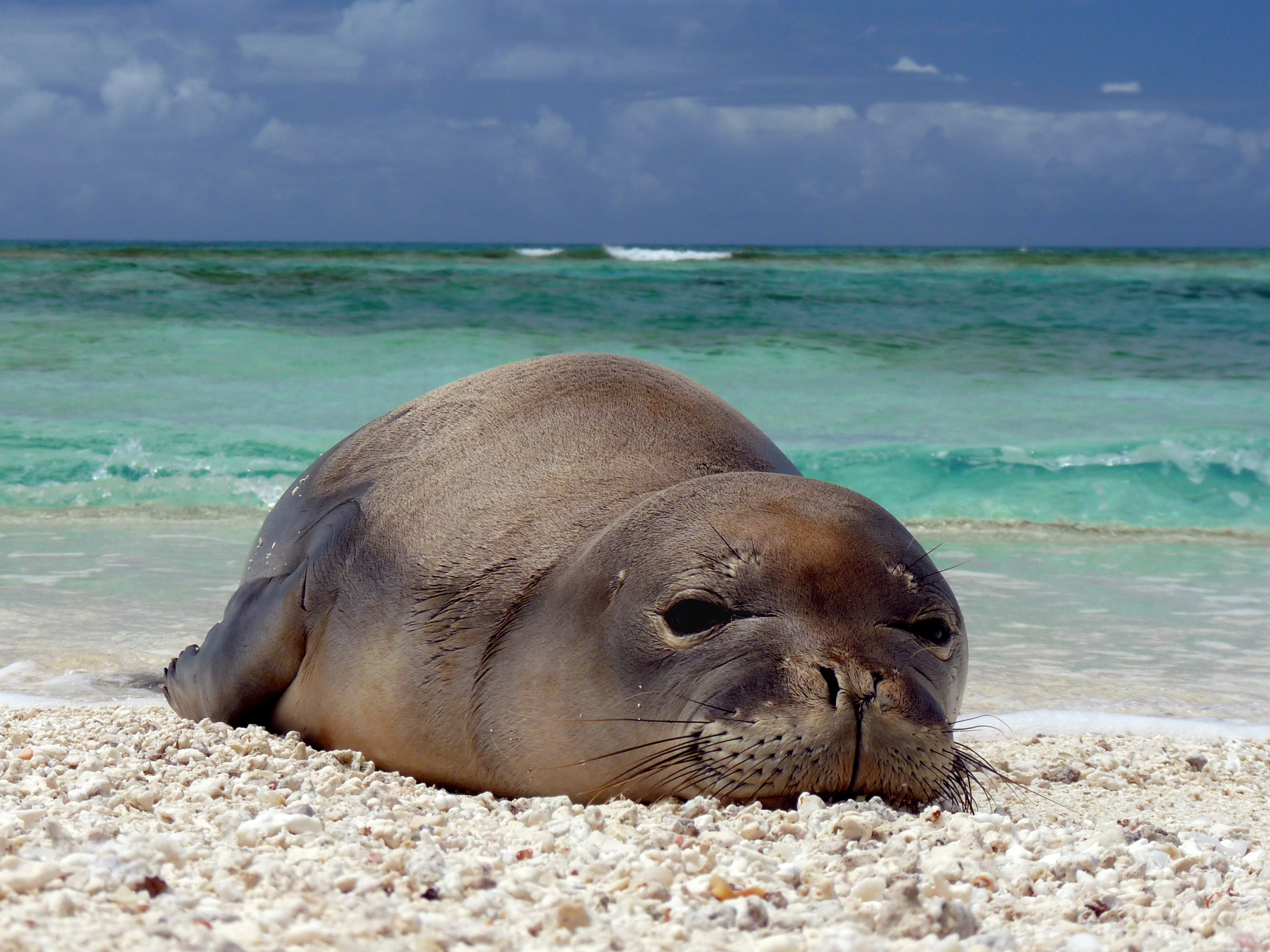
A Hawaiian monk seal

The Pearl and Hermes Atoll supports breeding populations of endangered Hawaiian monk seals and sea turtles. Spinner dolphins are known to mate in the area. According to the U.S. Fish and Wildlife Service, "the atoll has the highest standing stock of fish and the highest number of fish species in the NWHI", including sabre squirrelfish, various eels, Galapagos sharks, Sandbar sharks, giant trevally or ulua, angelfish, āweoweo or Hawaiian bigeyes, parrotfish, and various types of lobsters. Although they are rare in the rest of the Hawaiian Islands, masked angelfish and Japanese angelfish are common in the Pearl and Hermes Atoll.

In 2016, scientists from the Bishop Museum, working with the NOAA, described a new species of butterflyfish found off the Pearl and Hermes Atoll, at a depth of 180 ft (55 m). It was named Prognathodes basabei in honor of diver Pete Basabe, who provided support to the dives that first discovered the species.

== Conservation efforts ==
Because of its small size, Pearl and Hermes Atoll has typically not been singled out for individual environmental protection; historically, it has been bundled with the Northwestern Hawaiian Islands as a protected region. The region was first protected in 1909 when U.S. President Theodore Roosevelt created the Hawaiian Islands Bird Reservation through Executive Order 1019, which included Pearl and Hermes Atoll. Over the next century, protection of the region increased incrementally, culminating in President George W. Bush signing Proclamation 8031 in 2006, designating the waters of the Northwestern Hawaiian Islands a national monument under the 1906 Antiquities Act.

=== Threats ===
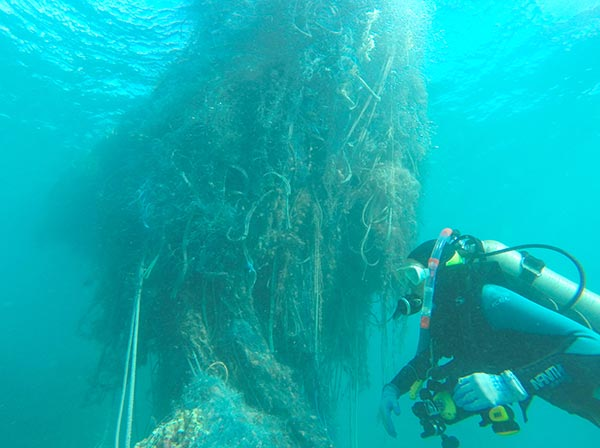
This monster net found at Pearl and Hermes in 2014 weighed 11.5 tons

Derelict fishing gear (ghost nets) and other types of marine debris have had a major impact on the reefs and associated fauna of the atoll. Pearl and Hermes Atoll is considered a high-risk entanglement zone for monk seals. Efforts have been undertaken to lessen the threat of this growing problem, including attempts at prevention as well as recurring debris removal projects. A multi-agency study was launched in 1999 to remove and catalogue debris from the water surrounding Lisianski Island and Pearl and Hermes Atoll. During this project, a total of 9.6 short tons (8,676 kg) of debris was removed from reefs and beaches around Pearl and Hermes. In 2000, the joint NOAA and NMFS Derelict Fishing Net Removal Project was launched, with the objective of removing fishing debris from the atoll and identifying any non-native species. In 2003, 90 short tons (82,000 kg) of marine debris was removed from the Pearl and Hermes reefs. In 2014, a net tangle weighing 11.5 short tons (10,400 kg) was located in the atoll. It was 28 ft (8.5 m) long, 7 ft (2.1 m) wide, and 16 ft (4.9 m) deep, and took three days to dismantle and remove.

Rising sea level is also a major concern for the atoll due to the extremely low elevation of most of the islands. The U.S. Environmental Protection Agency projects that sea level will rise 13–16 inches (33–41 cm) by the year 2100. Southeast Island is only 3 feet (1 m) above sea level, and would be almost entirely submerged if sea levels rise that much. The other islets would also lose significant amounts of land area. Estimates of total land area loss range from 15% to 65% in a scenario of median sea-level rise, threatening the habitats of monk seals, sea turtles, and nesting birds.

In 2016, a mysterious new red algae species known as Chondria tumulosa was spotted growing on the reefs. By 2019, it had smothered and killed large amounts of reef on the northeast section of the atoll. Analysis of the species and management techniques will be required to prevent the species from taking over other reefs on the atoll and the rest of the Northwest Hawaiian Islands.

== Climate ==
Because there are no weather stations on the Pearl and Hermes Atoll, the following climate information is taken from sources for the Midway Atoll, which is approximately 87 mi (140 km) north-northwest of Pearl and Hermes. Like Midway, Pearl and Hermes has a tropical savanna climate (Köppen classification Aw). The atoll has no cold season. Its wet season corresponds to the high-sun months, and its dry season corresponds to the low-sun months.

Climate data for Pearl and Hermes Atoll
Month	Jan	Feb	Mar	Apr	May	Jun	Jul	Aug	Sep	Oct	Nov	Dec	Year
Record high °F (°C)	80 (27)	81 (27)	81 (27)	82 (28)	87 (31)	89 (32)	92 (33)	92 (33)	92 (33)	89 (32)	88 (31)	82 (28)	92 (33)
Mean daily maximum °F (°C)	70 (21)	70 (21)	71 (22)	72 (22)	76 (24)	81 (27)	83 (28)	84 (29)	84 (29)	80 (27)	76 (24)	73 (23)	77 (25)
Daily mean °F (°C)	66 (19)	66 (19)	67 (19)	69 (21)	72 (22)	77 (25)	79 (26)	80 (27)	80 (27)	77 (25)	73 (23)	69 (21)	73 (23)
Mean daily minimum °F (°C)	62 (17)	62 (17)	63 (17)	64 (18)	68 (20)	73 (23)	75 (24)	75 (24)	75 (24)	72 (22)	69 (21)	65 (18)	69 (20)
Record low °F (°C)	49 (9)	50 (10)	51 (11)	53 (12)	55 (13)	61 (16)	63 (17)	64 (18)	64 (18)	59 (15)	55 (13)	51 (11)	49 (9)
Average precipitation inches (mm)	5.0 (130)	3.8 (97)	3.0 (76)	2.5 (64)	2.3 (58)	2.2 (56)	3.3 (84)	4.3 (110)	3.5 (89)	3.5 (89)	3.8 (97)	4.1 (100)	41.3 (1,050)
Average precipitation days	16	14	12	11	9	9	15	15	15	14	14	16	160
Source: Weatherbase

== See also ==
- Desert island
- Lists of islands
