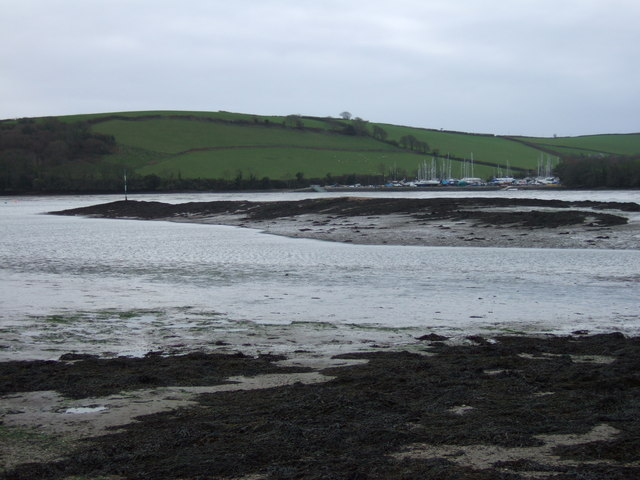
- Chondria coerulescens in Devon

Scientific classification
- Domain: Eukaryota
- Clade: Archaeplastida
- Division: Rhodophyta
- Class: Florideophyceae
- Order: Ceramiales
- Family: Rhodomelaceae
- Genus: Chondria; C.Agardh, 1817

= Chondria (alga) =

Genus of algae

Chondria is a genus of red algae in the family Rhodomelaceae.

== Species ==
- Chondria acanthophora C.Agardh
- Chondria acrorhizophora Setchell & N.L.Gardner
- Chondria angustata Kylin
- Chondria angustissima Gordon-Mills & Womersley
- Chondria arborescens (J.Agardh) De Toni
- Chondria arcuata Hollenberg
- Chondria armata var. plumaris Børgesen
- Chondria armata (Kützing) Okamura
- Chondria articulata var. linearis C.Agardh
- Chondria articulata var. gracilis C.Agardh
- Chondria atropurpurea Harvey
- Chondria baileyana (Montagne) Harvey
- Chondria bernardii P.[J.L.] Dangeard
- Chondria boryana (De Notaris ex J.Agardh) De Toni
- Chondria botryoides C.Agardh
- Chondria bulbosa Harvey
- Chondria bullata N'Yuert & Payri
- Chondria californica (Collins) Kylin
- Chondria capensis (Harvey) Askenasy
- Chondria capillaris (Hudson) M.J.Wynne
- Chondria capreolis Gordon-Mills & Womersley
- Chondria cartilaginea (J.Agardh) De Toni
- Chondria chejuensis Y.-P.Lee
- Chondria clarionensis Setchell & N.L.Gardner
- Chondria clavata (Sonder) Harvey
- Chondria clavata var. dendroides Harvey
- Chondria clavellosa var. lyngbyei C.Agardh
- Chondria clavellosa (Turner) C.Agardh
- Chondria cnicophylla (Melvill) De Toni
- Chondria coerulescens (J.Agardh) Falkenberg
- Chondria collinsiana M.A.Howe
- Chondria complanata Suhr
- Chondria compressa Papenfuss
- Chondria concrescens E.Y.Dawson
- Chondria confusa G.W.Lawson & D.M.John
- Chondria constricta M.Tani & Masuda
- Chondria corallorhiza (J.Agardh) Falkenberg
- Chondria cornuta Børgesen
- Chondria corynephora Harvey
- Chondria crassicaulis Harvey
- Chondria curdieana (Harvey ex J.Agardh) De Toni
- Chondria curvilineata F.S.Collins & Hervey
- Chondria dangeardii E.Y.Dawson
- Chondria dasyphylla var. pyrifera J Agardh
- Chondria dasyphylla var. intermedia (Grunow) P.C.Silva
- Chondria dasyphylla f. floridana F.S.Collins
- Chondria dasyphylla var. sedifolia Harvey
- Chondria dasyphylla var. stellata Børgesen
- Chondria dasyphylla (Woodward) C.Agardh
- Chondria debilis Harvey
- Chondria decidua Tani & Masuda
- Chondria decipiens Kylin
- Chondria decumbens Weber-van Bosse
- Chondria delilei C.Agardh
- Chondria densa P.[J.L.] Dangeard
- Chondria econstricta Tani & Masuda
- Chondria expansa Okamura
- Chondria filiformis C.Agardh
- Chondria flexicaulis Taylor
- Chondria floridana (F.S.Collins) M.A.Howe
- Chondria foliifera (J.Agardh ) Falkenberg
- Chondria forsteri (Mertens ex Turner) C.Agardh
- Chondria furcata C.Agardh
- Chondria fusifolia (Hooker & Harvey) Harvey
- Chondria glandulifera Kützing
- Chondria glomerata Kützing
- Chondria hamulosa (Esper) C.Agardh
- Chondria hapteroclada C.K.Tseng
- Chondria harveyana (J.Agardh) De Toni
- Chondria hieroglyphica Gordon-Mills & Womersley
- Chondria hypnoides Børgesen
- Chondria hypoglossoides F.Schmitz
- Chondria incrassata (J.Agardh) Gordon-Mills & Womersley
- Chondria incurva Gordon-Mills & Womersley
- Chondria infestans (A.H.S.Lucas) A.J.K.Millar
- Chondria intertexta P.C.Silva
- Chondria intricata Okamura
- Chondria iridescens Lucas
- Chondria lanceolata Harvey
- Chondria lancifolia Okamura
- Chondria laxa (R.Brown ex Turner) C.Agardh
- Chondria leptacremon (Melvill ex G.Murray) De Toni
- Chondria littoralis Harvey
- Chondria macrocarpa Harvey
- Chondria mageshimensis Tanaka & K.Nozawa
- Chondria mairei G.Feldmann
- Chondria minutula Weber-van Bosse
- Chondria minutula Noda
- Chondria muscoides C.Agardh
- Chondria muscoides var. turneri C.Agardh
- Chondria myriopoda Gordon-Mills & Millar
- Chondria nana C.Agardh
- Chondria nidifica Harvey
- Chondria nodae M.J.Wynne
- Chondria obtusa var. virgata C.Agardh
- Chondria obtusa var. gracilis Martens
- Chondria obtusa var. paniculata Martens
- Chondria obtusa var. paniculata C.Agardh
- Chondria obtusa var. patentiramea Montagne
- Chondria obtusa (Hudson) C.Agardh
- Chondria obtusa var. gracilis C.Agardh
- Chondria oppositiclada E.Y.Dawson
- Chondria opuntia J.Agardh
- Chondria opuntia (Goodenough & Woodward) C.Agardh
- Chondria opuntioides (Harvey) Harvey
- Chondria ovalifolia (J.Agardh) De Toni
- Chondria ovalis var. obovata C.Agardh
- Chondria papillosa C.Agardh
- Chondria parvula C.Agardh
- Chondria pellucida Y.-P.Lee
- Chondria pinnatifida (Hudson) C.Agardh
- Chondria pinnatifida var. elata C.Agardh
- Chondria platyclada P.[J.L.] Dangeard
- Chondria platyclada W.R.Taylor
- Chondria platyramea A.B.Joly & Ugadim
- Chondria polyrhiza F.S.Collins & Hervey
- Chondria pumila Vickers
- Chondria pungens Schousboe
- Chondria pusilla Delle Chiaje
- Chondria pusilla (Stackhouse) W.J.Hooker
- Chondria pygmaea Garbary & Vandermeulen
- Chondria rainfordii Lucas
- Chondria ramentacea C.Agardh
- Chondria ramosissima Lindenberg
- Chondria ramulosa Lindenberg
- Chondria repanda Schousboe
- Chondria repens Børgesen
- Chondria riparia (J.Agardh) De Toni
- Chondria rubra Harvey
- Chondria ryukyuensis Yamada
- Chondria sanguinea
- Chondria scintillans G.Feldmann
- Chondria secundata (J.Agardh) De Toni
- Chondria sedifolia Harvey
- Chondria seticulosa (Forsskål) C.Agardh
- Chondria sibogae Weber-van Bosse
- Chondria simpliciuscula Weber-van Bosse
- Chondria stolonifera Okamura
- Chondria striolata C.Agardh
- Chondria subfasciculata (J.Agardh) Gordon-Mills & Womersley
- Chondria subsecunda Gordon-Mills & Womersley
- Chondria succulenta (J.Agardh) Falkenberg
- Chondria suprabulbosa Gordon-Mills & Womersley
- Chondria tenuissima var. striolata (C.Agardh) Schiffner
- Chondria tenuissima var. baileyana (Montagne) Farlow
- Chondria tenuissima var. uncinata (Zanardini) De Toni
- Chondria tenuissima (Withering) C.Agardh- type
- Chondria tenuissima f. californica Collins
- Chondria tenuissima f. divergens Hauck
- Chondria tenuissima var. minuta C.Agardh
- Chondria transversalis Børgesen
- Chondria tumulosa A.R.Sherwood et J.M.Huisman
- Chondria umbellula Harvey
- Chondria usnea (R.Brown ex Turner) C.Agardh
- Chondria uvaria (J.A.Murray) C.Agardh
- Chondria vermicularis
- Chondria verticillata Harvey
- Chondria viticulosa A.J.K.Millar & M.J.Wynne
- Chondria wrightii (Turner) C.Agardh
- Chondria xishaensis J.-F.Xhang & B.-M.Xia
