= HMS Bustler (1782) =

Brig of the Royal Navy

History

Great Britain
- Name: Shillelagh
- Fate: Sold January 1782

Great Britain
- Name: HMS Bustler
- Acquired: January 1782 by purchase
- Fate: Sold 28 May 1788

General characteristics
- Tons burthen: 20876/94 (bm)
- Length: Overall:76 ft 7 1/2 in (23.4 m); Keel:60 ft 9 in (18.5 m)
- Beam: 25 ft 4 1/2 in (7.7 m)
- Depth of hold: 10 ft 0 in (3.0 m)
- Sail plan: Cutter, converted to Brig
- Complement: 90
- Armament: 16 × 4-pounder guns

History

Great Britain
- Name: Bustler
- Acquired: 1788 by purchase
- Captured: 1795

General characteristics
- Tons burthen: 199, or 208 (bm)
- Complement: 1793:60; 1794:20
- Armament: 1793: 20 × 6&12-pounder cannons; 1794: 18 × 6&12-pounder cannons

HMS Bustler was the mercantile Shillelagh, which the Admiralty purchased in January 1782. She was sold in 1788 and returned to mercantile service. In 1793 she became a privateer and made one notable capture. She then became a West Indiaman that the French captured in 1795.

== Royal Navy ==
The Admiralty purchased Shillelagh in January 1782 and she underwent fitting at Plymouth between February and June. In March Commander Samuel Cox commissioned her for the Channel. He paid her off in August. She underwent coppering and conversion to a brig between July and December. In November Commander Robert Burton commissioned Bustler for the Irish Sea. She then served out of Holyhead, on Anglesey, until she was paid off in May 1786. The Navy sold her at Deptford for £240 on 25 August 1788.

== Merchantman ==
It is obscure what name Bustler sailed under, who her owners were, or what her trade was between 1788 and 1793.

Still, Captain Henry Passmore acquired a letter of marque on 4 March 1793 for Bustler. Bustler captured Necker in September 1793, and sent her into Dartmouth. Neckar, Mitchell, master, prize to Bustler, arrived at Gravesend on 21 October 1793. Prize money for Neckar was paid on 8 March 1794.

Captain Stephen Thomas acquired a letter of marque on 8 March 1794. This letter Thomas stated that Bustler's crew was 20 men. The reduction indicated that she was no longer engaged in privateering as she would not have enough men for prize crews on captures.

Captain Thomas sailed for San Domingo on 11 April. Lloyd's List reported in July 1795 that a French privateer or privateers had captured Bustler, of London, as well as a number of other merchantmen, and taken them into Aux Cayes.
