= Chondria tumulosa =

Scientific classification
- Domain: Eukaryota
- Clade: Archaeplastida
- Division: Rhodophyta
- Class: Florideophyceae
- Order: Ceramiales
- Family: Rhodomelaceae
- Genus: Chondria
- Species: C. tumulosa

Binomial name
- Chondria tumulosa A.R.Sherwood et J.M.Huisman

Species of alga

Chondria tumulosa is a species of red algae in the family Rhodomelacae. It was first discovered in 2016, growing in small patches in the Pearl and Hermes Atoll in the Northwestern Hawaiian Islands. By 2019, the species had spread to cover several thousand square meters, smothering and killing vast swathes of the atoll's coral reefs. C. tumulosa is unlike any other species in its genus, having a tumbleweed-like growth form that allows fragments to break off and spread, allowing it to colonize new areas. The true origin of C. tumulosa in the region remains unknown; it displays many characteristics of an invasive species and is not closely related to any other Hawaiian Chondria, but it would have been relatively difficult to colonize such a remote area. It has also been suggested that it is a native species that suddenly spread due to changes in the ecosystem. Control and mitigation strategies will have to be made to prevent the species' spread.
