= Necker (1789 ship) =

History

France
- Name: Necker
- Namesake: Jacques Necker
- Launched: United States
- In service: 1789
- Captured: Late 1793

General characteristics
- Tons burthen: 300, or 399 (bm)
- Complement: 20 or 21 men

Necker was a whaler built and manned by Americans but operating out of Dunkirk and sailing with French papers and under the French flag. Her masters came primarily from Nantucket, drawn by a French government program to build a French whaling industry based there. She made three whaling voyages to Greenland, the coast of Brazil, and the Pacific. On the voyage to the Pacific she transited Cape Horn in company with the brigantine Hope, under the command of the sealer and explorer Joseph Ingraham. The Spanish authorities detained her on suspicion of smuggling, but then released her. A British privateer captured Necker in September 1793 after the outbreak of war with France while Necker was returning to Dunkirk from Brazil and her fourth voyage.

== Career ==
William Haydon commissioned Necker in April 1789, with 20 men.

1st whaling voyage (1789): Captain Richard Coffin sailed Necker to Greenland on 26 April 1789. She returned on 26 July.

2nd whaling voyage (1789–1790): Captain Richard Coffin sailed Necker to the coast of Brazil on 13 August 1789. On 7 September Neckar, Coffin, master, was at Santiago, Cape Verde. Later during the voyage, on 16 November 1789, a whale killed Coffin and two of his men; Amaziah Gardner replaced him as master. Necker returned to Dunkirk on 28 June 1790 with 583 barrels of whale oil and 6000 pounds of whale bone.

3rd whaling voyage (1790–1792): Captain John Hawes sailed Necker from Dunkirk on 10 October 1790, bound for the Pacific.

On 17 January 1791, Necker was off Cape Horn when she encountered Hope, under the command of Joseph Ingraham, who was seeking furs, but exploring as he went. The sea was calm so Hawes invited Ingraham to dine with him, apparently on an excellent dinner of roast pork, a pig having just been killed. The two captains decided to travel in company as they were going in the same direction, and sailing at the same rate. The two vessels stayed together for 18 days, but then on 4 February a gale came up that separated them. At the time they were north of the western entrance to the Straits of Magellan. (Note: Ingraham made a number of beautifully drawn charts as he travelled. One chart is of Hope's track around Cape Horn. The chart includes a small drawing of Hope and Necker with land behind them.)

Hawes explained to Ingraham that although Necker carried French papers and flew the French flag, she had been built in the United States. Her captain, officers, and most of her crew were Americans. The French government had policies in place to encourage Americans to settle in Dunkirk to build up the French whaling industry. The Americans had no intention of remaining in France once they had accumulated enough to be able to retire in comfort back in the United States. (Note: France had granted a monopoly to the Nantucket whalemen of Dunkirk.)

Neckar, Howes, master, was reported to have been well on 15 June 1790 around Cape Horn.

On 2 March 1791, the Spanish vessel Liebre (Hare) detained Necker about 100 miles off the coast. Liebre was on a patrol to Chiloé, Valdivia, and Juan Fernández, looking for smugglers. Liebre took Necker into Valparaiso. There Ambrosio O'Higgins, the Captain general (military governor) of Chile, released Necker. 0'Higgins warned Hawes to stay away from the coast.

Necker returned to Dunkirk on 26 March 1792 with 839 barrels of whale oil. By one report, at the time of her return to Dunkirk she was under the command of "Coffin".

4th whaling voyage (1792–1793): Captain George Whippey sailed Necker from Dunkirk on 3 September 1792, bound for the coast of Brazil.

== Capture ==
The British privateer Bustler, Hugh Passmore, master, captured Necker in September 1793 as Necker was returning to Dunkirk from the southern fishery, and sent her into Dartmouth. Neckar, Mitchell, master, prize to Bustler, arrived at Gravesend on 21 October 1793. Prize money was paid on 8 March 1794.
