= Hermes (1811 ship) =

1811 Quebecois whaler

History

United Kingdom
- Name: Hermes
- Builder: Montreal
- Launched: 1811
- Fate: Wrecked 1822

General characteristics
- Tons burthen: 258 (bm)
- Propulsion: Sails
- Armament: 18 × 12&9-pounder guns

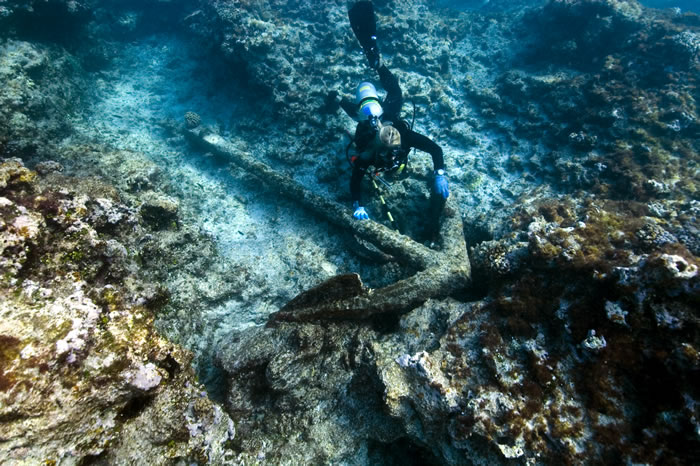
An anchor of the Hermes at its shipwreck site in the Pearl and Hermes atoll

Hermes was built in Quebec in 1811. She traded widely before she made two voyages as a whaler to the British Southern Whale Fishery. She was wrecked in 1822 during the second voyage.

The wreck was found at Pearl and Hermes atoll in the 21st century, an atoll for which the ship is also a namesake along with another ship.

== Career ==
A letter dated 16 May 1812 reported that Hermes had been re-registered at London. She entered Lloyd's Register (LR) in 1813 with Harvey, master, Haslop, owner, and trade London–Smyrna.

LR for 1816 showed Hermes with W.Moore, master, changing to J.Streffen, Haslop, owner, changing to Douglas & Co., and trade London–West Indies.

On 30 November 1818 Hermes, Bond, master, put into Lerwick, leaky. She had been sailing from Archangel to London. She had had to throw part of her cargo overboard.

LR for 1819 showed Hermes with Bond, master, changing to Taylor, owner Douglas, changing to Gales, and trade London–Havana, changing to London–South Seas.

1st whaling voyage (1819–1820): Captain J. Taylor sailed from London 6 April 1819. Hermes returned on 5 September 1820.

== Fate ==
In 1820 Captain Taylor sailed from London bound for the Sandwich Islands, for Hermes's 2nd whaling voyage.

Hermes was lost on 26 April 1822 in the South Seas. Her crew were rescued. She was wrecked on a coral reef in the NW of the Hawaiian Islands. Hermes was in company with the whaler Pearl, which also was wrecked at the same time. Pearl was wrecked first; Hermes wrecked when she came to Pearl's assistance. The 57 men from both crews were able to land on one of the atoll's small islands. They were able to salvage provisions that enabled them to survive for some months. They also salvaged timbers that they used to build a 30-ton (bm) schooner that they named Deliverance. Fortuitously Thames sailed by and rescued most of the survivors before Deliverance had been completed. (Note: This was probably the whaler Thames, or Earl Morley.) Still, James Robinson, carpenter on Hermes who had led the construction, and eleven other survivors chose to sail Deliverance to Honolulu. There Robinson and another of the crewmen formed the James Robinson & Co boat repair company.

LL reported on 18 April 1823 that both Hermes and Pearl had been wrecked and that their crews had been saved.

Pearl and Hermes gave their name to the Pearl and Hermes Atoll.

As late as 1870s the keel stem and stern could be seen on the bottom.

Postscript: The wreck of what may have been Hermes or Pearl was discovered 20 September 2004 at the atoll.
