= Whaler =

Specialized ship designed for whaling

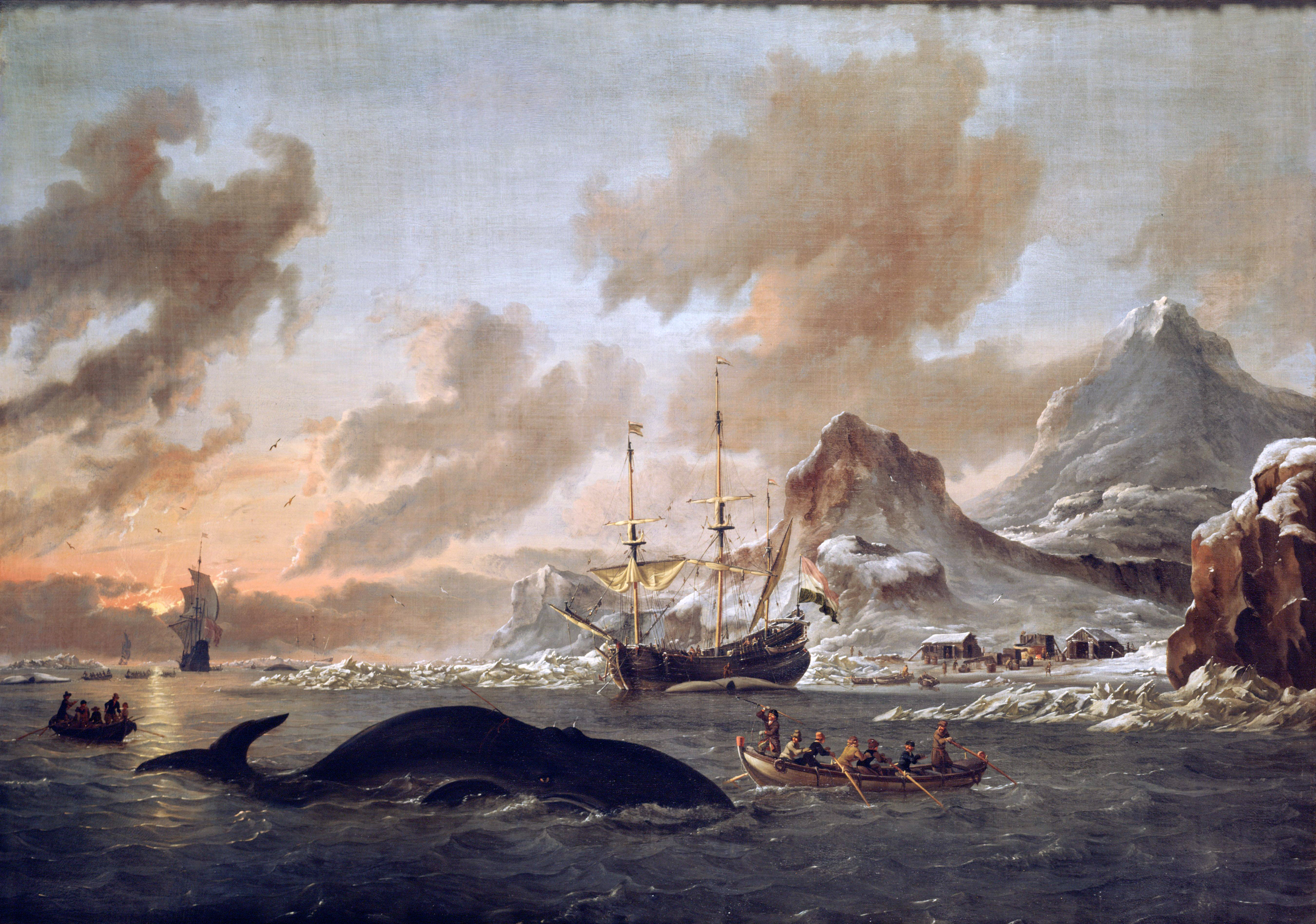
Dutch whalers near Spitsbergen, painted by Abraham Storck.

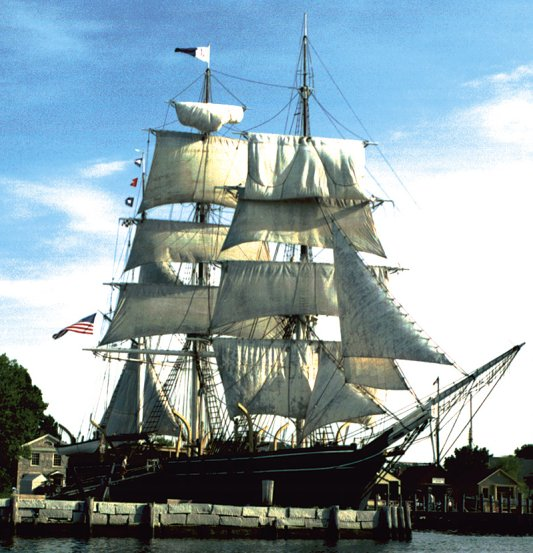
Charles W. Morgan was a whaleship built in 1841

A whaler or whaling ship is a specialized vessel, designed or adapted for whaling: the catching or processing of whales.

== Terminology ==
The term whaler is mostly historic. A handful of nations continue with industrial whaling, and one, Japan, still dedicates a single factory ship for the industry. The vessels used by aboriginal whaling communities are much smaller and are used for various purposes over the course of the year.

The whale catcher was developed during the Steam-powered vesselage and then driven by diesel engines throughout much of the twentieth century. It was designed with a harpoon gun mounted at its bow and was fast enough to chase and catch rorquals such as the fin whale. At first, whale catchers either brought the whales they killed to a whaling station, a settlement ashore where the carcasses could be processed, or to its factory ship anchored in a sheltered bay or inlet. With the later development of the slipway at the ship's stern, whale catchers were able to transfer their catch to factory ships operating in the open sea.

Previous to that was the whaleship of the 16th to early 20th centuries, driven first by sail and then by steam. The most famous example is the fictional Pequod in Moby-Dick, a novel based on the whaling industry in Nantucket and New Bedford. Whaleships carried multiple whaleboats, open rowing boats used to chase and harpoon the whale. The whaleship would keep watch from the crowsnest, so it could sail to the signal and lash the dead whale alongside. Then the work of flensing (butchering) began, to separate the whale into its valuable components. The blubber was rendered into whale oil using two or three try-pots set in a brick furnace called the tryworks. Spermaceti was especially valuable, and as sperm whaling voyages were several years long, the whaling ships were equipped for all eventualities.

There have also been vessels which combined chasing and processing, such as the bottlenose whalers of the late 19th and early 20th century, and catcher/factory ships of the modern era.

== In wartime ==
The crews of whaling vessels fought small skirmishes for the control of the Spitsbergen whale fishery between 1613 and 1638. The Dutch were the first Europeans to visit Svalbard, and this gave a head start to whaling in the Dutch Republic.

In the late 18th and early 19th century, the owners of whalers frequently armed their vessels with cannons to enable the vessels to protect themselves against pirates, and in wartime, privateers. Weapons were also carried on vessels visiting Pacific islands for food, water, and wood in order to defend themselves from the sometimes hostile inhabitants. At the outbreak of the French Revolutionary Wars in 1793, British privateers captured several French whalers, among them Necker and Deux Amis, and Anne. Dutch privateers captured Port de Paix and Penn. At the time, many French whalers transferred to the American flag, the United States being neutral in the Anglo-French war.

Some whaleships also carried letters of marque that authorized them to take enemy vessels should the opportunity arise. In July 1793 the British armed whaleship Liverpool, of 20 guns, captured the French whaleship Chardon. However, the French crew succeeded in retaking their vessel. Also that year, an armed British whaleship captured the French whaleship Hébé in Walvis Bay.

During the War of 1812, the U.S. Navy captured two British whalers, Atlantic and Seringapatam, in 1813, though both were recaptured in 1814.

During World War II, the Norwegian and British navies requisitioned a number of whalers for use in a variety of functions such as minesweeping, search and rescue, and anti-submarine warfare. Ten Allied vessels categorized as whalers were lost in the war.

== Modern era ==
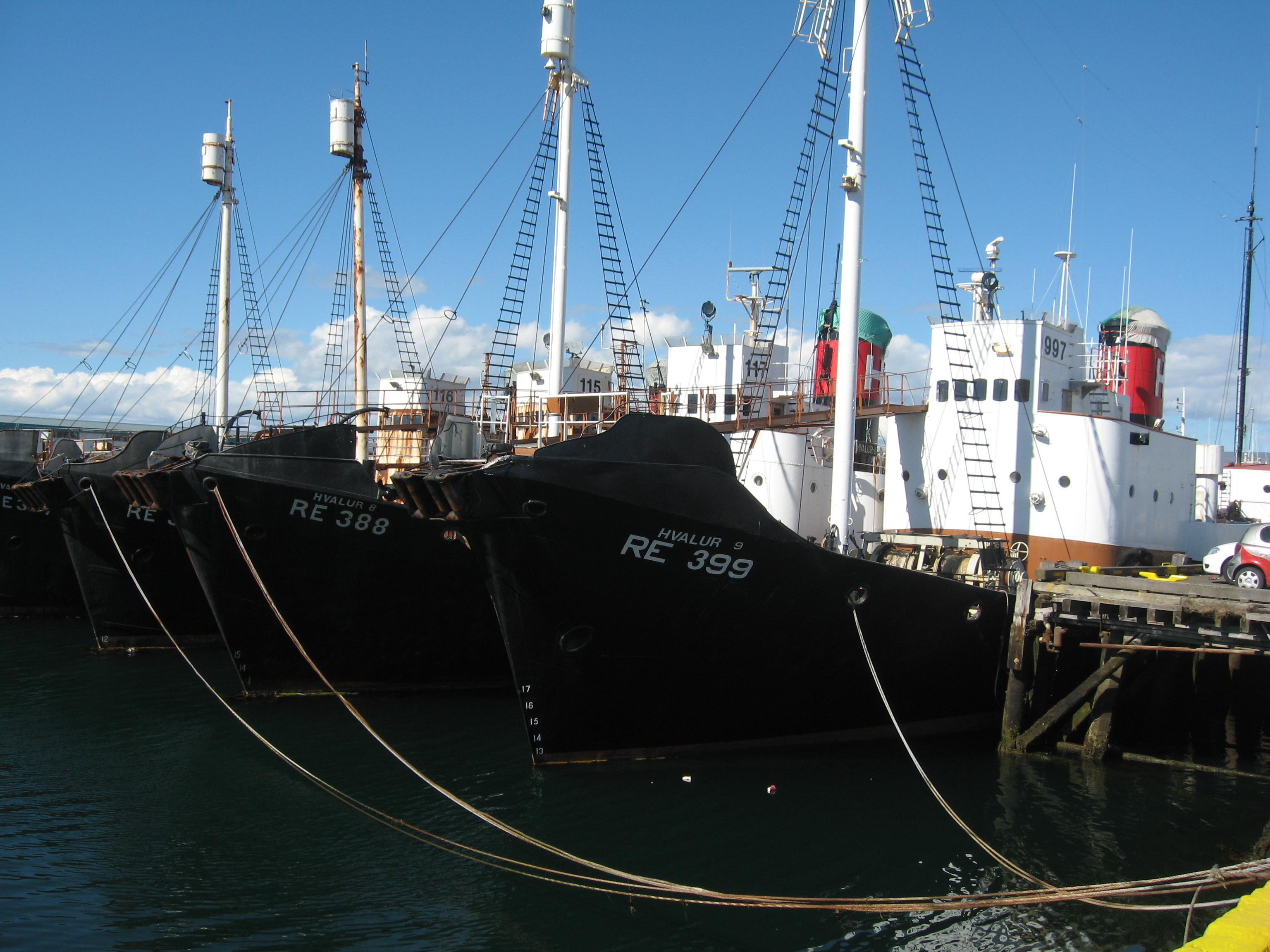
Harpoon ships of the Icelandic whaling fleet in port.

Since the 1982 moratorium on commercial whaling, few countries still operate whalers, with Norway, Iceland, and Japan among those still operating them. Of those, the Nisshin Maru of Japan's Institute of Cetacean Research (ICR) is the only whaling factory ship in operation.

As compared to whaling before and during the 19th century, which was executed with handheld harpoons thrown from oar-powered whaleboats (depicted most famously in Herman Melville's Moby Dick), whaling since the 1900s has been quite different. Whale oil, which fossil-fuel based alternatives has supplanted, is no longer the primary commercial product of whaling. Whaling is now done for whale meat for the relatively small culinary market. (Norwegian whalers account for about 20% of whales caught and Japanese whalers for about 60%.) Harpoon cannons, fired from harpoon ships with displacement in the hundreds of tons, are now universally used for commercial whaling operations. These motorized ships are able to keep up with the sleeker and fast-swimming rorquals such as the fin whale, that would have been impossible for the muscle-powered rowboats to chase, and allow whaling to be done more safely for the crews.

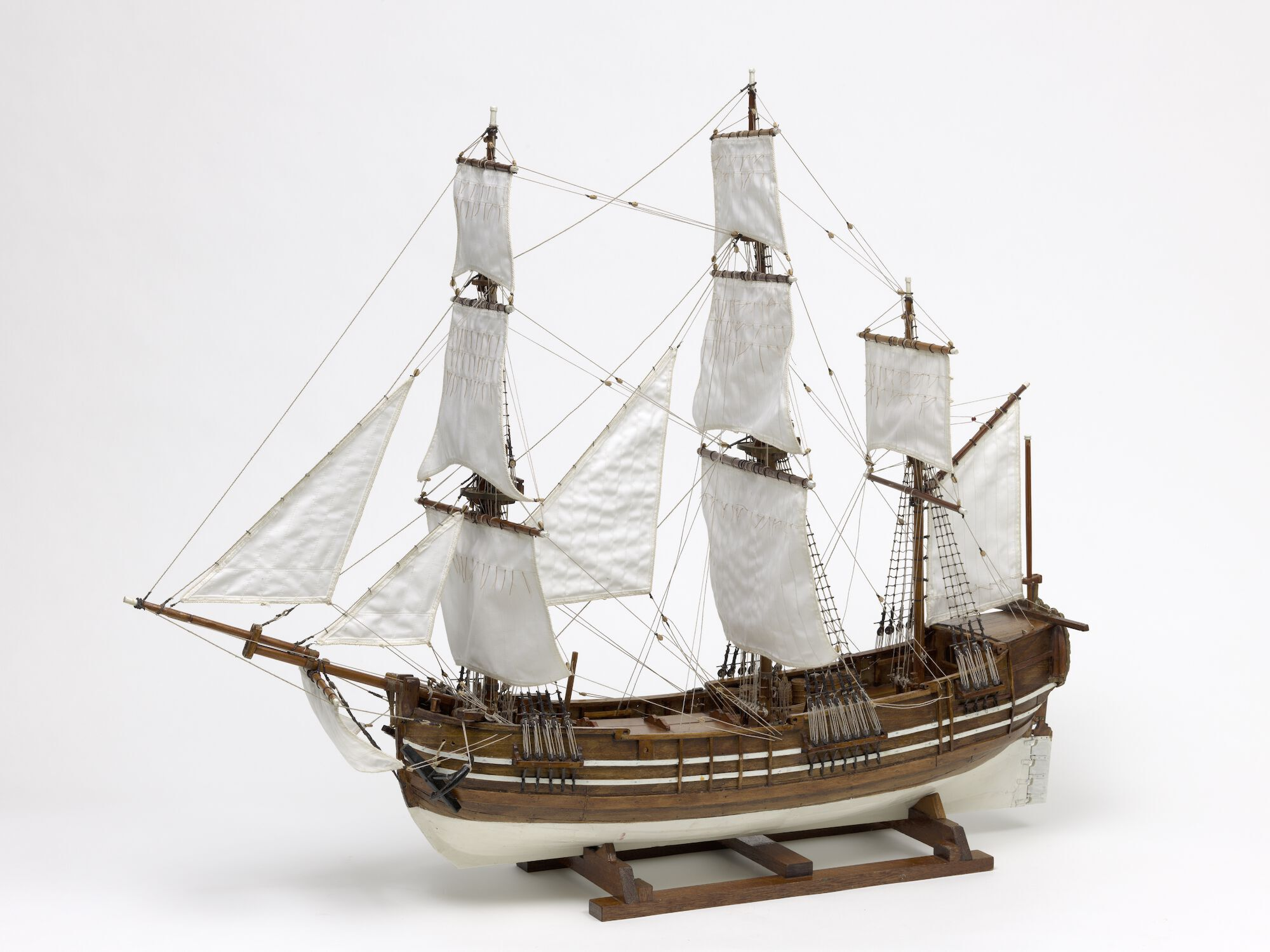
Ship model of a whaler, NAVIGO National Fisheries Museum, Belgium

The use of grenade-tipped harpoons has greatly improved the effectiveness of whaling, allowing whales to be killed often instantaneously as compared to the previous method in which whales bled to death, which took a long time and left the whale to thrash around in its death throes. These harpoons inject air into the carcass to keep the heavier rorqual whales hunted today from sinking. The harpoon-cannon is still criticized for its cruelty as not all whales are killed instantly; death can take from minutes to an hour.

Japan is currently the only country that engages in whaling in the Antarctic, which is now under the protection of the International Whaling Commission as the Southern Ocean Whale Sanctuary. The area formerly saw large scale commercial whaling operations by numerous countries before the moratorium. The three Japanese harpoon ships of the ICR serve a factory ship that processes the catch on board and preserves it on site in refrigerators, allowing the long endurance whaling missions. These whaling operations, which are claimed by Japan to be for research purposes, sell the meat from these operations on the market, allowed under the current moratorium to defer research costs. They are highly controversial, and are challenged by anti-whaling parties as being merely a disguise for commercial whaling. The Sea Shepherd Conservation Society has clashed with the Japanese whalers in the Antarctic in confrontations that have led to international media attention and diplomatic incidents.

== Specific ships ==
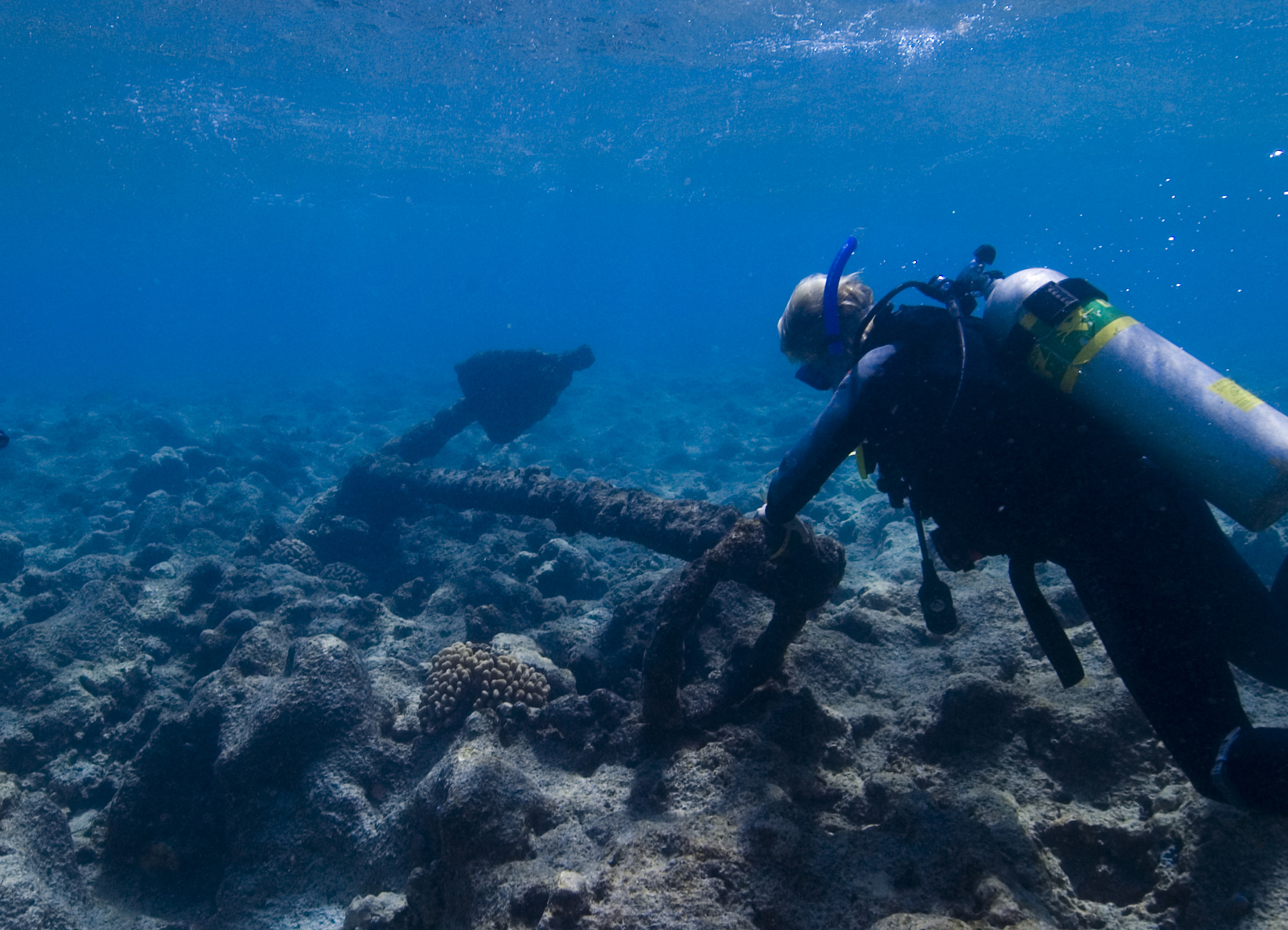
Anchor from whaling ship wreck site

- Hvalur 9
- Jason
- Southern Actor
- Charles W. Morgan
- Essex (sunk by whale, inspiring the novel Moby-Dick)
- Two Brothers wrecked on Pacific atoll in 1823, wreck found in 2008.
- Hermes, wrecked in 1822
- Industry, which was built in 1815 and capsized in the Gulf of Mexico on May 26, 1836.
- Pequod (fictional; appears in Herman Melville's novel Moby-Dick)

== Bibliography ==
- Demerliac, Alain (1996). La Marine De Louis XVI: Nomenclature Des Navires Français De 1774 À 1792 [Louis XVI's Navy: Nomenclature of French ships from 1774 to 1792] (in French). Nice: Éditions OMEGA. ISBN 2-906381-23-3.
